= Tom Kruse =

Tom Kruse may refer to:

- Tom Kruse (mailman) (1914–2011), Australian mailman, featured in documentary The Back of Beyond
- Tom Kruse (inventor) (fl. 1992), inventor of the Hoveround, a type of electric wheelchair

== See also ==
- Tom Cruise (born 1962), American actor
- Thomas Cruise (born 1991), English footballer
- Tom Cruse (born 1989), English rugby union player
- Thomas Cruse (1857–1943), U.S. general
- Com Truise (born 1985), American musician
