= South Park season 7 =

Season of television series

South Park
- Season 7
- Home media release cover
- No. of episodes: 15

Release
- Original network: Comedy Central
- Original release: March 19 – December 17, 2003

Season chronology
- ← Previous; Season 6 Next → Season 8

The seventh season of South Park, an American animated television series created by Trey Parker and Matt Stone, began airing on March 19, 2003. The seventh season concluded after 15 episodes on December 17, 2003, and was written and directed by Trey Parker. It is the first full season of South Park since the fifth season to feature main character Kenny McCormick, who was mostly absent in the sixth season. The seventh season is also the last season to feature Eliza Schneider as the majority voice of the female characters.

== Episodes ==
| No. overall | No. in season | Title | Directed by | Written by | Original release date | Prod. code | Viewers (millions) |
|---|---|---|---|---|---|---|---|
| 97 | 1 | "Cancelled" | Trey Parker | Trey Parker | March 19, 2003 | 704 | 2.34 |
Lifting plot and scenes off of the pilot episode "Cartman Gets an Anal Probe", the boys soon learn that Earth is actually a reality show for aliens, and they attempt to save it from cancellation.
| 98 | 2 | "Krazy Kripples" | Trey Parker | Trey Parker | March 26, 2003 | 702 | 2.50 |
Timmy and Jimmy start a club for cripples, which draws attention from the Crips who agree to let the two join if they kill the Crips' rivals, The Bloods. Meanwhile, Christopher Reeve comes to town to promote stem cell research for the handicapped. Main characters Stan, Kyle, Cartman, and Kenny do not have much role in the episode's plot, but have a few cameos throughout, not wanting to get involved in anything going on.
| 99 | 3 | "Toilet Paper" | Trey Parker | Trey Parker | April 2, 2003 | 703 | 2.82 |
Seeking revenge after being put in detention, the boys decides to TP their art teacher's house. However, Kyle feels guilty about this. Meanwhile, Officer Barbrady seeks help from a juvenile toilet-paperer named Josh to crack the case.
| 100 | 4 | "I'm a Little Bit Country" | Trey Parker | Trey Parker | April 9, 2003 | 701 | 3.04 |
In the 100th episode of the series, the boys are caught in the middle of a brutal town fight between supporters of the War in Iraq and the people against it. Meanwhile, Cartman travels back in time to the late Colonial era by electrocuting himself in water. Guest Star: Norman Lear as Benjamin Franklin
| 101 | 5 | "Fat Butt and Pancake Head" | Trey Parker | Trey Parker | April 16, 2003 | 705 | 2.60 |
Cartman's hand-puppet "Jennifer Lopez" garners major publicity during a presentation about Latino culture, which enrages the real Jennifer Lopez.
| 102 | 6 | "Lil' Crime Stoppers" | Trey Parker | Trey Parker | April 23, 2003 | 706 | 2.40 |
When the boys rescue a little girl’s doll, they are hired by Sergeant Yates to bust a violent drug deal.
| 103 | 7 | "Red Man's Greed" | Trey Parker | Trey Parker | April 30, 2003 | 707 | 2.56 |
The town is taken over by Native Americans who want to create a super-highway to their new casino.
| 104 | 8 | "South Park Is Gay" | Trey Parker | Trey Parker | October 22, 2003 | 708 | 3.10 |
The men and boys of town become metrosexual in response to a fad show, becoming attracte. Kyle, Mr. Slave, and Mr. Garrison try to stop the wave of metrosexuality; Kyle is treated like an outcast, while Mr. Garrison believes the fad undermines real homosexuals.
| 105 | 9 | "Christian Rock Hard" | Trey Parker | Trey Parker | October 29, 2003 | 709 | 2.42 |
Cartman, Token, and Butters form a Christian rock band called "Faith +1" so that Cartman can win a bet against Kyle for $10. Stan, Kyle, and Kenny (who have their own rock band named "Moop") independently protest against illegal music downloads after getting arrested for doing such.
| 106 | 10 | "Grey Dawn" | Trey Parker | Trey Parker | November 5, 2003 | 710 | 2.24 |
The elderly have their driver's licenses taken away, and the AARP retaliates.
| 107 | 11 | "Casa Bonita" | Trey Parker | Trey Parker | November 12, 2003 | 711 | 2.65 |
Kyle does not invite Cartman to Casa Bonita for his birthday, so Cartman tries to get rid of Butters (who was going to the party rather than him) and changes his attitude to fill in his place.
| 108 | 12 | "All About Mormons" | Trey Parker | Trey Parker | November 19, 2003 | 712 | 2.35 |
Stan befriends a boy and his Mormon family, angering the other boys.
| 109 | 13 | "Butt Out" | Trey Parker | Trey Parker | December 3, 2003 | 713 | 2.68 |
The town calls in Rob Reiner to combat the spread of cigarettes among children after the boys are caught smoking.
| 110 | 14 | "Raisins" | Trey Parker | Trey Parker | December 10, 2003 | 714 | 2.91 |
Stan becomes a Goth after Wendy breaks up with him. Meanwhile, Butters falls for Lexus, a waitress at a Hooters-esque restaurant for kids called "Raisins".
| 111 | 15 | "It's Christmas in Canada" | Trey Parker | Trey Parker | December 17, 2003 | 715 | 2.39 |
Kyle and the boys fly to Canada during Christmas time to see the Canadian Prime Minister after Ike's biological parents take him away.

== See also ==
- South Park (Park County, Colorado)
- South Park City
