= All About Mormons =

- South Park episode
- Prior to "All About Mormons", the official LDS magazine portrayed the translation process as involving the golden plates (top, 1997). In 2003, South Park depicted the process using a hat (center). By 2017, the same Church publication depicted the translation process, now showing Smith using a hat.
- Episode no.: Season 7 Episode 12
- Directed by: Trey Parker
- Written by: Trey Parker
- Production code: 712
- Original air date: November 19, 2003

Episode chronology
← Previous "Casa Bonita"	Next → "Butt Out"
- South Park season 7

"All About Mormons", also known as "All About the Mormons?", is the twelfth episode of the seventh season of the American animated television series South Park and the 108th overall episode of the series. It was originally broadcast on Comedy Central in the United States on November 19, 2003. The episode revolves around the religion and culture of Mormons, as a Mormon family moves to the town of South Park and influences the beliefs of the family of character Stan Marsh. The story of Joseph Smith's founding of Mormonism and the origin of the Book of Mormon is told through a number of comedic 19th-century flashbacks, with a musical narration.

The episode was written and directed by series co-creator Trey Parker, and it was rated TV-MA in the United States. The episode evolved from personal experiences of creators Parker and Matt Stone, who grew up in Colorado. Growing up in Colorado both Stone and Parker often visited Utah, and both had Mormon classmates. The scene in which Stan is invited to dinner by the Mormon family was inspired by Parker's first girlfriend in high school, who was Mormon and invited him over for Family Home Evening. They found the religion ridiculous but hard to parody due to the good-natured attitudes of many Mormons.

The episode received positive reviews from television critics, and it has been placed on "best-of" South Park lists. Parker found that younger audiences found the episode unfunny, but many of his Mormon friends found it hilarious. "All About Mormons" was released on DVD along with the rest of the seventh season on March 21, 2006. Parker and Stone later carried over many themes from the episode for their musical The Book of Mormon, which opened on Broadway in 2011.

== Plot ==
A new family, the Harrisons, move into South Park, and their son Gary is stereotypically depicted as unusually perfect: having achieved high grades, been recognized as a state champion in sports, and starred in a national commercial for toothpaste. This invokes the wrath of the other boys, who swiftly draft Stan into the job of beating him up, though Gary's sheer politeness leads Stan to discover himself walking away with an invitation to dinner that night. Stan meets Gary's family who all share Gary's stereotypically perfect qualities. After dinner, they have a "Family Home Evening" wherein they play games, do performance art and read from the Book of Mormon. Stan is intrigued and confused by all this, leading him to question his parents about the Mormon family's beliefs. His father concludes that the Harrisons must be religious fanatics attempting to brainwash Stan, leading him to set out to physically assault Mr Harrison. Instead, Randy finds himself dumbfounded by the family's perfection, leading him to attempt to convert his own family to Mormonism. The next day, Cartman insinuates that Stan is romantically interested in Gary due the kind gestures the latter shows him.

Throughout the episode, characters frequently question the Latter Day Saints movement, as the story cuts to a retelling of the story of Joseph Smith founding of the religion. For satirical purposes, the show deviates from the original accounts of Mormonism's founding by adding extra details to stories originally left vague (e.g. the precise location where Martin Harris lost the only transcript of the Book of Lehi given to him by Joseph Smith). During the narration, an upbeat tune plays in the background, with a choral "Dum, dum, dum, dum, dum" following the lyrical lines of the song. When skeptic Lucy Harris appears in the sub-story, the chorus changes to "Smart, smart, smart, smart, smart", and it becomes clear that the voices are actually singing "Dumb, dumb, dumb, dumb, dumb" after the specifics of Smith's story. The show asserts flaws in the religion's founding (for example, that Joseph Smith offered no proof to the general public of finding the golden plates), with the smoking gun finally arriving when the Harrisons claim Smith was incapable of producing a perfect replication of his original translations due to God becoming enraged when Martin Harris misplaced them, causing Stan to deride the Latter Day Saints beliefs. Furthermore, Stan claims this to be a tactic of blindsiding unintelligent people, causing them to convert, pointing out his father's prior conversion as an example of the phenomenon.

Stan's anger does not upset anyone in the Mormon family, though it causes Gary to confront Stan and the other boys the following day. Gary reasons that, though his family's religious beliefs are indeed absurd, it has provided them with guidance and fostered charity, and condemns the other boys for their bigotry. He concludes that Stan has "a lot of growing up to do" and that he is no longer interested in pursuing a friendship, surmising the group should "suck my balls", leaving the boys in utter shock. The episode ends as Cartman acquires a newfound respect for Gary, announcing that he finds him cool.

== Production ==
The episode was written and directed by South Park co-creator Trey Parker. The character of the new Mormon student Gary is voiced by South Park writer Kyle McCulloch, who himself grew up Mormon.

Growing up in Colorado, Parker and Stone (while not Mormon themselves) knew a lot of Mormon people, and Parker's high school ex-girlfriend was a Mormon, whose family he had visited while they held Family Home Evening. Through these experiences, Parker learned a number of things about the religion, and he did more research for his film Orgazmo, in which he played the Mormon main character.

== Reception ==
Cameron Adams of the Herald Sun, a tabloid Australian newspaper, highlighted the episode among "Top Choice" picks in television. Chris Quinn of the San Antonio Express-News placed the episode at number 7 on his list of "Top 10 Most Offensive South Park Episodes and Therefore, Maybe The Best, List". In 2013, fans voted the episode as the best of the 7th season. The episode was used as an exhibit in discussing Mormonism in popular culture by Utah Valley State College religious studies professor Kelli Potter in a presentation titled "The Americanization of Mormonism Reflected in Pop Culture". KUER's Radio West host Doug Fabrizio used the episode as a case study in a discussion about "Mormonism and Popular Culture".

== See also ==
- Criticism of the Church of Jesus Christ of Latter-day Saints
- Folk magic and the Latter Day Saint movement
- Trapped in the Closet (South Park), 2005 episode that similarly satirizes Scientology
- The Book of Mormon, 2011 musical also created by Parker and Stone
