= Grey Dawn (South Park) =

- South Park episode
- Episode no.: Season 7 Episode 10
- Directed by: Trey Parker
- Written by: Trey Parker
- Production code: 710
- Original air date: November 5, 2003

Episode chronology
← Previous "Christian Rock Hard"	Next → "Casa Bonita"
- South Park season 7

"Grey Dawn" is the tenth episode in the seventh season and the 106th overall episode of the animated television series South Park. It originally aired on Comedy Central in the United States on November 5, 2003. This episode tackles the issue of elderly drivers, and mocks the AARP for their staunch opposition to re-testing elderly drivers, claiming the proposal as age discrimination.

In the episode, the senior citizens of South Park are killing people with their dangerous driving, and the residents feel that they are no longer safe on the streets. With their well-being at stake, the boys decide to take action against the older generation. Unwilling to surrender their driver's licenses, the elderly fight back, and the AARP soon gets involved.

The episode, and its name, parody the 1984 film Red Dawn.

== Plot ==
At the South Park Farmers' Market, Father Maxi holds a memorial service for nine people who died the previous day when they were run over by an elderly driver. The proceedings are then interrupted when another elderly driver plows straight into the market and kills several more people. The news covers the recent rash of senior-related driving tragedies, mentioning that the DMV was planning to suspend driver's licenses from senior citizens over 70 years of age. Grandpa Marsh and the other seniors have a meeting at the community center to decide what to do, struggling to remember what they were there for in the first place. When the meeting is over, all the seniors are driving on the road at the same time. Randy learns about this and warns the town, spreading panic. He manages to save the boys, who were playing street hockey, and they flee from the many cars recklessly wandering the streets. They hide in an old abandoned house, despite some of the cars managing to get in.

Because of the recent incidents, the state of Colorado demands that all seniors turn in their driver's licenses at the DMV which will be cut in two and dropped in the trash, much to the seniors' anger. An elderly man who anxiously worries how he will be able to get groceries and medicine is bluntly advised that he should be in a nursing home. Grandpa Marsh drives anyway to pick up his new Hoveround and makes the boys accompany him, with the boys theorizing they will be safer if they are in the car. After Marsh manages to drive recklessly, causing other cars to swerve off the road and crash, Officer Barbrady pulls the car over and takes Grandpa Marsh to jail for driving without a license. There, Grandpa Marsh reveals that he called the AARP for aid. During a class session later on, Mr. Garrison notices a large number of old people dropping out of the sky. The AARP has airdropped reinforcements and they begin taking hostages, liberating their colleagues from the retirement home and beginning to take over the town.

The military arrives and the seniors list their demands: their driver's licenses, more money for Medicare and keeping kids from skateboarding on the sidewalk. The AARP leader realizes they could even take over the whole country, and demonstrates that they are willing to kill hostages and soldiers to get their demands, but Marvin feels this goes too far beyond their original demands. The children find their parents under lockup. Randy tells the boys that the seniors were able to organize so effectively because they get up earlier than everyone else, representing an advantage over their offspring who prefer to sleep late. Randy then realizes that the children get up almost as early as the seniors, and are the only hope for getting the town back. Randy tells the boys to hide in the woods and find a way to fight, shouting through the fence, "Avenge me!"

After fleeing, the boys resolve to board up the town's Country Kitchen Buffet restaurant in order to cut the seniors off from their collective food supply. The AARP's plans are thwarted when they start collapsing from hunger outside of the locked Country Kitchen Buffet. The military takes the town back and arrests the AARP. Marvin is turned back over to his family, but when Randy admonishes him for his actions, Stan rebukes Randy, telling him that the condescending manner in which he treated Grandpa like a child is one of the main causes that led to the crisis in the first place. Stan also tells his grandfather that he should be proud to be a senior, but he should realize that he is a killing machine when he is driving, an assessment that Grandpa accepts. As the reconciled family goes home, Stan mutters "Dude, I hate my family".

== Cultural references ==
During the opening scene, Cartman responds to Kyle "Yeah, but like eight of them were hippies; mostly hippies go to Farmers' markets. Mostly." This is a reference to Carrie Henn's character "Newt" and her line in Aliens (1986): "We'd better get back, 'cause it'll be dark soon and they mostly come at night. Mostly."

The episode, according to the creators Matt Stone and Trey Parker, was partially inspired by the case of George Russell Weller, an elderly man who, in 2003, accidentally killed 10 people at a Santa Monica farmers market by driving through the crowd. They stated that, while it was a terrible incident, they didn't agree with elderly drivers losing their licenses and suggested they go through retesting.

Older drivers in the episode are depicted similar to zombies from the film Dawn of the Dead.

The restaurant that all the old people go to was originally going to be a Furr's Cafeteria, but the creators liked how Country Kitchen Buffet sounded.

When Randy and the boys first run away from several approaching senior's driven cars, a theme similar to Christine can be heard in the background, which is a direct reference to multiple scenes from the movie. A few moments later, when they are running up the stairs of an abandoned mansion whilst trying to hide from the elderly drivers, a man's corpse swings from a doorway, a reference to the slasher flick Halloween.

Old people are "mad as hell" and "not going to take this anymore" but they forget what they are mad about, a reference to the 1976 movie Network.

The scene where an elderly couple kills a fisherman with a "Jaws"-like theme playing in the background is a parody of Jaws.

The elderly man says "You can take our licences, but you'll never take our pride!" instead of "They may take our lives, but they'll never take our freedom!", a reference to the 1995 movie Braveheart.

== Home release ==
"Grey Dawn", along with the fourteen other episodes from The Complete Seventh Season, were released on a three-disc DVD set in the United States on March 21, 2006. The sets included brief audio commentaries by Parker and Stone for each episode. IGN gave the season an 8/10.
