= Christian Rock Hard =

- South Park episode
- Episode no.: Season 7 Episode 9
- Directed by: Trey Parker
- Written by: Trey Parker
- Production code: 709
- Original air date: October 29, 2003

Episode chronology
← Previous "South Park Is Gay!"	Next → "Grey Dawn"
- South Park season 7

"Christian Rock Hard" is the ninth episode of the seventh season and the 105th overall episode of the American animated series South Park. It originally aired on Comedy Central in the United States on October 29, 2003.

In the episode, the boys start a rock band, but concerned with the fact that people will potentially download their music from the Internet illegally, they refuse to play. Meanwhile, Eric Cartman starts his own Christian rock band, called Faith + 1.

The episode satirizes famous artists who have spoken out against copyright infringement, such as Metallica, and also serves as a commentary on how most musicians do what they do mainly for profit gains. Christian rock music is also parodied as being identical to love songs, except for referencing Jesus in their lyrics.

== Plot ==
Stan Marsh, Kyle Broflovski, Kenny McCormick, and Eric Cartman form a band called Moop, but disagree on what direction they should take, as they all like different types of music. Cartman suggests that the band should play Christian rock; he bases his reasoning on the easy success that the genre has, referring to the success of the Christian rock band Creed as his pitch. However, Kyle disputes this. The disagreement becomes so heated that Cartman leaves, but not before betting $10 he will have a platinum-selling Christian rock album before Kyle's band does.

Seeking inspiration, Stan, Kyle, and Kenny download music from the Internet for free. However, they are immediately arrested by the FBI and are told of the serious consequences of illegal downloading, namely forcing musicians like Lars Ulrich (drummer of metal band Metallica), Britney Spears, and Master P to lose so much income from music piracy that they must either downgrade their extremely lavish purchases to very slightly less lavish ones or save up until they can afford all of what they want. As a result, Moop decides to go on strike until fans stop downloading illegally and are joined by a large number of musicians, including Britney Spears, Ozzy Osbourne, Missy Elliott, Master P, Blink-182, Metallica, Alanis Morissette, Meat Loaf, Rancid, and even Skyler's band, the Lords of the Underworld.

Meanwhile, Cartman enlists Butters Stotch and Token Black to form a Christian music band called Faith + 1. Cartman builds the band's repertoire by simply taking generic love songs and changing references like "baby" to "Jesus". While effective, the band eventually comes under some scrutiny when one of the songs includes sexual lyrics involving Christ. Cartman manages to manipulate his way out, and the band builds a considerable following.

Before long, Faith + 1 celebrates the sale of its millionth album. By this time, Stan, Kyle, and Kenny decide that the satisfaction of having fans should be more critical to musicians than fighting against the fans who make them famous and go to see their concerts. They decide that touring still brings in revenue and call off their strike. However, the other musicians do not follow suit, because, according to Britney Spears, they are "just about the money."

Cartman has spent all the money made from their album on a lavish, extravagant awards ceremony to celebrate Faith + 1's success and specifically to insult Kyle for losing the bet. However, Cartman's jubilation is short-lived when he is told that Christian record companies only hand out gold, frankincense, and myrrh records, so Faith + 1, as Christian artists, will never have a platinum album (which is not true in real life). Thus, Kyle technically did not lose the bet. Cartman, enraged at this turn of events, destroys the band's myrrh album award, screaming "God damn it!" and "Fuck Jesus!" This blasphemy causes the horrified fans to scream and flee.

When Token angrily chastises Cartman for driving away their fans, Cartman insults him by calling him a "black asshole" (for a third time throughout the episode). In response, Token assaults Cartman on the stage before walking away. Believing that Cartman got what he deserved, Stan, Kyle, and Kenny also leave. As Cartman lies moaning in pain on the stage, Butters approaches him meekly and farts in Cartman's face, gives him the finger, and says, "Fuck you, Eric", before walking away himself, leaving Cartman all alone to recover from his pain and humiliation.

== Home media ==
"Christian Rock Hard", along with the 14 other episodes from The Complete Seventh Season, was released on a three-disc DVD-set in the United States on March 21, 2006. The sets included brief audio commentaries by Parker and Stone for each episode. IGN gave the season an 8/10.

The episode is also included in the 2005 DVD South Park: The Passion of the Jew, alongside the titular episode and "Red Hot Catholic Love".
