= Lil' Crime Stoppers =

- South Park episode
- Episode no.: Season 7 Episode 6
- Directed by: Trey Parker
- Written by: Trey Parker
- Production code: 706
- Original air date: April 23, 2003

Episode chronology
← Previous "Fat Butt and Pancake Head"	Next → "Red Man's Greed"
- South Park season 7

"Lil' Crime Stoppers" is the sixth episode of the seventh season of the American animated television series South Park, and the 102nd episode of the series overall. It first aired on Comedy Central April 23, 2003.

In the episode, Stan, Kyle, Cartman and Kenny start a Junior Detective's Club and are soon recruited by the Park County police department, naming them "junior deputies". However, the boys soon find out that being real detectives isn't as fun as they thought.

== Plot ==
Stan, Kyle, Cartman and Kenny decide to play detective; they go around the town solving minor "crimes" for a dollar. They first investigate the disappearance of a pie left sitting on the windowsill of an elderly couple's home. After examining the scene of the crime, they come to the conclusion (based on no evidence at all) that the husband planned to murder and dismember his wife to have the pie for himself; however, before he could go through with the plan, the pie had already been eaten by their dog, where the boys found it. Horrified by their outrageous accusations, the couple hurriedly send them away, but not before giving them the dollar they had promised.

The boys' next case involves the recovery of a little girl's stolen doll. After bringing Butters in for "questioning" and ordering him to produce a semen sample, they get a tip-off that Bill and Fosse have the doll. They manage to recover the doll from them, despite the interference of another group of kids playing FBI who attempt to assert jurisdictional privilege and take over the case.

The successful recovery gets the boys recognized by the Park County PD, and they are made Junior Detectives. However, Lieutenant Dawson, the department's head detective, immediately orders them to bust a meth lab, complaining that that mayor has been pressuring the department to take care of it. Ignorant as to the nature of a meth lab and naive to any danger, Stan knocks on the door of the lab and simply calls out, "Uh, police. Open up." The criminals open fire at the "police", but end up killing themselves, destroying the lab, and causing a great deal of property damage to the surrounding area.

Following this incident, Dawson chews the boys out for "getting careless". Meanwhile, other detectives mock the boys, and it is revealed that many of the cops on the force are corrupt. After a confrontation in the locker room, Kyle and Cartman admit they no longer want to "play detective" and suggest they return to playing laundromat owners. Stan passionately counters that he wasn't happy playing laundromat and wants his play time to "mean something". The boys agree not to quit, and rededicate themselves to the force.

The boys are next sent to a strip club owned by Gino, the leader of Colorado's largest drug cartel, which operated the original meth lab. Gino and the cartel members quickly discover that the boys are undercover cops, and another intense shoot-out ensues. Once again, despite their only weapons being finger guns and yelling "bang bang", the boys remain unharmed while nearly all of the criminals are wounded or killed, while outside Lieutenant Dawson argues with the FBI who have arrived to try to take over the situation.

Three cops show up to give the boys backup, but it is revealed that two of them, Murphy and Jenkins, are working with Gino. They shoot Hopkins, the one good cop who earlier defended the boys, though he survives. Murphy and Jenkins turn on Gino and kill him so that they can take his share of the money. However, Murphy then kills Jenkins, claiming that he was untrustworthy. Turning to the boys, Murphy announces that the only person he now cannot trust is himself, and commits suicide. The rest of the force arrives, and the boys are credited by Dawson with cleaning up the police force and are offered positions as full detectives. The boys, however, find the reality of detective work more intense than what they envisioned, and decide to go back to playing laundromat instead.

As they play in Cartman's basement, Butters emerges from the bathroom and proudly announces that he was finally able to produce a semen sample by imagining Stan's mom's breasts. The boys inform him that they aren't playing detective anymore, and no longer need a semen sample. Cartman, though, offers Butters to have his pants cleaned for $4.95.

== Production ==
The episode is a parody of crime drama shows like CSI. On the DVD commentary, Trey Parker said that the episode is based on his childhood, where he had a desk and a rolodex in his parents' basement and played junior detective.

== Home release ==
"Lil' Crime Stoppers", along with the fourteen other episodes from The Complete Seventh Season, were released on a three-disc DVD set in the United States on March 21, 2006. The sets included brief audio commentaries by Parker and Stone for each episode. IGN gave the season an 8/10.
