= Red Man's Greed =

- South Park episode
- Episode no.: Season 7 Episode 7
- Written by: Trey Parker
- Production code: 707
- Original air date: April 30, 2003

Guest appearance
- Alex Glick as himself

Episode chronology
← Previous "Lil' Crime Stoppers"	Next → "South Park Is Gay!"
- South Park season 7

"Red Man's Greed" is the seventh episode of the seventh season and the 103rd overall episode of the Comedy Central series South Park, first broadcast on April 30, 2003. It is a parody of the removal of several Native American tribes from their lands from 1830 to 1847. The episode references the 2002–2004 SARS outbreak and features fan Alex Glick, who won a guest voice role in the episode in a contest.

In the episode, the owners of the Three Feathers Native American Casino have acquired the town of South Park. The citizens are being forced off their land to make way for a new super highway. Faced with saying goodbye to their friends and their way of life, the boys rally the townspeople to fight back against the rich and powerful Native Americans.

== Plot ==
The boys and their parents go to a Native American casino on a Native American reservation. Kyle's father ends up losing his house betting on blackjack, due to him having a gambling problem. The entire town is bought out by the Native Americans, who plan to tear it down so that they can build a superhighway connecting their casino to Denver. The inhabitants are forced to leave their homes unless they can come up with $300,000 by the next day.

The boys meet with some of the other children in town to come up with an idea. An unfamiliar new boy named Alex points out that they have to save the town. The boys advise their parents to get all the money they have, and then go bet it at the casino. If they win a round of roulette, they would have enough money to buy back the town, plus $50,000. They win, and bet all their winnings again on the hopes of winning $12,250,000, and lose. When they are selling their homes, Stan, Kyle, Cartman, and Kenny try to get them to stand up for the town, as does Alex. The adults say they will move to Middle Park instead, to which the boys say "...until the Native Americans come to take Middle Park too." The boys run outside and stand in front of the Native Americans' bulldozers, blocking their path. The townspeople soon join the boys, whilst singing "Love Is a Battlefield." The casino's owner, Chief Runs With Premise, plots another way to get rid of the townspeople.

The Chief decides to give blankets to the townspeople as a peace offering, after infecting the blankets with SARS (mirroring the events of the siege of Fort Pitt). The whole town gets sick, except for Stan, and his father tells him he must cure SARS, or only 98% of the town would be left. At the same time, the casino owner's son, Premise Running Thin, gets infected with SARS accidentally because he had shared a drink with one of the Chinese men, and none of the Native Americans' herbs are able to cure him. The owner decides to take out his anger on the townspeople with Operation Shock and Awe. Stan goes to a wise old man in a trailer in another town, who gives him an inward journey brought on by sniffing paint thinner. He discovers the trailer-living white man's way to cure the illness is Campbell's chicken noodle soup, DayQuil, and Sprite, and hands the mixture to the people of South Park, who all recover.

The casino chief arrives and is shocked to find the people are healthy and not half-dead. He begs them for the cure to SARS for his son, offering them a $5 coupon. The chief's wife gives him a disapproving look and a nudge, so he instead gives the titles back to the South Park residents. Alex notes the lesson that South Park is more than just a town, but a community of people that cannot easily be split up. Stan, visibly irritated at the new kid's presence, asks him who he is, and he responds that he is Alex Glick, a fan who was granted the opportunity to do a guest voice role. Kyle tells him to leave, and Alex does so, breaking the fourth wall to say hello to his family before walking off-screen, ending the episode.

== Home release ==
"Red Man's Greed", along with the fourteen other episodes from The Complete Seventh Season, were released on a three-disc DVD set in the United States on March 21, 2006. The sets included brief audio commentaries by Parker and Stone for each episode. IGN gave the season an 8/10.

== See also ==
- "Here Comes the Neighborhood", a similar premise from the fifth season involving African Americans.
