= South Park Is Gay! =

- South Park episode
- From left to right: Kenny, Stan, Kyle, and Cartman as metrosexuals.
- Episode no.: Season 7 Episode 8
- Written by: Trey Parker
- Production code: 708
- Original air date: October 22, 2003

Episode chronology
← Previous "Red Man's Greed"	Next → "Christian Rock Hard"
- South Park season 7

"South Park Is Gay!" is the eighth episode of the seventh season and the 104th overall episode of the American animated sitcom South Park. It originally aired on Comedy Central in the United States on October 22, 2003. In the episode, Kyle struggles to understand a new metrosexual fad that has sprung around the men and boys of South Park and is the only one who does not want to conform to it. The episode features a parody of the TV show Queer Eye for the Straight Guy.

The episode was written and directed by series co-creator Trey Parker. In 2011, he and co-creator Matt Stone listed it as one of their least favorite episodes of the series. However, the "crab people" segment has become one of the sitcom's most iconic moments.

== Plot ==
After the TV show Queer Eye for the Straight Guy begins showing, metrosexuality becomes extremely popular among the males, who all begin acting effeminately. At the school bus stop, instead of their usual winter clothing, Stan, Cartman, and Kenny wear feminine clothing. Kyle, whom they pressure into conforming but who later returns to his normal self, is beaten up by Craig, Token, Jason, and Tweek at school, and is abandoned by Cartman, Kenny, and even Stan. Mr. Garrison and Mr. Slave, the town's gay couple, are initially excited but quickly turn against the fad when they realize that metrosexuals are straight men imitating gay culture and lifestyle, which Garrison believes insults actual gays. The women of the town initially enjoy their husbands' improved hygiene and willingness to communicate, but soon tire of the men's increasing self-absorption. When they confront the men and boys about this, Randy accuses them of being "metrophobic" and the other males concur, consequently becoming even more feminine.

Hoping to end the fad, Kyle, Mr. Garrison, and Mr. Slave go to New York to kill the Fab Five, the hosts of "Queer Eye". Their mission fails but the Fab Five decide against pressing charges. Mr. Garrison then tries to talk the nonchalant gay stars out of selling out gay culture for mere ratings, which they ignore. Mr. Garrison demands to know how gays could betray their own people, slowly realizing that they are not actually gay at all. The five suddenly gravely turn to the others and their human bodies burst open, revealing themselves as an ancient race of "Crab People".

Captured by the Crab People (who chant "Crab People" repeatedly), the gay couple and Kyle fail to stop the crabs from executing their plans of ruling the Earth by destroying the human race (through changing men into metrosexuals) and are forced to become Crab People instead; however, the women attack and kill the Queer Eye quintet, explaining afterwards that masculinity really makes males attractive, even if said males are gross. The Queer Eye producers are about to press charges on the women until they discover that the Fab Five were not human, noting that the Crab People tried this before with The Jeffersons. They decide instead to "bring back the Latin fad", which the citizens of South Park slavishly adopt.

At school, Stan, Kenny, and Cartman accept Kyle again, but when he complains that they previously forsook him, the others call him "gay" and go and play football. He initially walks away in the opposite direction, but then, he stops, turns around, and reluctantly goes to play with them.

== Production ==
Parker and Stone have since criticized the third-act twist of "crab people" and consider the episode one of their worst. Though they brainstormed for hours to improve the episode (after having deleted the initial subplot of Mr. Garrison leading the other gay people in South Park to "compete" with the metrosexuals), they were unable to come up with anything better than crab people. Executive producer Anne Garefino particularly criticized the idea, deeming it "stupid." Parker later noted that "'Crab people' became this thing [in the writers' room]. It's like, you just know there's something better, but you can't think of it, and now you've just got to go with crab people."

In the DVD commentary, Stone called the Crab People "the worst idea we've ever had." Despite Parker and Stone's distaste for the characters, however, the Crab People have actually become fairly popular villains with fans of the show.

In the Season 8 episode "Quest for Ratings", Eric Cartman suggests the Crab People while brainstorming ideas for a news show. They are also mentioned at the end of the Season 9 episode "Two Days Before the Day After Tomorrow", where they are blamed for destroying the Beaverton dam. The Crab People also appear in the video games The Stick of Truth and The Fractured but Whole.

== Home media ==
"South Park Is Gay!", along with the fourteen other episodes from The Complete Seventh Season, were released on a three-disc DVD set in the United States on March 21, 2006. The sets included brief audio commentaries by Parker and Stone for each episode. IGN gave the season an 8/10.
