= ¡Casa Bonita Mi Amor! =

2024 documentary film

- Film poster
- Directed by: Arthur Bradford
- Produced by: Jennifer Ollman
- Starring: Trey Parker; Matt Stone
- Cinematography: P.H. O'Brien
- Edited by: Chad Beck; Devin Concannon; Paul Frost
- Music by: Giancarlo Vulcano
- Production companies: MTV Documentary Films; Sweet Relief Productions
- Distributed by: Paramount+
- Release dates: September 6, 2024 (Denver); September 13, 2024 (select theaters)
- Running time: 88 minutes
- Country: United States
- Language: English
- Box office: $128,531

¡Casa Bonita Mi Amor! is a 2024 American documentary film directed by Arthur Bradford. It is about Trey Parker and Matt Stone buying Casa Bonita, a Mexican restaurant in Colorado that was a prominent setting in a 2003 South Park episode titled "Casa Bonita". Parker and Stone spend over $30 million renovating the decaying restaurant, far over their original $6.5 million budget.

The film premiered at the 2024 Tribeca Festival and the 51st Telluride Film Festival. It was released on September 6, 2024, in Denver, Colorado, and then in select theaters across the United States on September 13. It premiered on Paramount+ on October 2.

== Reception ==
=== Critical response ===
On the review aggregator website Rotten Tomatoes, 100% of 16 critics' reviews are positive, with an average rating of 7.6/10. Metacritic, which uses a weighted average, assigned the film a score of 81 out of 100, based on 4 critics, indicating "universal acclaim".

Peter Debruge of Variety wrote, "A hilarious behind-the-scenes account of that ill-advised investment, MTV Documentary Films' unconventional — and unexpectedly inspiring — makeover doc follows along as the pair sink millions into rescuing the crumbling landmark out of bankruptcy." Christian Zilko of IndieWire gave the film a B+ and wrote, "It's a story about an ill-advised business investment that nearly becomes catastrophic, two creative moguls who apply the same perfectionism to the themed restaurant business as their media empire, and most of all, what happens when one of the world's most public cynics finds something worth believing in."

=== Box office ===
As of September 22, 2024, ¡Casa Bonita Mi Amor! has made $112,441 at the box office and is showing at 14 theaters. It is one of the highest-grossing documentaries of 2024.
