= Casa Bonita (South Park) =

- South Park episode
- Episode no.: Season 7 Episode 11
- Directed by: Trey Parker
- Written by: Trey Parker
- Production code: 711
- Original air date: November 12, 2003

Episode chronology
← Previous "Grey Dawn"	Next → "All About Mormons"
- South Park season 7

"Casa Bonita" is the eleventh episode of the seventh season of the American animated television series South Park, and the 107th episode of the series overall. It first aired on Comedy Central in the United States on November 12, 2003. In the episode, Cartman misleads Butters into going missing in order to gain an invitation to Kyle's birthday party. The titular restaurant in the episode is based on the real-life Casa Bonita, a Mexican-themed restaurant in Lakewood, Colorado.

The episode was written by series co-creator Trey Parker. The show's writing team had the idea of Cartman convincing Butters to disappear long before the episode's production. The rest of the episode's storyline and script were developed in the week preceding its broadcast. The inclusion of Casa Bonita was based on the crew's memories of going there as children; Parker, co-creator Matt Stone, director Eric Stough, and other members of the show's staff had visited the restaurant before. As such, the show's depiction of the restaurant is fairly accurate.

The episode received positive reviews from television critics, and is one of Parker's favorite episodes. The real-life restaurant saw an increase in visitors following the episode's airing. In August 2021, Parker and Stone announced that they had struck a deal to purchase the restaurant.

== Plot ==
Kyle announces that his mother Sheila is taking him and three of his friends to Casa Bonita for his birthday. Stan and Kenny are invited, but Cartman's initial joy is crushed when Kyle says he is taking Butters instead of him due to his rampant antisemitic behaviour. An irate Cartman denies ever having engaged in this behavior (followed by a montage of him calling Kyle a jew) and decides to prove that he is actually nice, but since kindness is such a foreign concept to him, his first attempts are unsuccessful, resulting in Cartman cursing out at Kyle and hoping he were dead. Eventually, Cartman succeeds by apologizing for his actions and Kyle is touched and tells him that if Butters is unable to attend for some reason, Cartman can take his place. The first phase of his plan complete, Cartman then tells Butters that a meteor is about to hit Earth and hides him in Stan's uncle Jimbo's bomb shelter so that he does not appear in time for the trip.

Cartman is set to replace Butters when Butters' parents tearfully inform the boys that Butters is missing, causing Kyle to postpone his party until next Saturday. Cartman then tells Butters that the meteor has hit, civilization has crumbled, and that the world is filled with radioactive cannibals. Butters' disappearance causes a town search party and several days later, the police announce that they will be checking more secluded areas, such as ducts, wells, and bomb shelters, potentially ruining Cartman's plan. He then guides Butters out of the shelter, making him wear a box over his head so he cannot see that everything is actually normal under the pretense of protecting him from the radiation. Cartman relocates Butters to a broken-down gas station and locks him in an abandoned refrigerator for his protection after pretending to get bitten by a radioactive cannibal. After Cartman leaves, a garbage truck comes and takes Butters to the city dump. Butters mistakes the dump for post-apocalyptic Earth, and after finding a dog, tries to build a "new civilization." A few days later, a junkyard worker named Irene stumbles across Butters and tells him the truth about everything, noting that no meteor hit Earth, everything is okay, and the town of South Park has been searching for Butters for over a week, making Butters sadly realize that Cartman tricked him yet again. Butters than asks Irene if he can use her phone to call his parents to come pick him up, as well as the police to inform them about what Cartman did to him.

Just as the group arrives at Casa Bonita, Sheila gets a phone call informing her of what has happened to Butters. After initial relief to learn that Butters is all right, they learn of Cartman's part in him going missing, and they all angrily confront Cartman about his antics, notifying him that the police are on their way. Refusing to be defeated just as he was about to get what he wanted, Cartman makes a mad dash through the restaurant to sample every attraction and food in the last minute of freedom he has left. Cartman is finally cornered by the police, Sheila, and the boys. However, he jumps off the fake waterfall. A police officer angrily explains the trouble Cartman has caused, noting that he made an entire town panic, he lost all his friends, and will be sent to juvenile hall for a week. The officer asks Cartman if it was worth it, to which Cartman dreamily responds, "Totally."

== Production ==
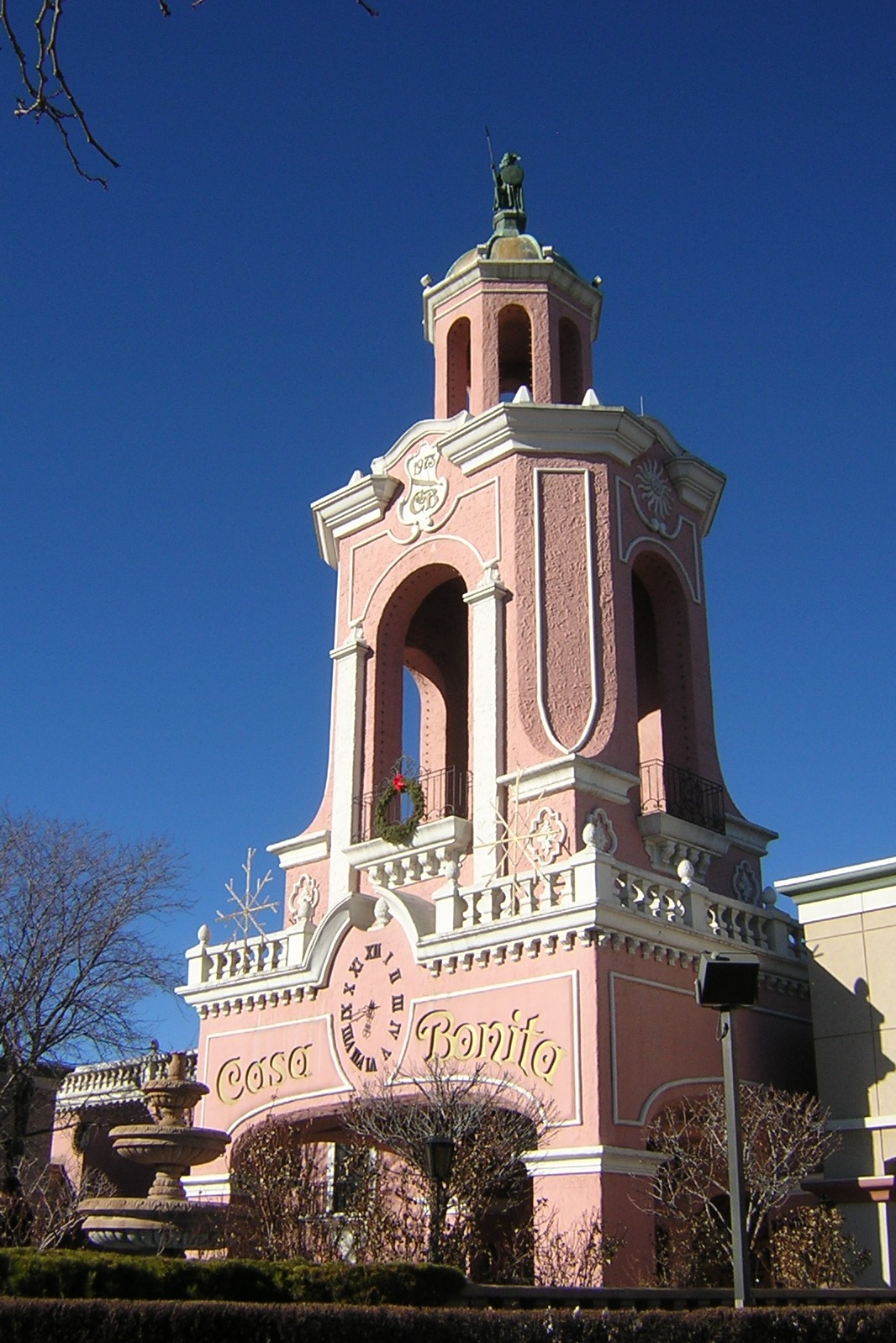
The titular restaurant in the episode is based on the real-life Casa Bonita, a Mexican-themed restaurant in Lakewood, Colorado.

"Casa Bonita" was written and directed by series co-founder Trey Parker. Like many South Park episodes, it was produced in the week preceding its broadcast. The concept for the episode came together at the last minute. One of the episode's plot elements, that Cartman convinces Butters that an asteroid is going to hit Earth, existed for a "long time" before the episode entered production. It was a Thursday—one week before the episode's airdate—when the show's writing team developed the concept that Cartman would be invited to a birthday party if Butters were unable to go.

The titular restaurant in the episode is based on the real-life Casa Bonita, a Mexican-themed "eatertainment" restaurant in the Denver suburb of Lakewood, Colorado. Parker and co-creator Matt Stone had both gone to the restaurant as children. They received clearance from Casa Bonita to use their name and likeness, which Parker and co-creator Matt Stone thought was very unusual, making them "even cooler." The restaurant inquired as to whether it would be the subject of mockery, to which Parker responded, "How can we rip on Casa Bonita? That was your dream as a kid, to be able to go to Casa Bonita for your birthday." The design of the restaurant in South Park is modeled heavily on the actual place. The show's animation director, Eric Stough, had also gone to Casa Bonita as a child, and other individuals on the crew from Kansas and New Mexico were familiar with the restaurant.

== Reception ==
Parker has called "Casa Bonita" among his top ten favorite episodes of South Park. In 2012, Mark Tornga, writing for The A.V. Club, wrote that "South Park delivered the best possible commercial for this restaurant/adventurescape with the surprisingly accurate and compelling 2003 "Casa Bonita" episode of the show. Of the hundred or so Google and Yelp reviews I've read about Casa Bonita, a solid half of them mentioned Cartman or South Park as their motivation for dining."

The actual Casa Bonita has seen a boost in visitors since the episode's airing. The Denver Post ran an article about the restaurant in 2014, and its general manager noted that the South Park episode helped its business: "Our demographics have changed slightly because of the South Park episode. We are now cool with the 18-25- year-olds [sic]."

In August 2021, the show's creators, Trey Parker and Matt Stone, announced that they had struck a deal to purchase Casa Bonita. They went over budget renovating the decaying restaurant, which was documented in the 2024 film ¡Casa Bonita Mi Amor!. Cartman's sampling of the food in the episode is referenced in the restaurant, with a prop of him sitting on a chair in one of the tables.

== Home release ==
"Casa Bonita", along with the fourteen other episodes from South Park's seventh season, were released on a three-disc DVD set in the United States on March 26, 2006. The sets included brief audio commentaries by Parker and Stone for each episode. The episode is available for streaming on Paramount+.

== See also ==
- South Park (Park County, Colorado)
- South Park City
