= Butt Out =

- South Park episode
- Episode no.: Season 7 Episode 13
- Directed by: Trey Parker
- Written by: Trey Parker
- Production code: 713
- Original air date: December 3, 2003

Episode chronology
← Previous "All About Mormons"	Next → "Raisins"
- South Park season 7

"Butt Out" is the thirteenth episode of the seventh season of the American animated television series South Park, and the 109th episode overall. It first aired on Comedy Central in the United States on December 3, 2003.

In the episode, the boys are caught smoking, but in order to avoid punishment, they blame tobacco companies for making them want to smoke. Film director and anti-smoking campaigner Rob Reiner arrives in the town and attempts to ban public smoking and bring down tobacco companies, using increasingly extreme and dishonest methods.

The episode pokes fun at the formulaic storyline of some South Park episodes (including the movie), which start with the boys getting themselves in trouble and inciting a controversy between the townsfolk and a national interest group (or a major catastrophe) while trying to avoid punishments, subsequently learning a lesson from this conflict.

== Plot ==
An overly-upbeat anti-smoking music group called Butt Out, which incorporates outdated elements of dance and hip-hop into its routine, performs at South Park Elementary. The boys are put off by what they see as the condescending nature of the performance. The performers proclaim that, if everyone refuses to smoke, they can grow up to be "just like [them]". The boys, fearing this outcome, go behind the school to immediately start chain smoking, despite it causing them to cough furiously.

When the school counselor, Mr. Mackey, approaches, the boys discard their cigarettes into a nearby dumpster, which causes a fire that burns down the entire school. When the boys are brought before the principal and their parents, the adults are enraged and ashamed at the boys smoking, more than about the school burning down. They then convince themselves that the blame lies with the tobacco companies, whose cigarette advertising campaigns have influenced the children. The boys happily transfer the blame to avoid punishment, but Kyle recognizes the pattern of a South Park storyline and unsuccessfully tries to get his friends to avoid the coming calamity.

The town summons celebrity spokesman Rob Reiner to combat the spread of smoking among children in South Park. Although Reiner is outspokenly against smoking, he is gluttonous, obese and disrespectful, taking pride in imposing his will on others. Cartman, however, looks up to Reiner precisely because of these qualities.

Reiner disguises himself as a woman called "Rita Poon" and infiltrates a tobacco factory along with the boys. While touring the factory, the vice president teaches them the history of tobacco and how the tobacco industry protects and defends freedom, explaining how the mandated warning labels on cigarettes enable consumers to make an informed choice, which Kyle finds reasonable. Suddenly, Reiner takes a photo of the boys in the factory, sheds his disguise, and throws one of the employees over the railing before fleeing.

Reiner takes the boys back to his anti-smoking encampment and introduces them to the "decent and caring" people of his Anti-Smoking staff, who are shown to be pale, hunched-over, hissing, and dressed in black. Reiner plans to digitally alter his photograph in order to falsely depict the executive giving cigarettes to children. By now, Stan, Kyle, and Kenny are disgusted with Reiner and his tactics, so when Reiner offers them the opportunity to appear in an anti-smoking TV commercial, they decline, but Cartman eagerly agrees.

Cartman claims in the commercial that he is dying of lung cancer from secondhand smoke, but discovers after the shoot that Reiner's group actually plans to kill him and cover it up by claiming it actually was from lung cancer. Cartman flees to his friends, who initially refuse to help him, fearing that they, too, will be killed if they were to be found with him, but eventually, they agree to help. They consider returning to the cigarette factory, as they know that the vice president there will not support Reiner's plan and will protect Cartman from him. Kyle warns again that this is following a formula, and it will lead to a confrontation between the town and the factory, where they will have to admit they lied about why they smoked and talk about what they have learned.

However, the boys go to the factory anyway, knowing that it's the only way to keep Cartman safe, and the townspeople confront them there along with Reiner. The townspeople turn on Reiner when he inexplicably reveals his evil plan, and as he attempts to justify himself, Kyle begins giving a speech (while commenting once more about how the familiar formula is unfolding). Kyle says that people need to take responsibility for their own actions, and calls Reiner a fascist for imposing his will on others. Cartman, no longer respecting Reiner, stabs him with his own fork, revealing "Reiner" to be a boneless sac filled with green goo, who completely drains. The parents then ground the four, as they now know that they smoked of their own free will, and though Stan is relieved that the ordeal is over and the four have "learned [their] lesson", Kyle disappointedly replies, "No, we didn't, dude. No, we didn't."

== Production ==
"Butt Out" was written and directed by Trey Parker. Matt Stone said the episode was inspired by a desire to spoof both California's strict smoking bans and film director Rob Reiner; Stone said, "We try not to be, 'All right, here's the point we want to make.' But things like California's smoking ban and Rob Reiner animate both of us. When we did that Rob Reiner episode, to us it was just common sense. Rob Reiner was just a great target."

A television promo for the episode showed a deleted scene involving Butters interacting with the "Butt Out" group. The final scene where Kyle tells Stan they didn't learn their lesson was not included in the episode's original broadcast.

== Theme ==
The episode satirizes anti-smoking education presentations by external providers that come across as cheesy or irritating to the young adult demographic they target, effectively negating any message they might be trying to send across. The episode also satirizes adult pretension, a common theme in South Park episodes, in their ineffective and nonsensical responses to the smoking problem in South Park. According to Brian C. Anderson, it also lampoons the pretentiousness of the Hollywood movie industry and liberalism, particularly through the use of Rob Reiner, the real-life American director widely known for advocating smoking restrictions. Reiner and, by extension, Hollywood adopts a holier-than-thou attitude with regard to smokers, and show a lack of understanding toward the poor and middle-class.

The episode advocates accepting personal responsibility for smoking rather than blaming the tobacco industry or external forces like Hollywood and television (which are often accused of condoning and glamorizing drug use, particularly with alcohol and tobacco); as such, tobacco executives are portrayed as reasonable and decent, while Reiner and Hollywood representatives are nasty and elitist. Another theme is Rob Reiner constantly eating and overweight to the point that he can't fit through a car door, pointing out that although fast food is also dangerous, it is overlooked.

== Reception ==
"Butt Out" received mostly positive reviews. Conservative writer Brian C. Anderson praised the episode saying the portrayal of Reiner, Hollywood and their anti-smoking efforts "perfectly captures the Olympian arrogance and illiberalism of liberal elites." Anderson said this was particularly illustrated by a scene in the episode in which Reiner yells at a sawmill worker for smoking in a bar, and tells him he should relax by spending time in an expensive vacation house like Reiner does. Anderson described it as a "classic sequence".

Amanda Kiser of The Battalion praised the episode's portrayal of anti-smoking educational performances: "Watch the 'Butt Out' episode of South Park if you were not fortunate enough to witness such a spectacle as a preteen. Granted, the truth is substantially less ridiculous, but it is still incredibly, nauseatingly self-consciously hip." Richard Ives of Times Higher Education also praised this aspect of this episode: "Teachers to whom I've shown these clips sigh in recognition." The Daily Record of Scotland praised the episode, which they said was extremely "timely".

In a 2017 Reddit interview with fans, when asked of his portrayal in the episode, Rob Reiner's reply was "I thought it was funny, but I'm not quite that fat."
