= Doug Fabrizio =

American radio host and commentator

- Born: July 18, 1964 (age 62); Bountiful, Utah, U.S.
- Education: University of Utah
- Occupation: radio host at KUER-FM
- Known for: RadioWest and Utah Now
- Spouse: Alice Storm

Doug Fabrizio (born July 18, 1964) is an American radio host and commentator. He is the host of RadioWest, a popular talk show heard on KUER; RadioWest is syndicated by PRI, with a focus on the western United States and especially Utah.

Fabrizio began working for the University of Utah FM news/music station KUER in 1987, and became news director in 1993. In 2001, he was one of the originators of the program RadioWest on the station. The format then, as at present, is a 55-minute interview with an invited prominent guest on a pre-announced topic. Listeners are usually able to call in with questions or comments. After a few years of growing audience acceptance and participation, the show was picked up for broadcast on Sirius XM Public Radio, where it aired for 5 years. On RadioWest, Fabrizio has hosted figures including Madeleine Albright, Isabel Allende, the Dalai Lama, and Desmond Tutu.

Fabrizio has also been a host of Utah Now, a television program on the University of Utah's educational television station KUED.

His interview skills landed him a spot as a guest host of the national NPR program Talk of the Nation. Fabrizio was invited to host NPR's Morning Edition, for which he has commented that he was a "terrible host." Fabrizio was the keynote speaker for the 2010 Utah Genius event.

== Awards and recognitions ==
Fabrizio has been recognized or awarded for his participation in or support of various causes. He has been cited by the Society of Professional Journalists, the Utah Broadcasters Association, the Public Radio News Directors Association, and the Academy of Television Arts & Sciences.

== See also ==
- KUER-FM
- KUED
