= Casa Bonita =

Mexican-themed restaurant in Lakewood, Colorado

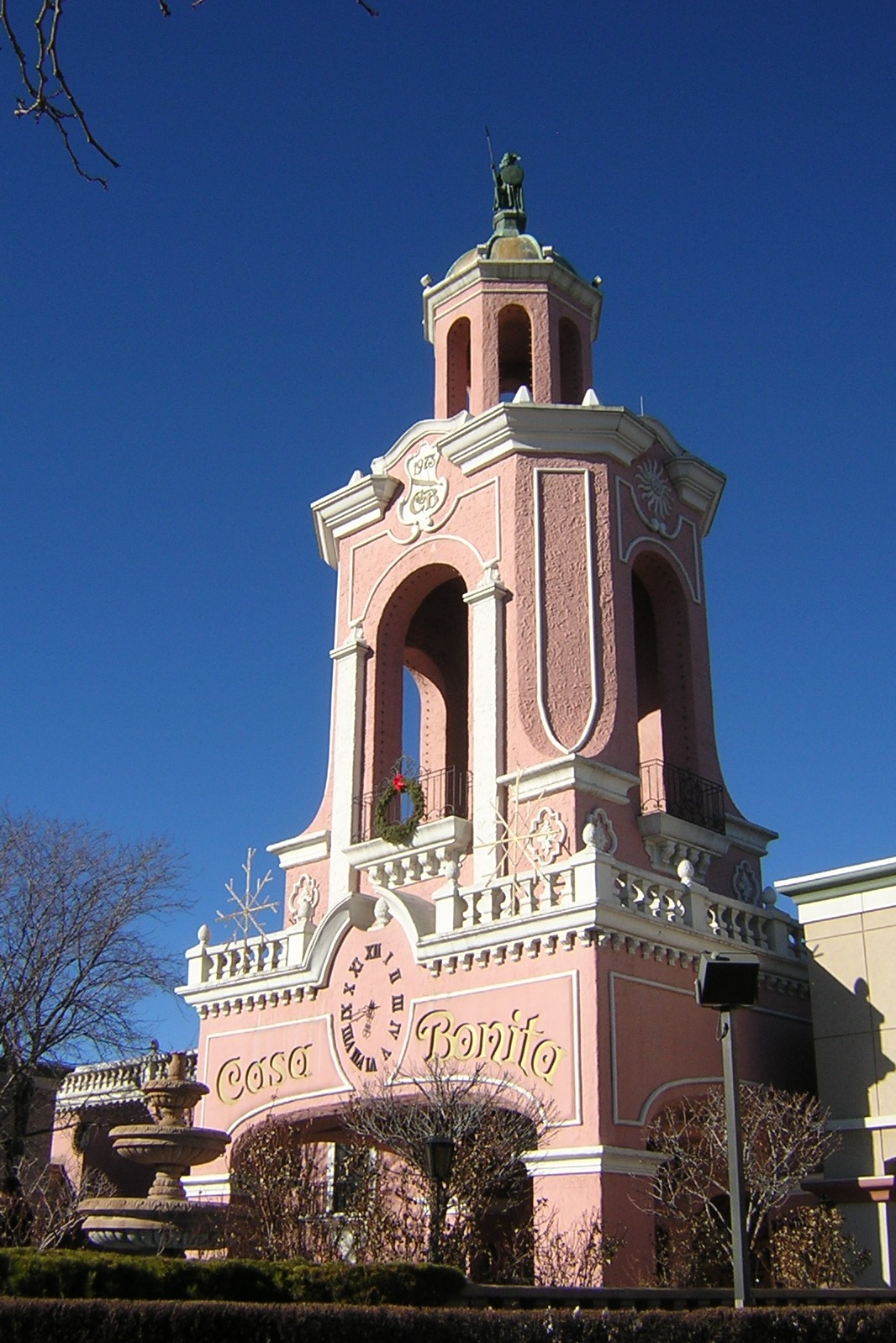
- The front façade of the Casa Bonita located in Lakewood, Colorado
- Interactive map of Casa Bonita

Restaurant information
- Established: 1968–1993 (original restaurant); 1971–2011 (Tulsa location); 1974–2021; 2023–present (Colorado location)
- Owners: The Beautiful House, LLC (Trey Parker and Matt Stone) (2021–present)
- Previous owners: Unigate (1982–1992); CKE Restaurants (1992–1997); Star Buffet, Inc. (1997–2021)
- Food type: Mexican
- Location: 6715 West Colfax Avenue, Lakewood, Colorado, 80214, United States
- Coordinates: 39.741927°N 105.070828°W
- Seating capacity: 1,100
- Website: www.casabonitadenver.com

Casa Bonita (lit. 'pretty house' in Spanish) is a Mexican restaurant in Lakewood, Colorado, located within the Lamar Station Plaza. It first opened in 1974 and was originally part of a chain of Mexican entertainment restaurants that started in Oklahoma City. The restaurant attracted a cult following among Coloradans since its opening and is considered by many to be an iconic establishment of Lakewood and the greater Denver metropolitan area.

In 2019, The Denver Post published a feature on the restaurant and described the decor, saying, "Its pink exterior conceals a vast network of nooks and crannies inside. While the main, multilevel dining room is decorated with plastic palm trees and strings of lights, different façades and themed rooms invoke regional Mexican architectural styles, including the resort of Puerto Vallarta." The centerpiece is a 30 foot (9.1 m) indoor waterfall with cliff divers, an imitation of the cliffs of Acapulco. The building is crowned with a gold dome and a statue of Cuauhtémoc, the last Aztec emperor of Mexico. It was designated a historic landmark of the city in March 2015.

Casa Bonita temporarily closed in March 2020 due to the COVID-19 pandemic, and its owner filed for bankruptcy in April 2021. Later that year, it was acquired by South Park creators Trey Parker and Matt Stone, who gave the restaurant a significant renovation. The restaurant held a soft relaunch beginning June 23, 2023, billing itself as The Greatest Restaurant in the World!

== History ==
Founder Bill Waugh opened the first Casa Bonita restaurant in Oklahoma City, Oklahoma, in 1968. By the mid-1970s, the chain had expanded to locations in adjacent states and was known for its "all you can eat" beef or chicken plates and offering sopapillas—small squares of fried bread served with honey—with every meal.

In 1982, Casa Bonita's parent company, which also owned Taco Bueno fast food restaurants, was sold to Unigate (later Uniq plc). In 1992, Unigate sold the restaurants to CKE Restaurants, owner of Carl's Jr. In 1997, the two remaining Casa Bonita restaurants, in Tulsa, Oklahoma, and Lakewood, Colorado, were spun off by CKE as part of Star Buffet. The Tulsa location closed in September 2005, then reopened for two years as Casa Viva, and closed again in December 2007. It was reopened by Star Buffet under the original name in late July 2008 but closed again in 2011 when Star Buffet filed for bankruptcy, leaving the Lakewood location as the last Casa Bonita. The Lakewood Historical Society designated the restaurant as a city landmark in March 2015.

In March 2020, Casa Bonita closed temporarily due to the COVID-19 pandemic, during which Colorado Governor Jared Polis placed a ban on in-person dining during the two-month span between March 17 and May 26. In March, several employees reported that their most recent paychecks had bounced due to insufficient funds in the Casa Bonita payroll account. The restaurant's website disappeared during the summer of 2020, sometime between July 7 and July 30.

On April 6, 2021, Summit Family Restaurants, Casa Bonita's owner, filed for Chapter 11 bankruptcy in the United States Bankruptcy Court for the District of Arizona. On September 23, 2021, South Park creators Trey Parker and Matt Stone reached an agreement to purchase the restaurant for $3.1 million. A group named "Save Casa Bonita" filed an objection to Parker and Stone's purchase, pointing out that they had in fact made an offer first. Their objection was later withdrawn, and the sale was completed by November 19.

Parker and Stone spent $40 million renovating the restaurant and hired Chef Dana Rodriguez to update the menu. Arthur Bradford chronicled the experience in ¡Casa Bonita Mi Amor! (2024), a makeover documentary.

The restaurant had a soft opening on May 26, 2023. Casa Bonita began taking reservations for weekends beginning June 23, 2023.

In May 2026, the duo revealed on Jimmy Kimmel Live! that the estimated $7-$8m project actually cost around $50m; however, they are still glad they did it.

== Location ==
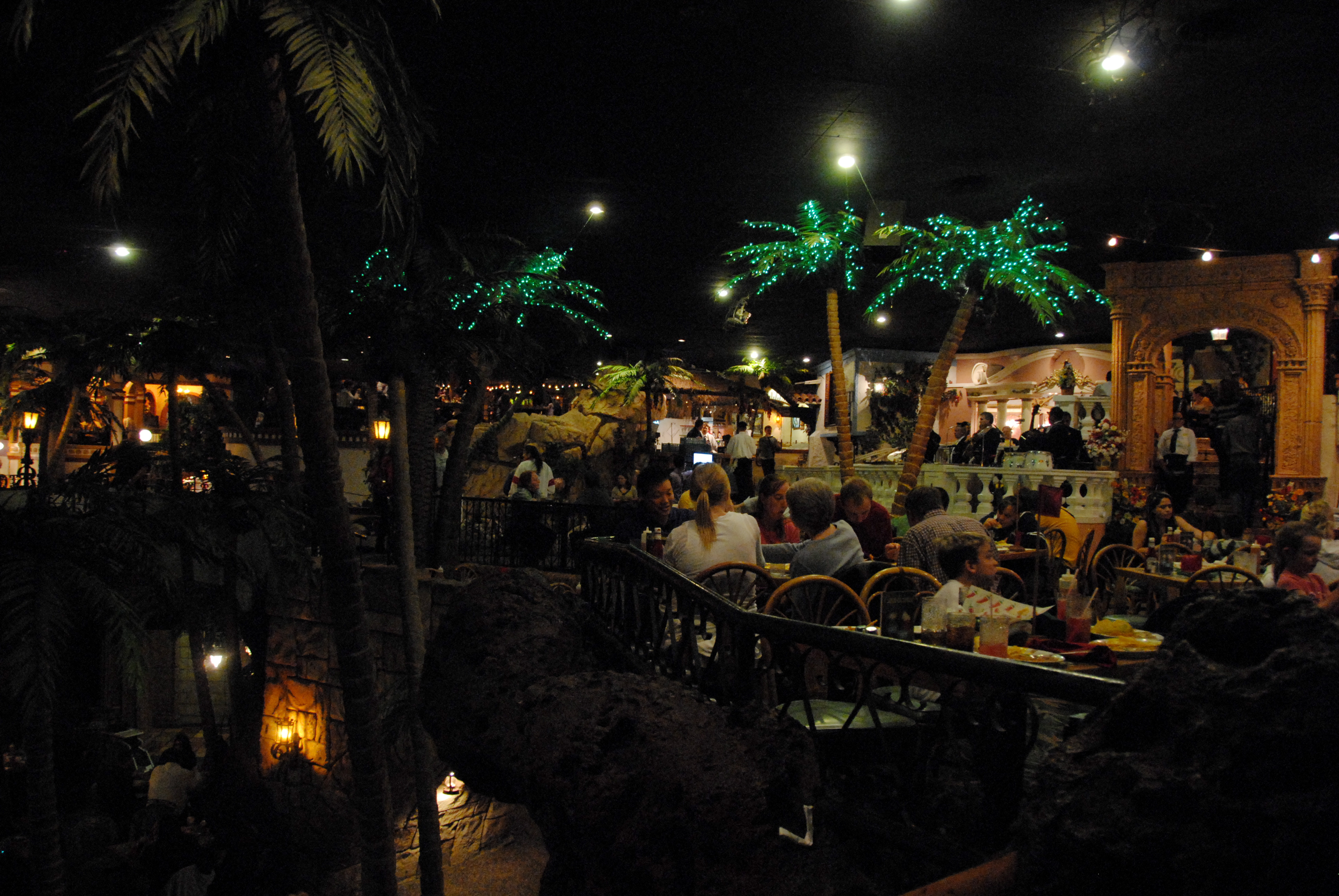
Casa Bonita interiors, Lakewood, Colorado, in 2008

The Lakewood location was built in 1973 and opened in March 1974, on Colfax Avenue west of Denver, along U.S. Route 40/I-70 Business. The building used for the restaurant started as a Joslins department store, which provided a large space to work with. Similar in architecture to the Tulsa location (both were previously large retail store locations), it features a mariachi band, flame jugglers (discontinued in 2019 due to fire code violations), cowboy fights, a gorilla, and a 30-foot (9.1 m) waterfall with cliff divers. It also has a small puppet theater, a "haunted tunnel" (Black Bart's Cave), an arcade with a large skee-ball room and a magic theater. Since 2023, as a nod to its new owners, the restaurant has references to South Park, such as a prop of Eric Cartman sitting at one of the tables, referencing the episode "Casa Bonita" and a ManBearPig meet-and-greet. The restaurant is 52,000 square feet (4,800 m^{2}) and can seat up to 1,100 patrons.

=== Dining ===
The restaurant's business model requires guests to purchase food in order to experience the restaurant. Originally, guests would enter the restaurant and enter a line to order food at a cashier, after which they would pick up their trays of food from the kitchen and carry them to their table. The menu features primarily Mexican food and drinks, and guests are brought sopapillas after their meal. Each table has a flag that can be raised to get their server's attention. Prior to the renovation, the quality of the food was criticized, with food critic Thom Wise saying that it tasted like "a cross between dorm food and TV dinners" in a 1997 review. Another critic, James B. Meadow, described the taco and beef enchiladas as "flavorless" and said that the margarita was "so over-limed, it could have singlehandedly cured Queen Victoria's navy of scurvy" in a 1989 review.

The food at Casa Bonita was drastically changed during the renovation when the new owners hired executive chef Dana Rodriguez to update the recipes and kitchen. Since the renovation, the restaurant has also introduced a reservation system, which releases slots several months in advance, with options of premium or standard seating. After going through security outside the restaurant, guests are seated and must order food and pay before they are allowed to explore the restaurant at their leisure. Instead of ordering food at a cashier and carrying it to their table, guests now order from a menu at their table and food is brought to them.

=== Cliff Divers ===
The 14-foot deep cliff diving pool is the centerpiece of the restaurant, with a waterfall flowing down into it and rugged cliffs that the divers scale as part of the performance. The cliff divers wear orange swimsuits and dive into the water below, performing tricks solo or in pairs. There is also a splash zone platform in front of the pool where guests are more likely to get wet.

=== Arcade ===
The arcade features an interactive shooting gallery, which allows guests to shoot targets with an assortment of fake guns. It also contains various arcade games, which allow the guest to win tickets which can be used to buy prizes, and a root beer bar that sells mugs of root beer. There are also Casa Bonita branded pinball machines themed after the restaurant.

=== Black Bart's Cave ===
The cave is a dark tunnel that guests can walk through, featuring different lighted and animatronic scenes. The cave is styled as the hideout of Black Bart, who is also a roaming character that interacts with restaurant guests. At the end of the cave, a display shows Black Bart's treasure hoard.

=== The Insanely Mysterious Sorsoro ===
This comedic magic show is held in a theater with a stage, across from the cliff diver pool. Sorsoro is a silent, masked magician, who also pulls audience members onto the stage to assist with tricks.

=== Puppet Show ===
The puppet show is performed in a theater adjacent to the entrance to Black Bart's Cave. The performers tell jokes in different voices and use hand puppets and marionettes to entertain the audience.

== Defunct locations ==
=== Oklahoma City, Oklahoma ===
The first Casa Bonita was opened in the summer of 1968 in Oklahoma City, at a time when Mexican food was considered a novelty in the area. The restaurant was located along U.S. Route 66 at the intersection of NW 39th and Portland. On opening, it featured themed rooms, including the Garden Room and El Pokey, a room themed as a Mexican jail. The Oklahoma City location closed in 1993. After housing other businesses, the building was demolished in 2015.

=== Tulsa, Oklahoma ===
The Tulsa location opened in 1971 near the intersection of 21st and Sheridan. The interior was designed to create the outdoor nighttime atmosphere of a Mexican village. Its various themed dining areas, with seating for over 500, included a village square with fountain, a 2-level lantern-lit cave, a tropical garden with 20 foot (6.1 m) waterfall and stream, and a room resembling an aristocratic dining hall with a porch along with strolling mariachis. The Tulsa location also included a puppet and magic show theater, a video arcade, a working carousel and a gift shop.

It closed on September 30, 2005, due to a reported inability to reach suitable lease terms with the property owner. It was reopened, as Casa Viva, in May 2006 and then closed again in December 2007. In late July 2008, the restaurant, having been sold back to its previous owner group, reopened under the original Casa Bonita name. In February 2011, the restaurant failed to reopen after lengthy snowstorms hit Tulsa, and a sign on the door said it was closed for business.

=== Little Rock, Arkansas ===
The Little Rock location opened in 1969 at the corner of University Avenue and Asher Avenue (at the time U.S. Highway 67/70), just south of the University of Arkansas-Little Rock campus. This location had many of the same features as its sister locations, including a Garden Room, an El Pokey (a room themed as a Mexican jail), a fully functioning video arcade and a gift shop. In its heyday, the Little Rock location was reported to have been the highest volume Mexican restaurant in the United States, with annual sales of up to $2,500,000. That distinction would later go to the Denver location, which would go on to post nearly $8,000,000 in sales on an annual basis.

The restaurant closed and rebranded under the ownership of the Waugh family as "Casa Viva" on August 2, 1993, after a reported $250,000 was spent in renovations. It would revert to the original Casa Bonita branding in 1995, until closing permanently in 2005.

=== Fort Worth, Texas ===
- Hulen Mall, Fort Worth, Texas (1982–1985)

== Employee relations ==
In 2023, Casa Bonita initially advertised salaries ranging from $14.27 to $15.27 for servers and bartenders, in addition to tips, and employees signed contracts earlier in the spring agreeing to the wages. In the days before public opening, the restaurant called employees to a meeting at which they were told to sign new contracts within a day or quit. The new employee compensation system removed the need for wait staff to earn tips, instead paying every employee $30 per hour, much higher than the Colorado minimum wage, $13.65. This came on the heels of a nationwide campaign to eliminate tipping in food service, owing to "tipping fatigue" on the part of customers who came to oppose the practice.

Casa Bonita employees, with help from the worker center, Restaurant Opportunities Centers (ROC) United, sent a petition to management, demanding more transparency and better communication on a number of issues.

In October 2024, employees at Casa Bonita announced their intention to form a union with Actors’ Equity and IATSE. Employees cited unsafe work conditions and pay as the primary reasons for unionization.

=== 2025 unfair labor practices charge and strike ===
In September 2025, a National Labor Relations Board unfair labor practices charge was filed against the restaurant by the restaurant's labor union Casa Bonita United. On October 30, 2025, performers at the Lakewood, Colorado, Casa Bonita went on strike for at least three days after alleging that Parker and Stone paid them unfair wages and subjected them to a less safe working environment. Actors' Equity Association (AEA) president Brooke Shields also criticized Parker and Stone's handling of the restaurant's AEA-affiliated entertainers as well. Lead AEA negotiator Andrea Hoeschen further stated that management at Casa Bonita only offered "an additional 11 cents over their last unfair wage offer, and very little for future layoff protections."

== In popular culture ==
The South Park episode "Casa Bonita" prominently features the Colorado branch of the restaurant. Other episodes that mention it briefly are: "Quest for Ratings" (where a clock is labeled as showing the time at Casa Bonita), "You Have 0 Friends", "201" (where the restaurant is reportedly destroyed), "Let Go, Let Gov" and "South ParQ Vaccination Special". Additionally, the building that houses South Park Studios was named after the restaurant. In August 2021, the show's creators, Trey Parker and Matt Stone, announced they would purchase Casa Bonita. The renovations of the restaurant are documented in the 2024 film ¡Casa Bonita Mi Amor! In one of the downloadable content packs to the video game South Park: The Fractured But Whole, the restaurant plays a central role in the story.

In 2009, rock band The Fray held the release party for their eponymous second album at Casa Bonita.

In the reboot of Roseanne, Casa Bonita is featured as the workplace of Becky Connor in Episode 4.

The music video for Collapsing Scenery's "Resort Beyond the Last Resort", directed by Kansas Bowling and starring Boyd Rice, was partially filmed at Casa Bonita.

Punk rock band SPELLS performed their song "A Huevo" at Casa Bonita.

In 2018, the Denver Broncos announced their draft picks at Casa Bonita with the help of the resident magician.

For several years, artist Andrew Novick has hosted a Casa Bonita-themed art show at Denver's NEXT Gallery. Novick has been to the restaurant more than 300 times and has given tours of it. He says of the restaurant, "every time I go there, I have a sense of wonder all over again because it's so big and there's so many things in there—like the waterfall—and you feel like you're outside, and the sounds and lights and everything in there. It's just ... it's unmatched."

== Images ==
=== Exterior ===
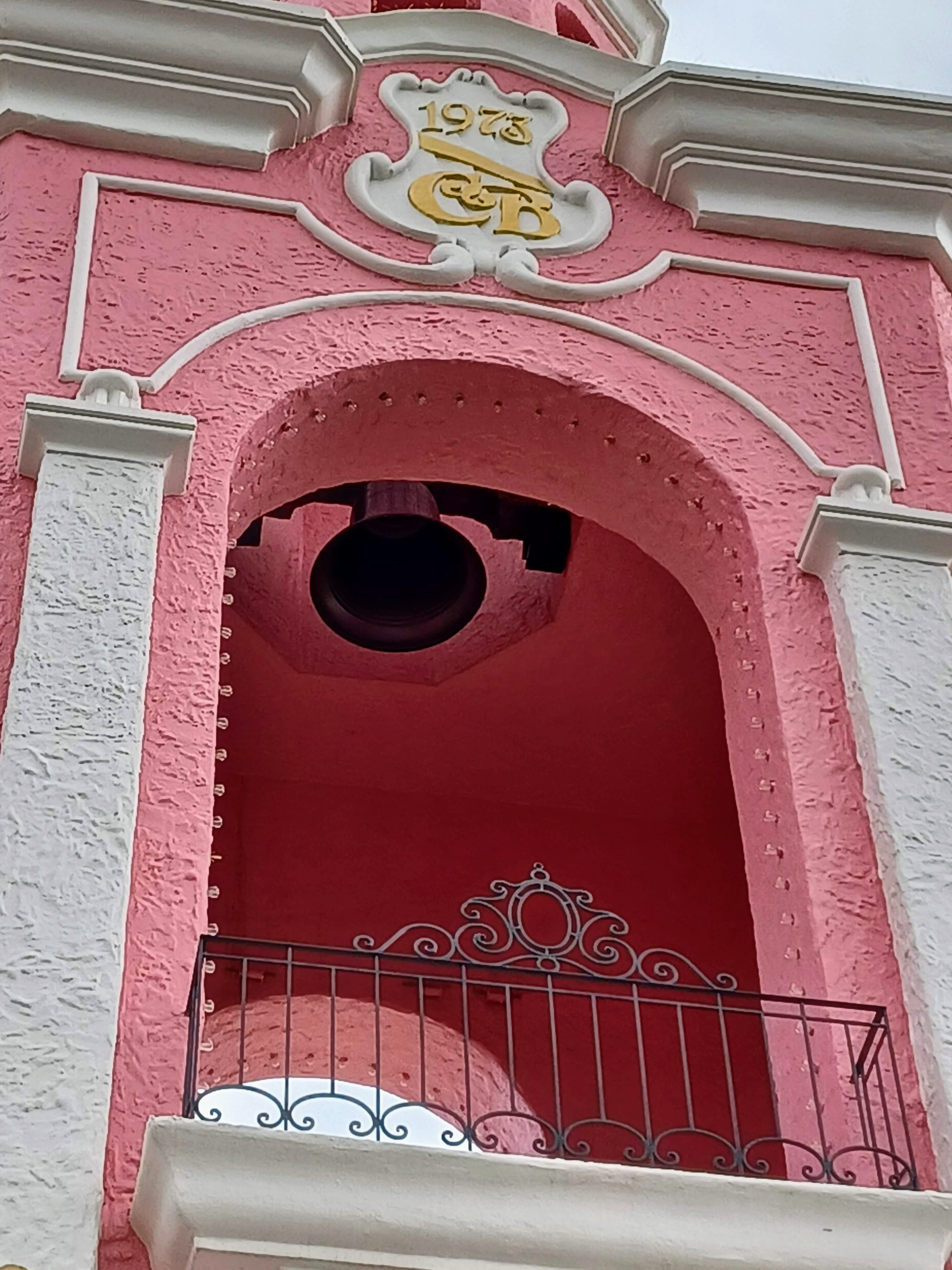
Casa Bonita tower bell

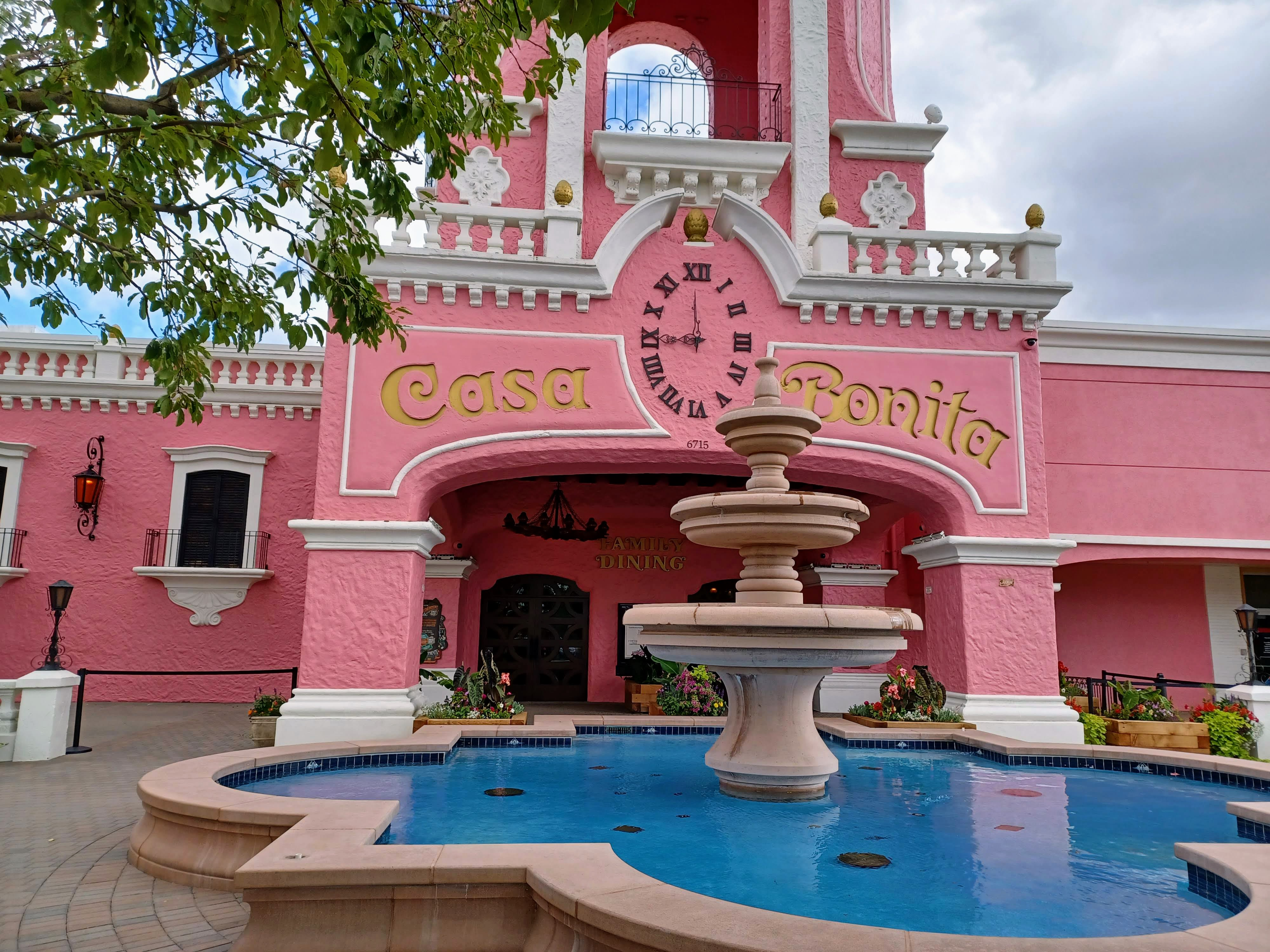
Front of the Casa Bonita, with a fountain

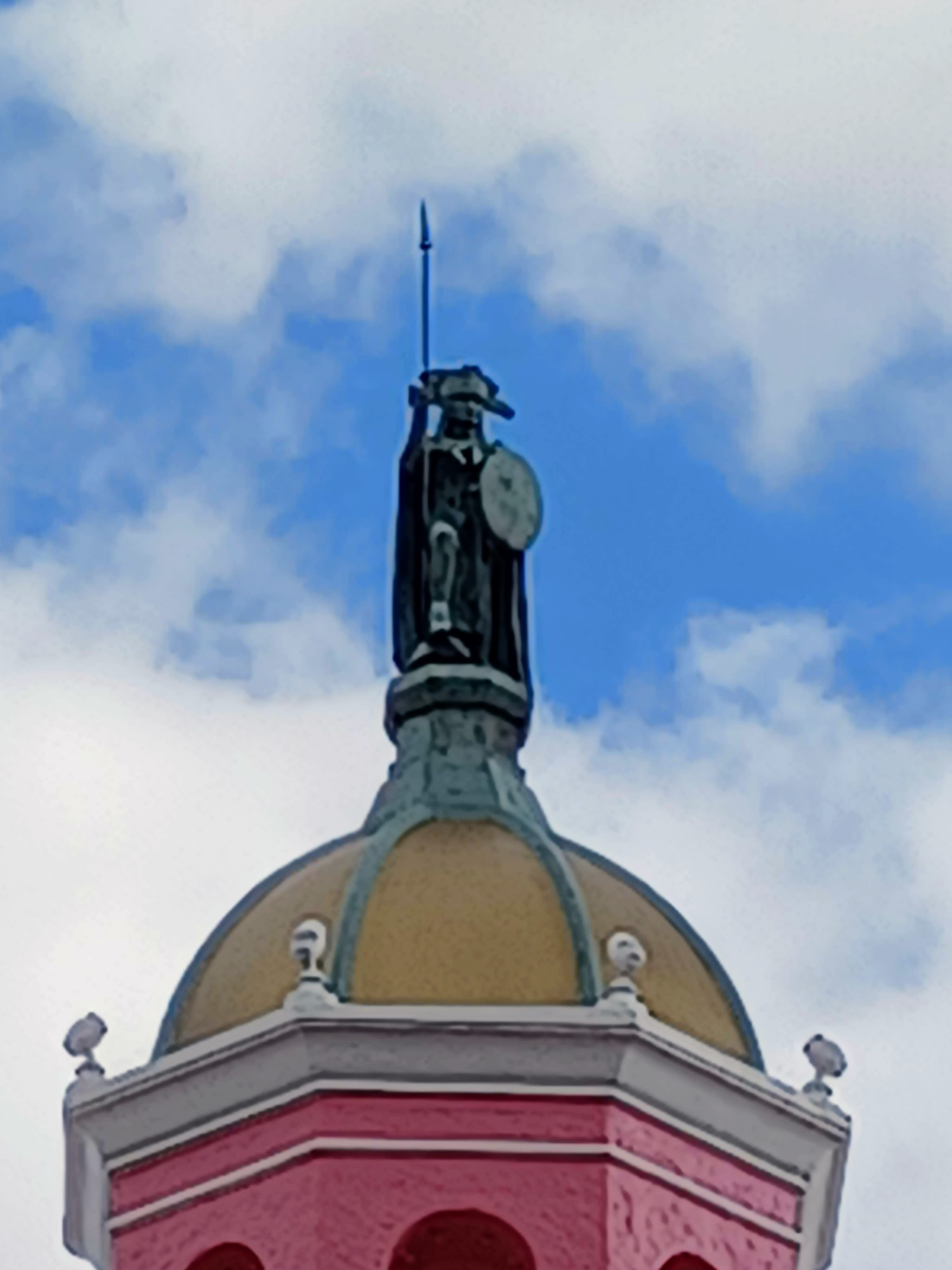
Statue of Cuauhtémoc standing above the tower dome of Casa Bonita

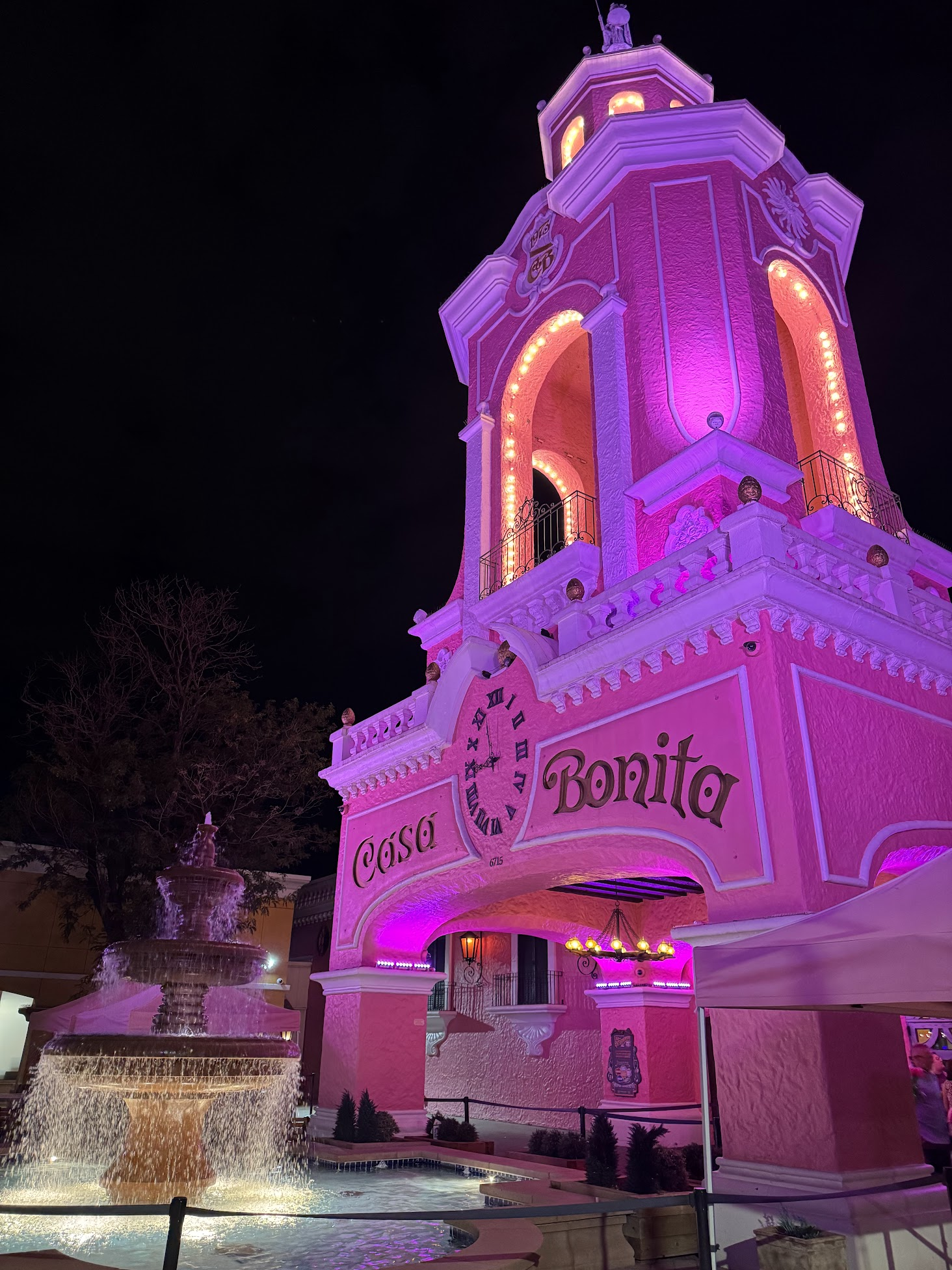
Exterior at Night

=== Interior (Pre-Renovation) ===
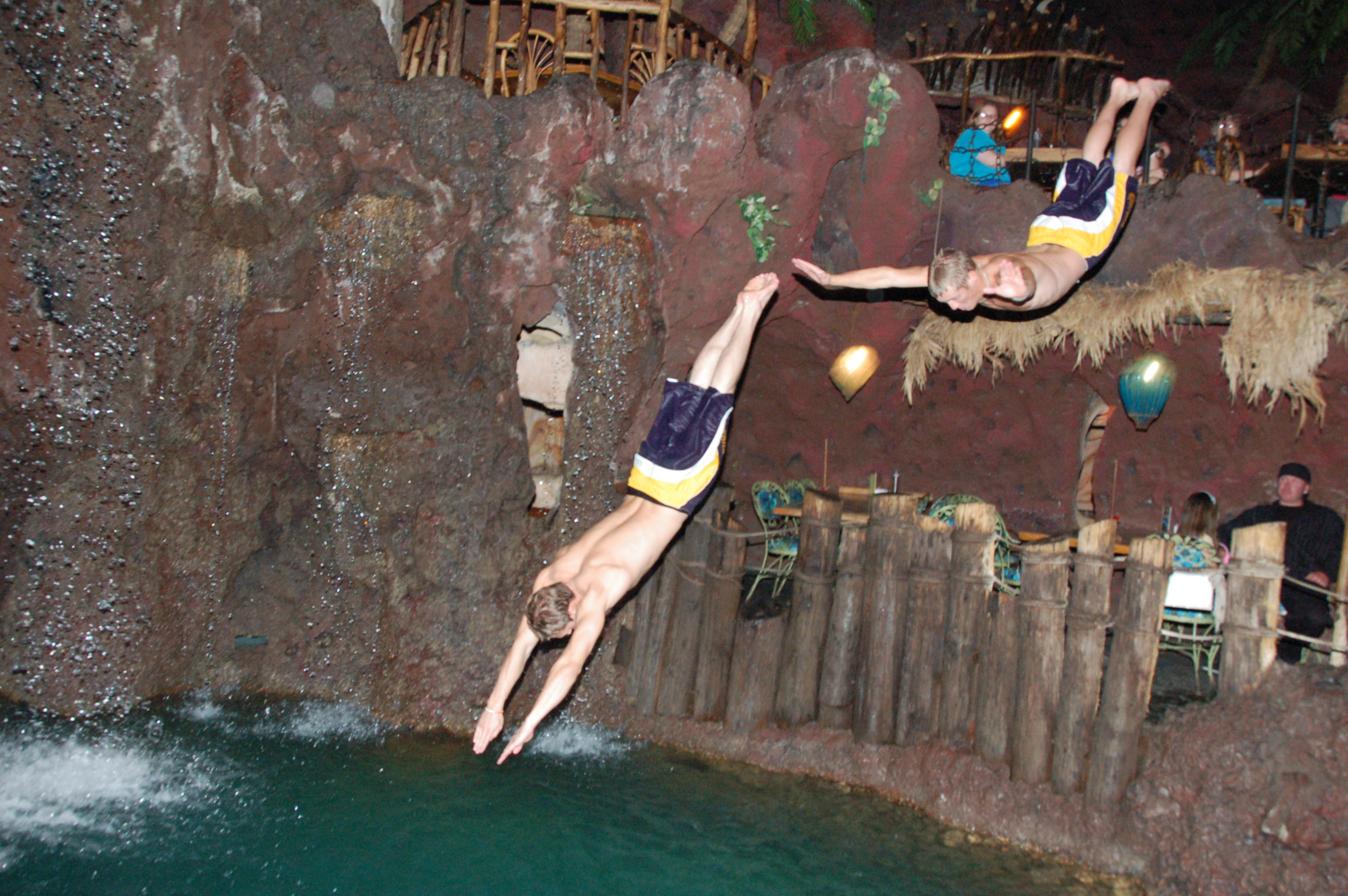
Casa Bonita cliffdivers

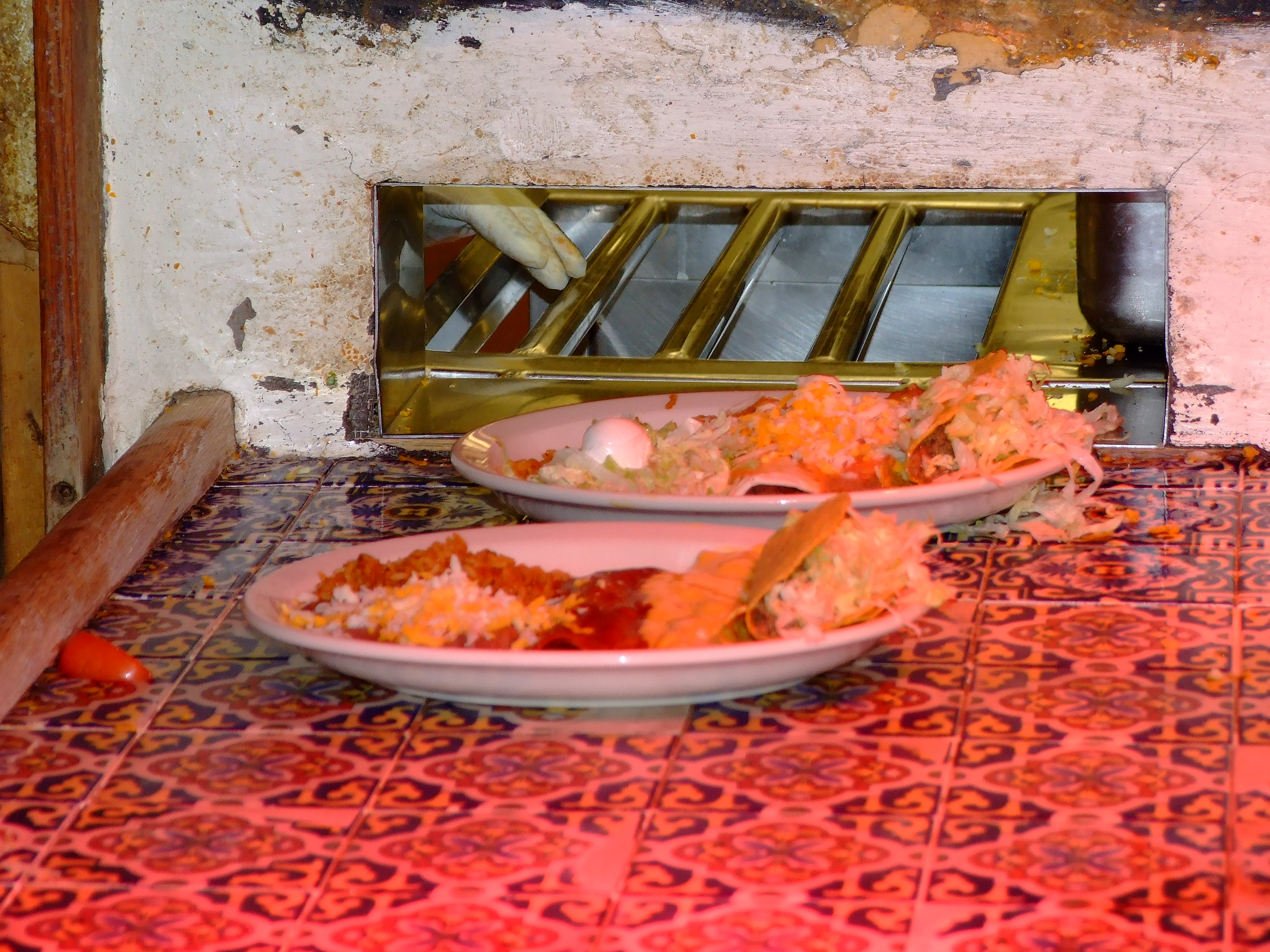
Casa Bonita food service

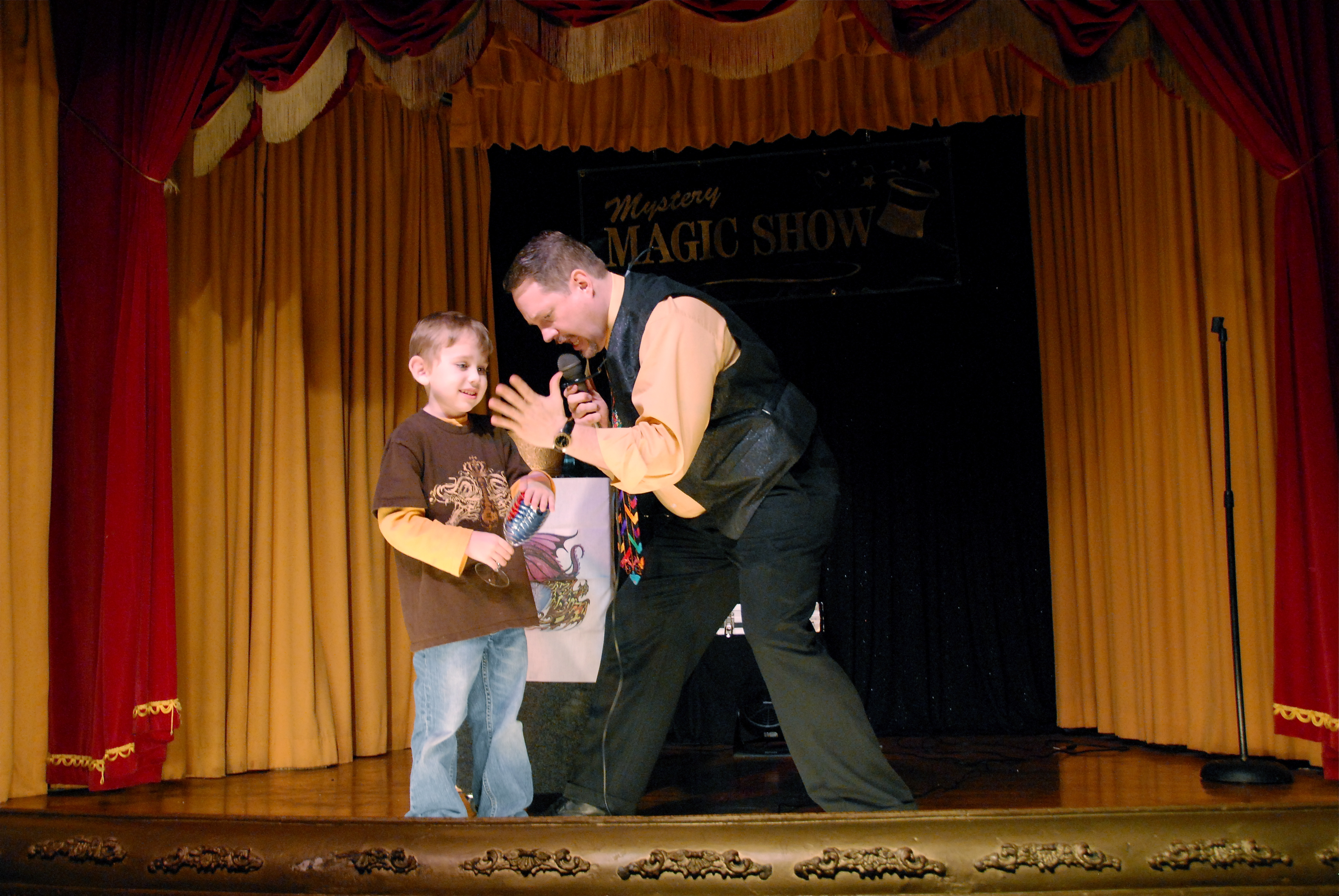
Casa Bonita magic show

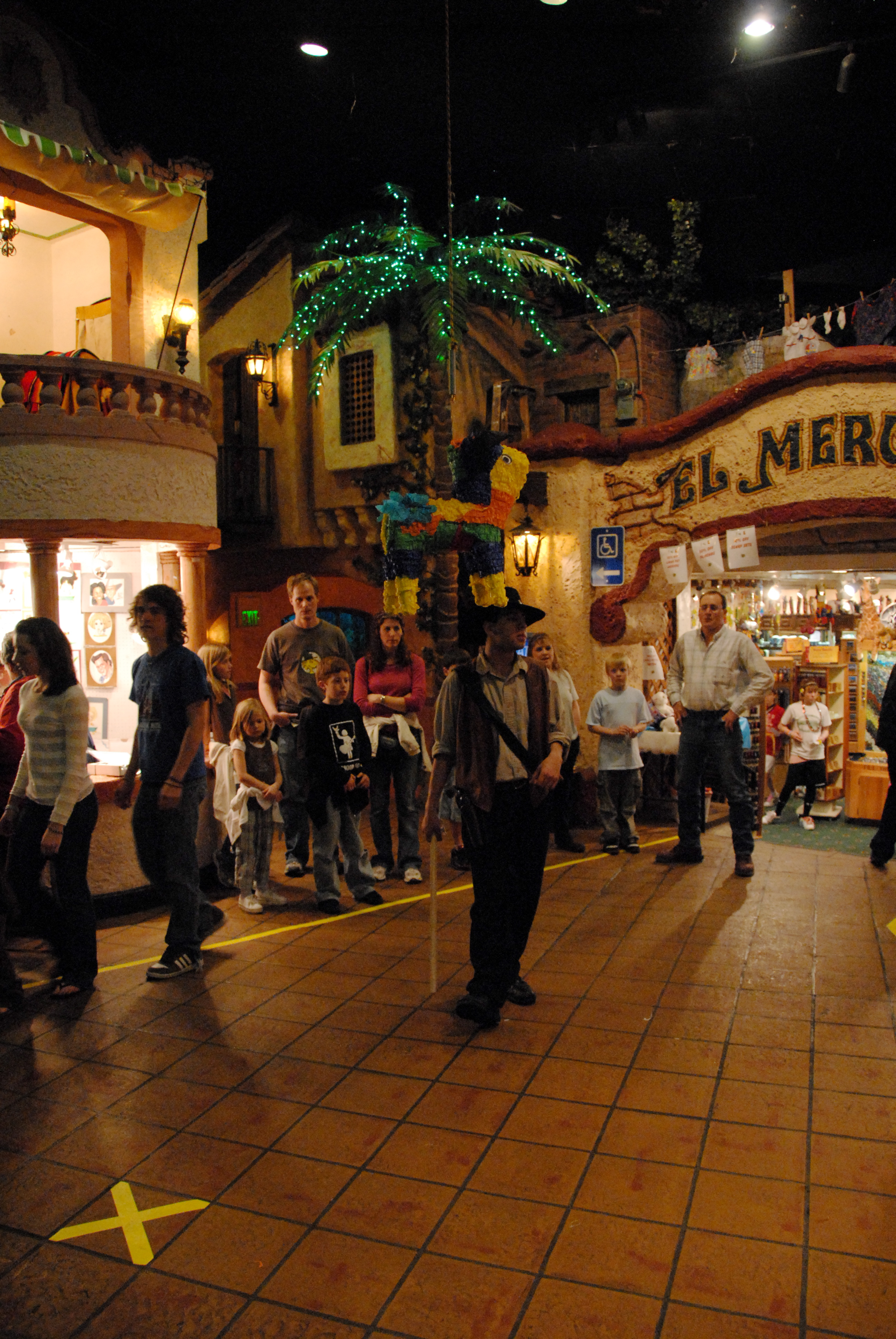
Casa Bonita piñata

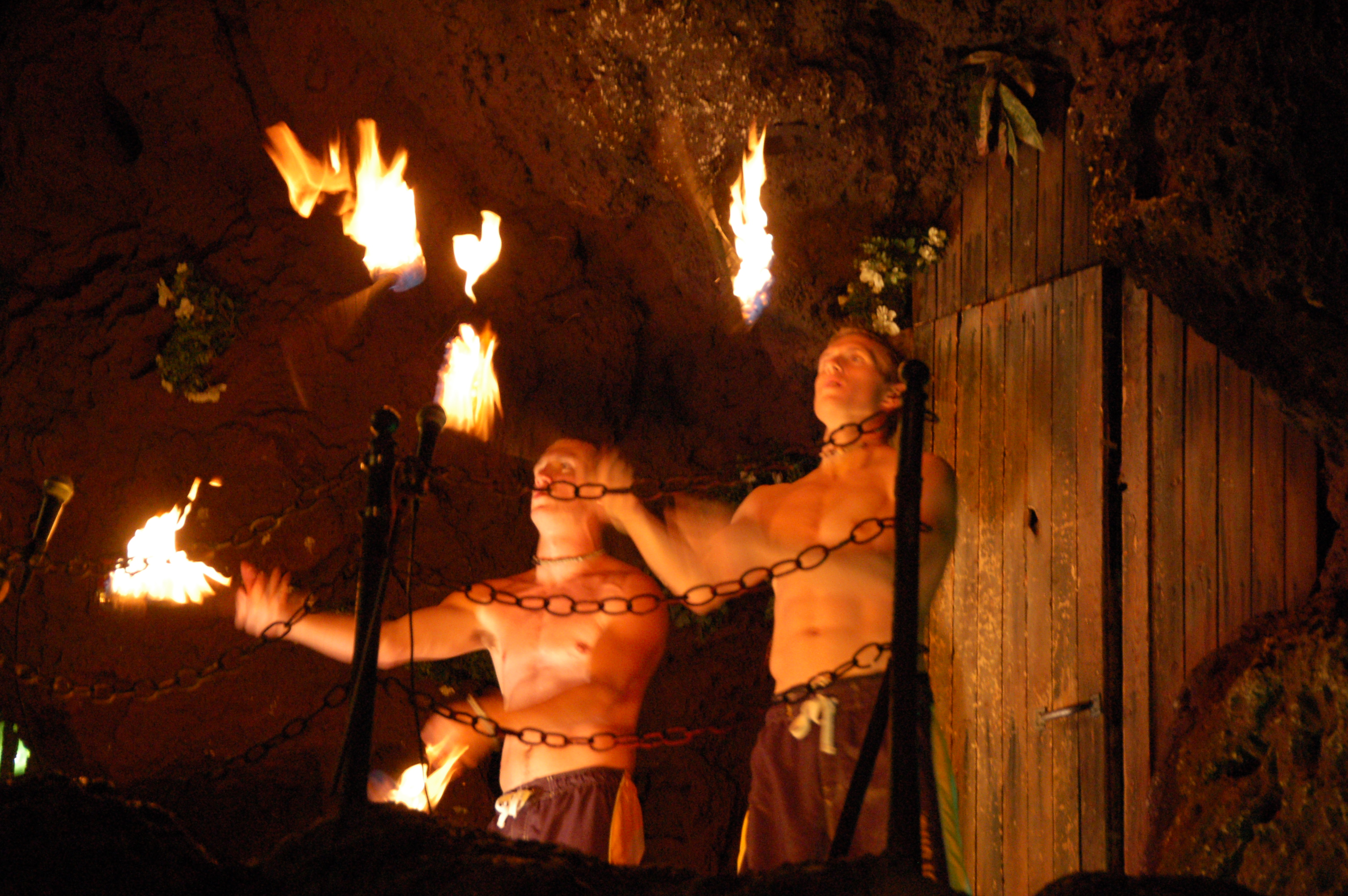
Casa Bonita torch juggling

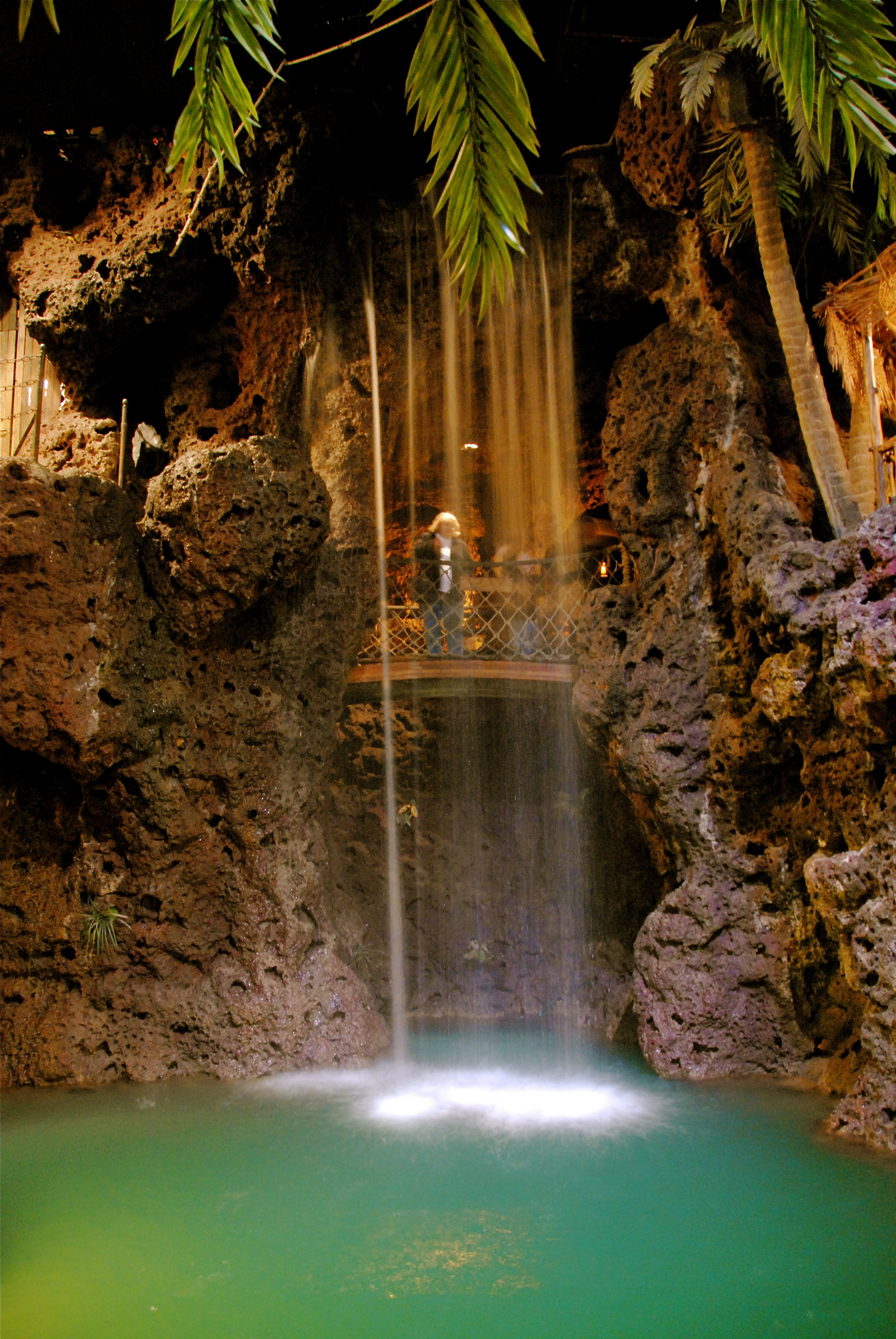
Casa Bonita waterfall

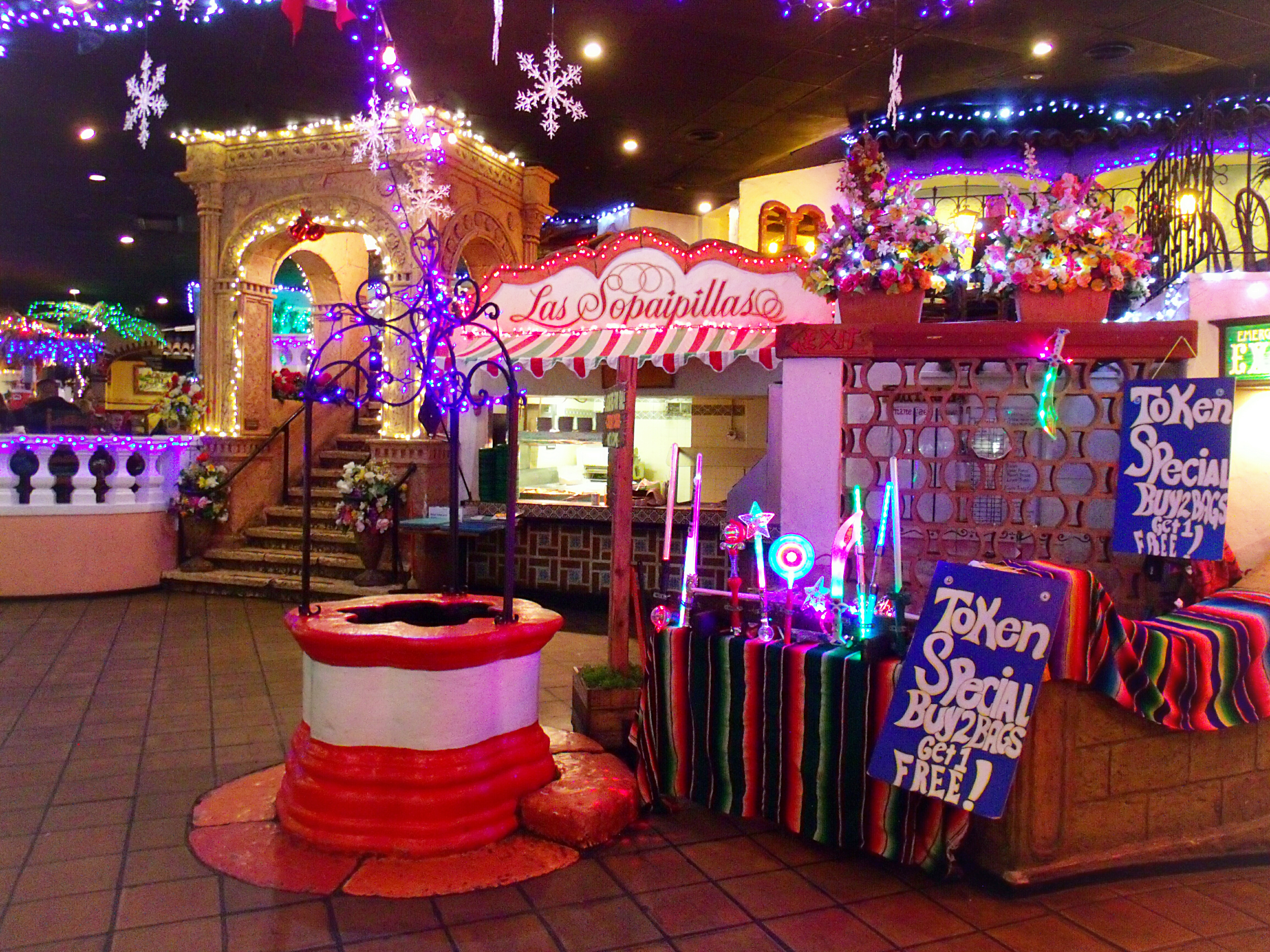
Interior of Casa Bonita

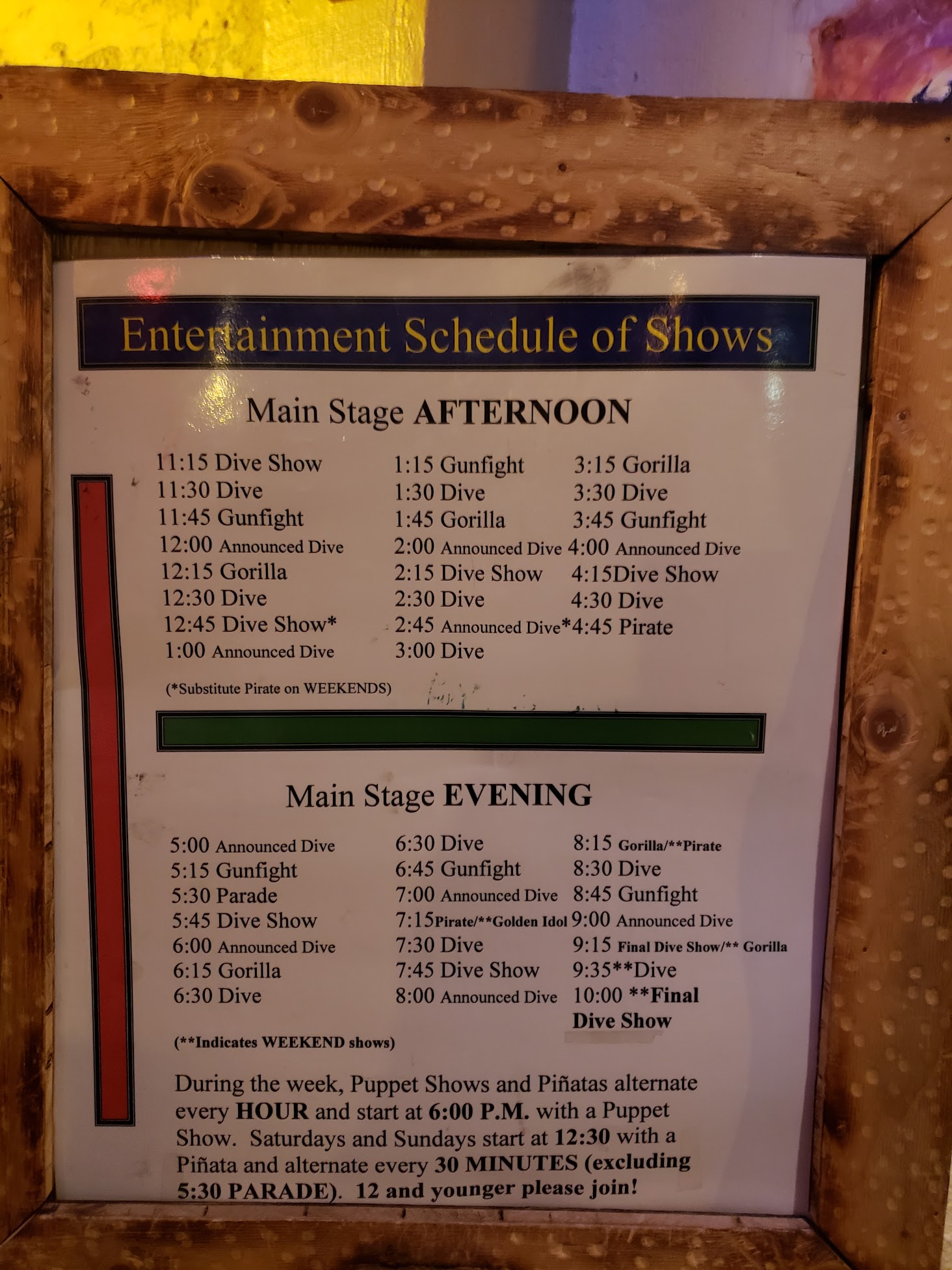
Schedule of Shows

=== Interior (Post-Renovation) ===
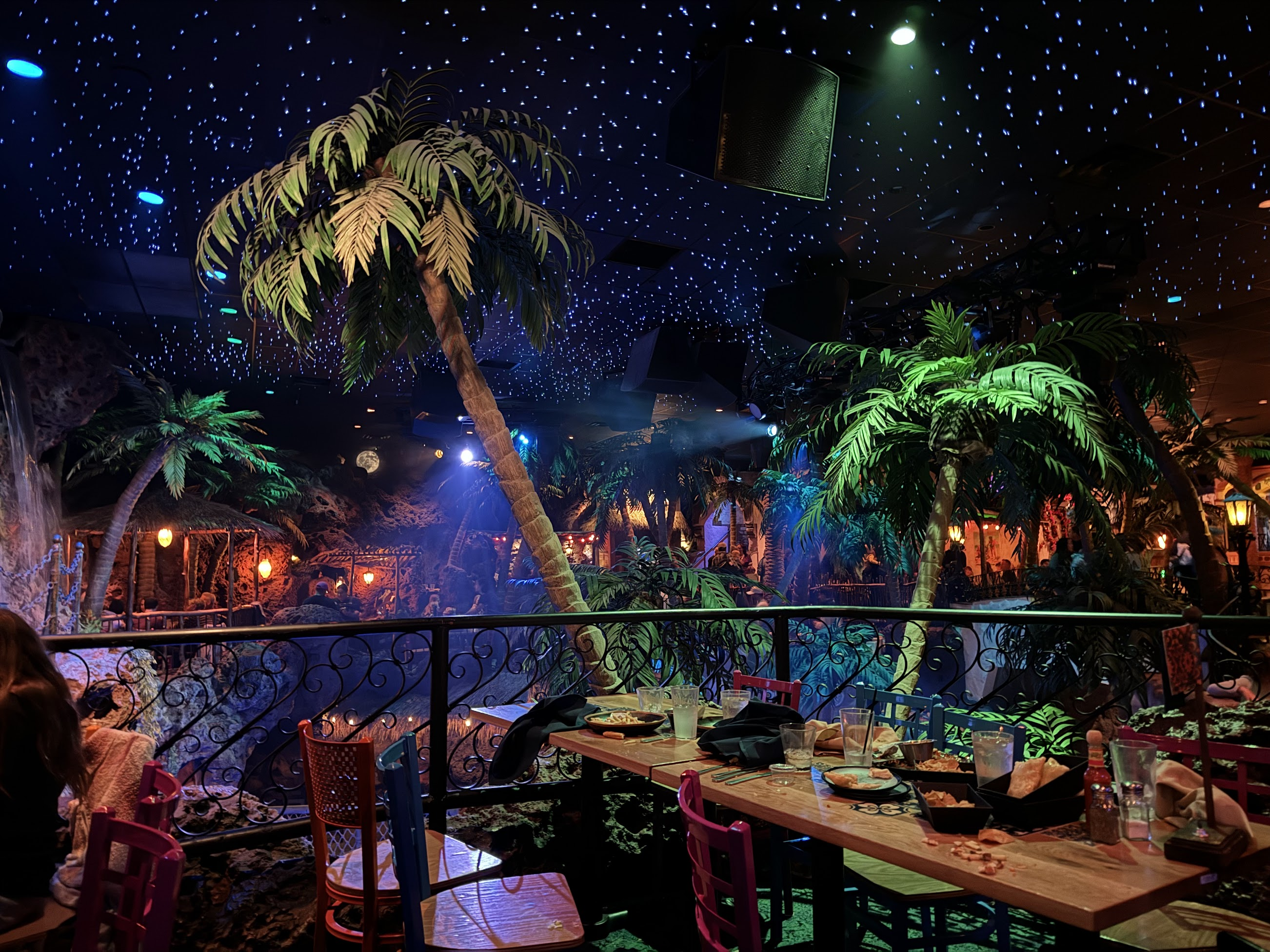
Premium Dining Area

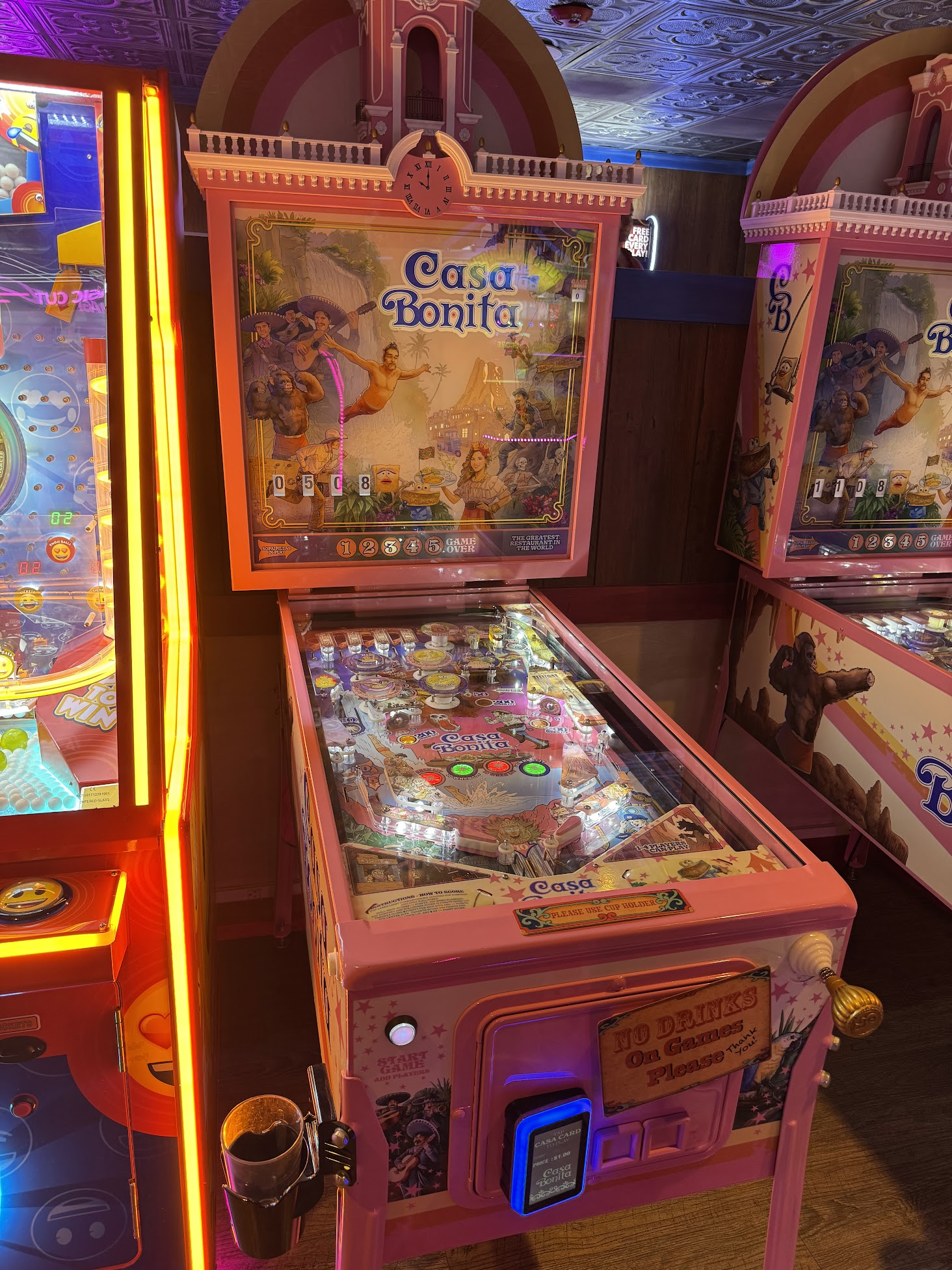
Pinball Machine

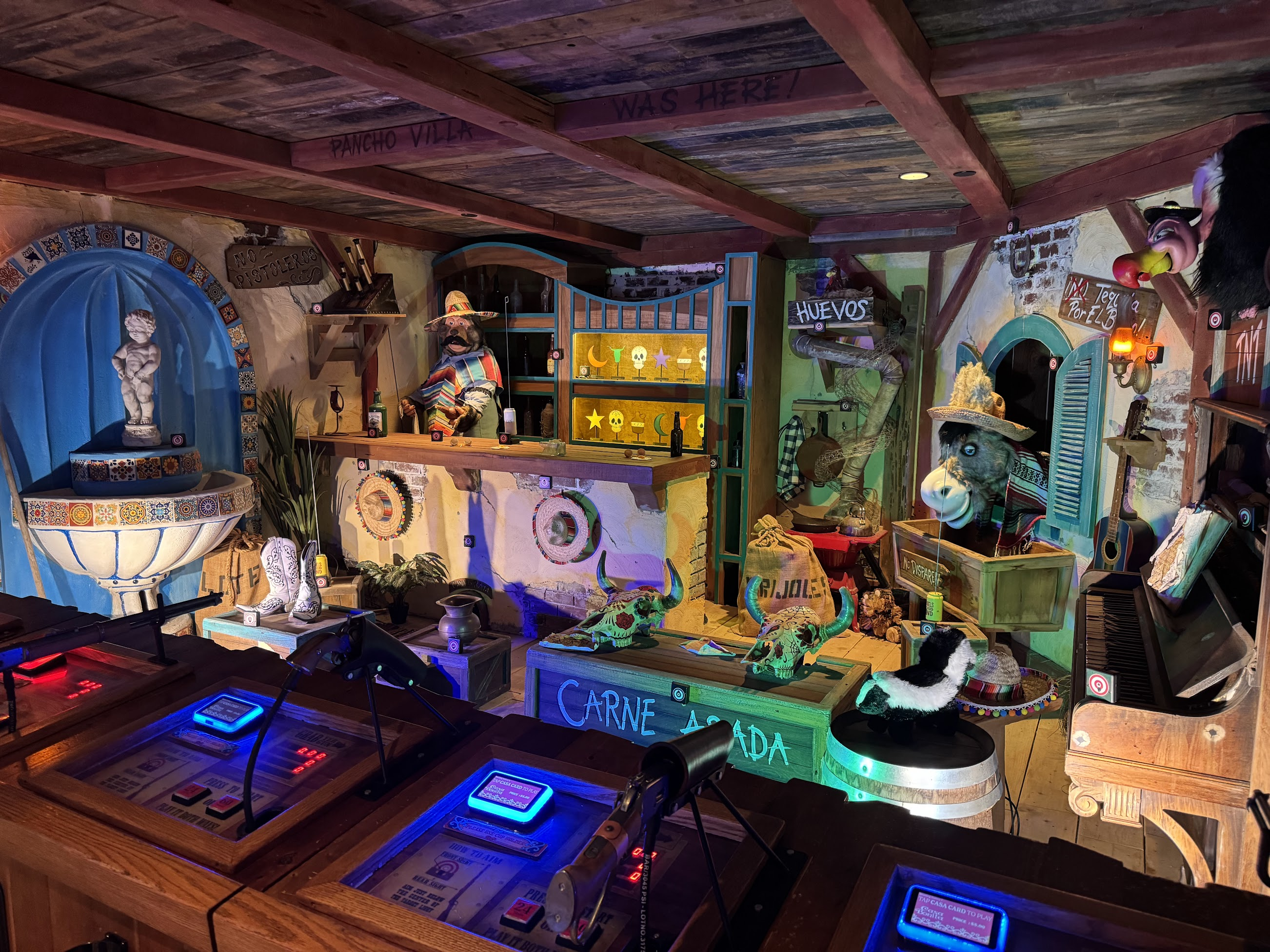
Shooting Gallery

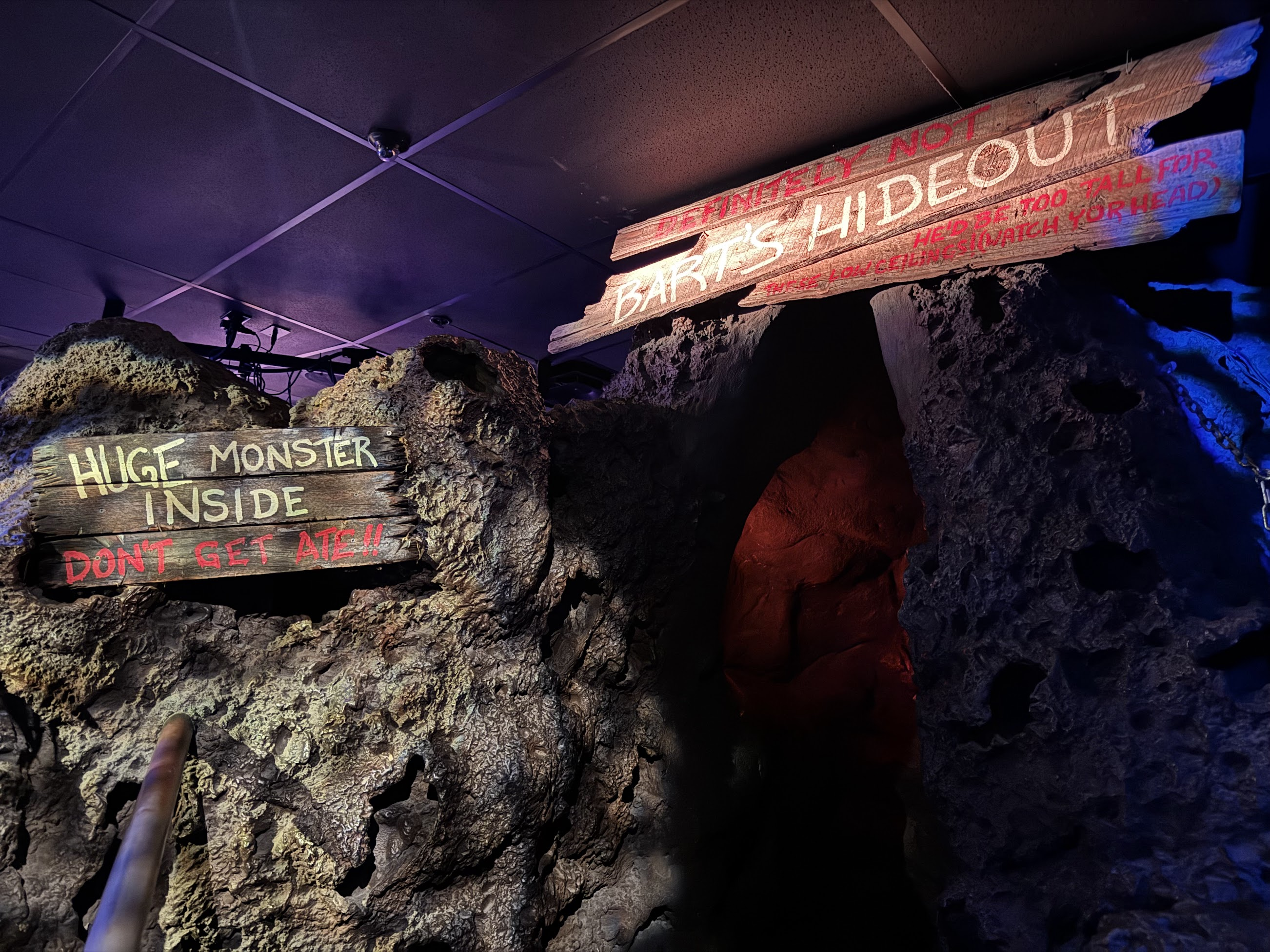
Entrance to Black Bart's Cave

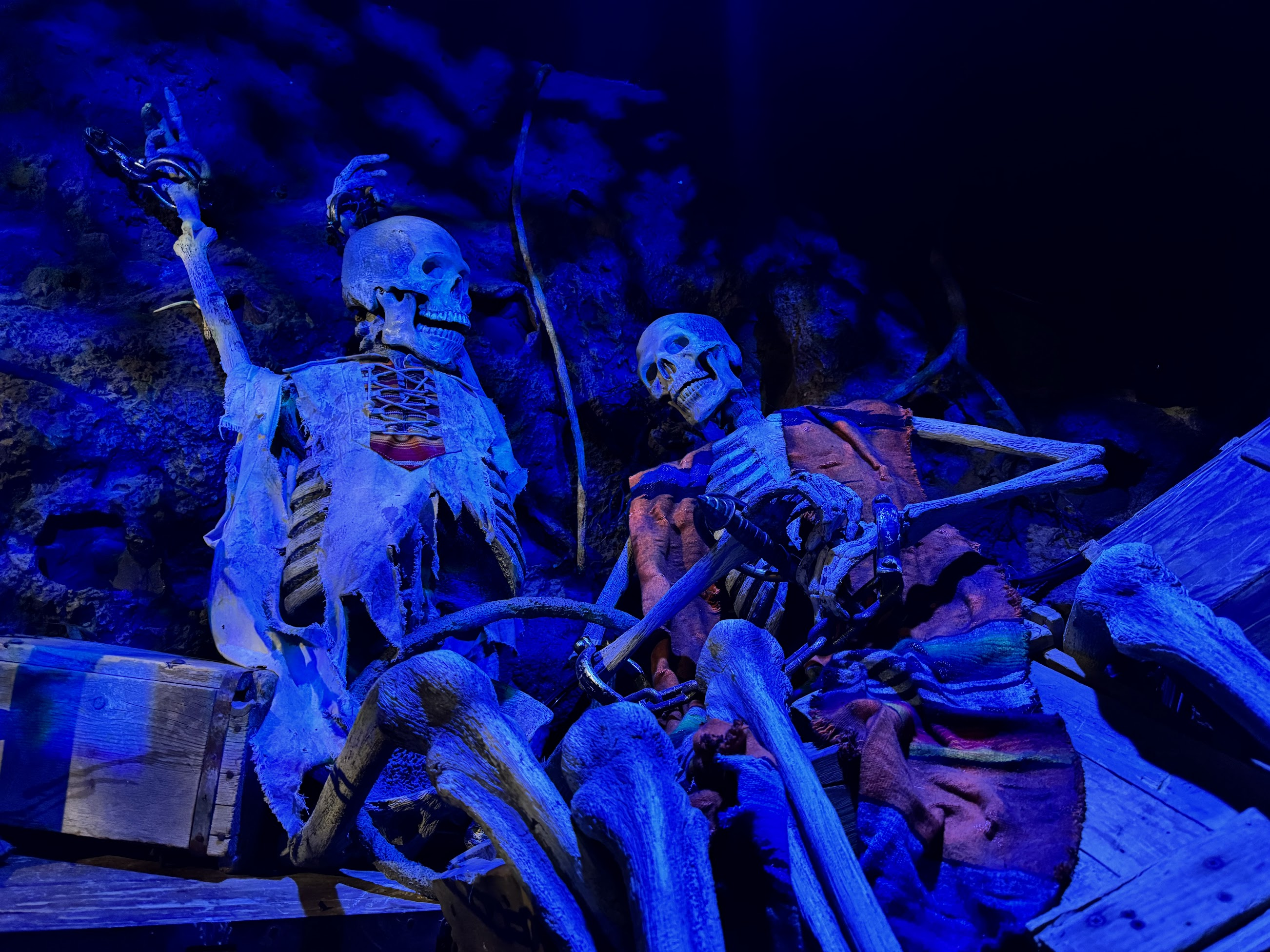
Skeletons at Black Bart's Cave

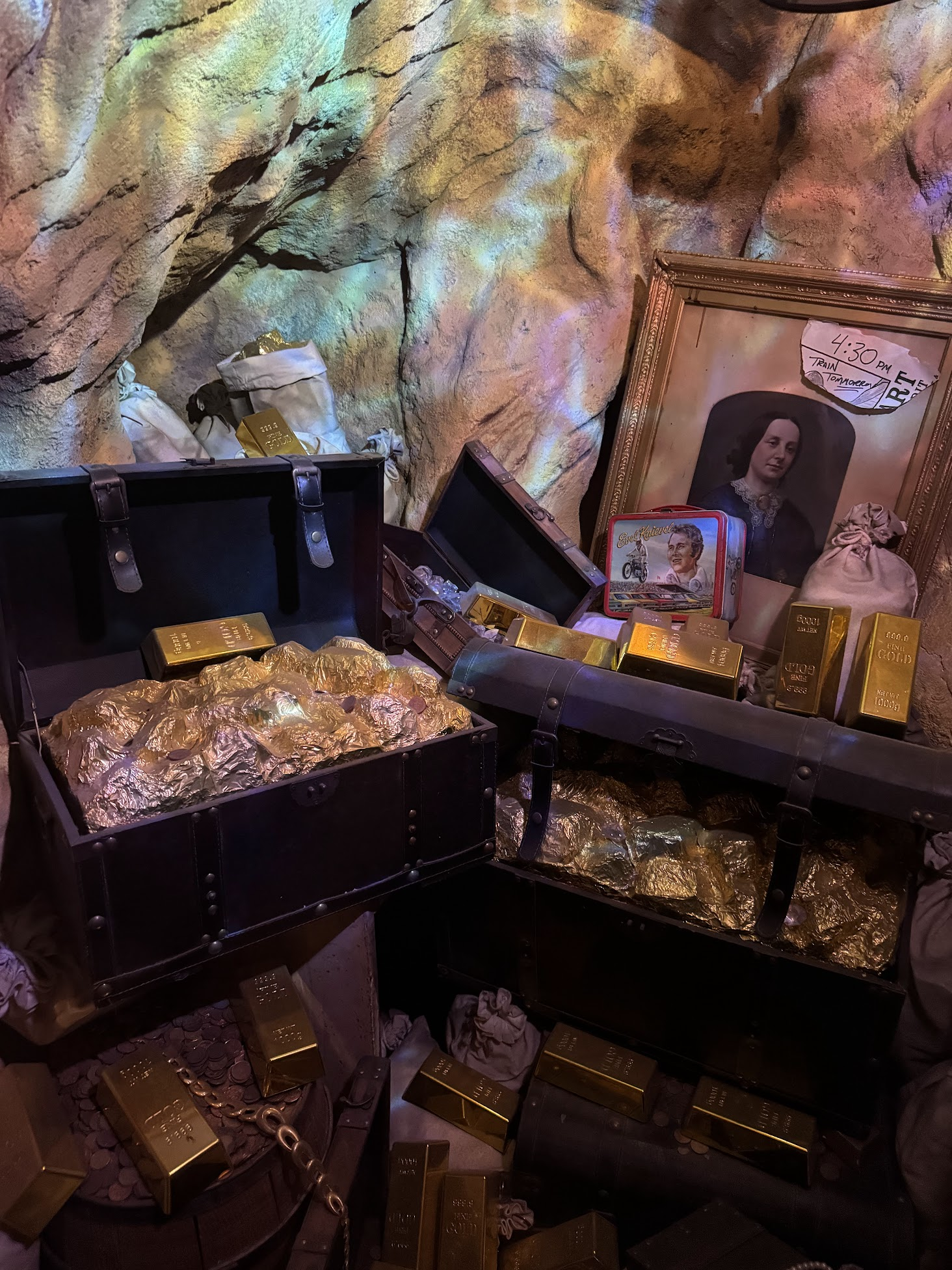
Black Bart's Treasure

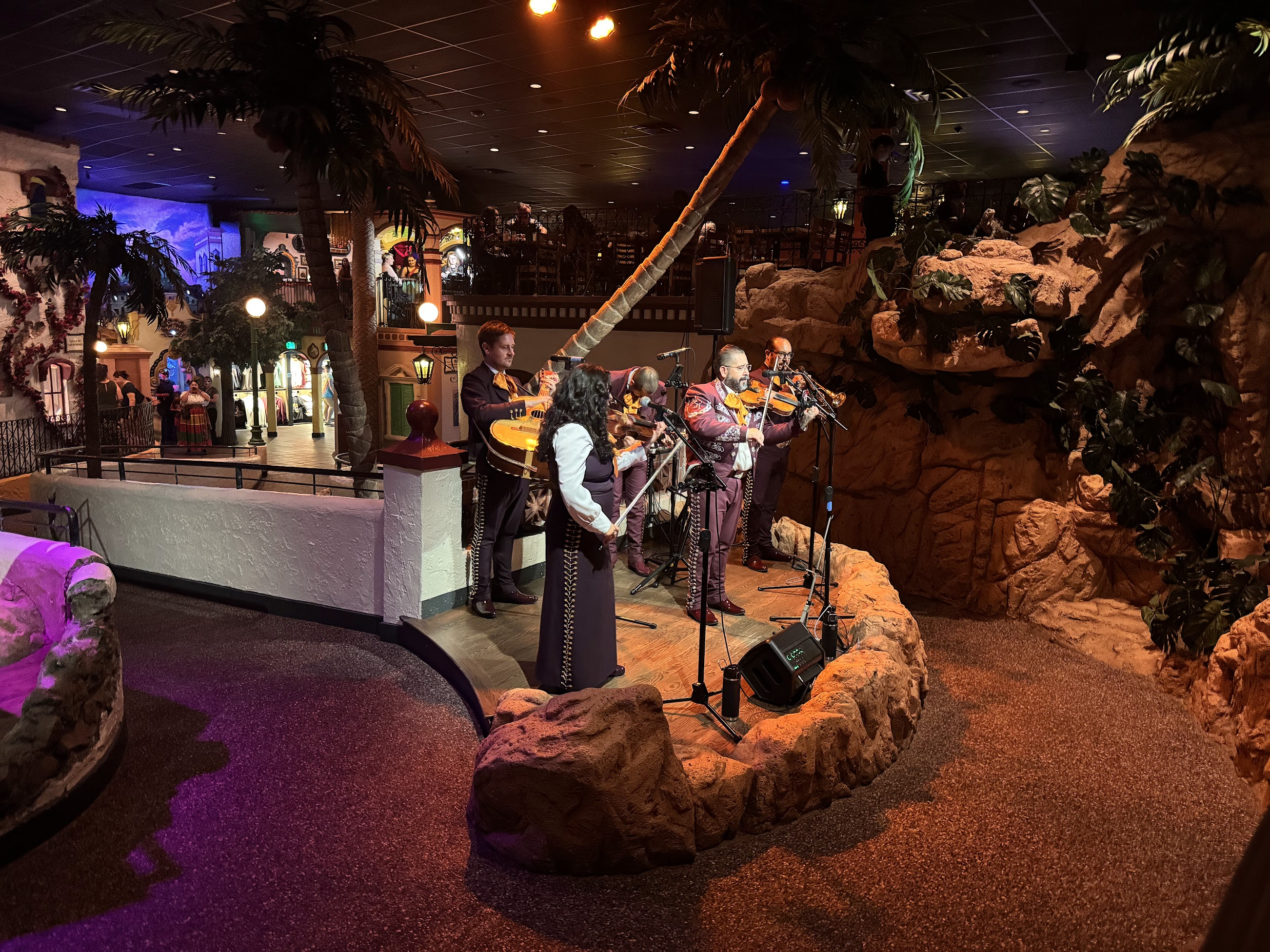
Mariachi Band

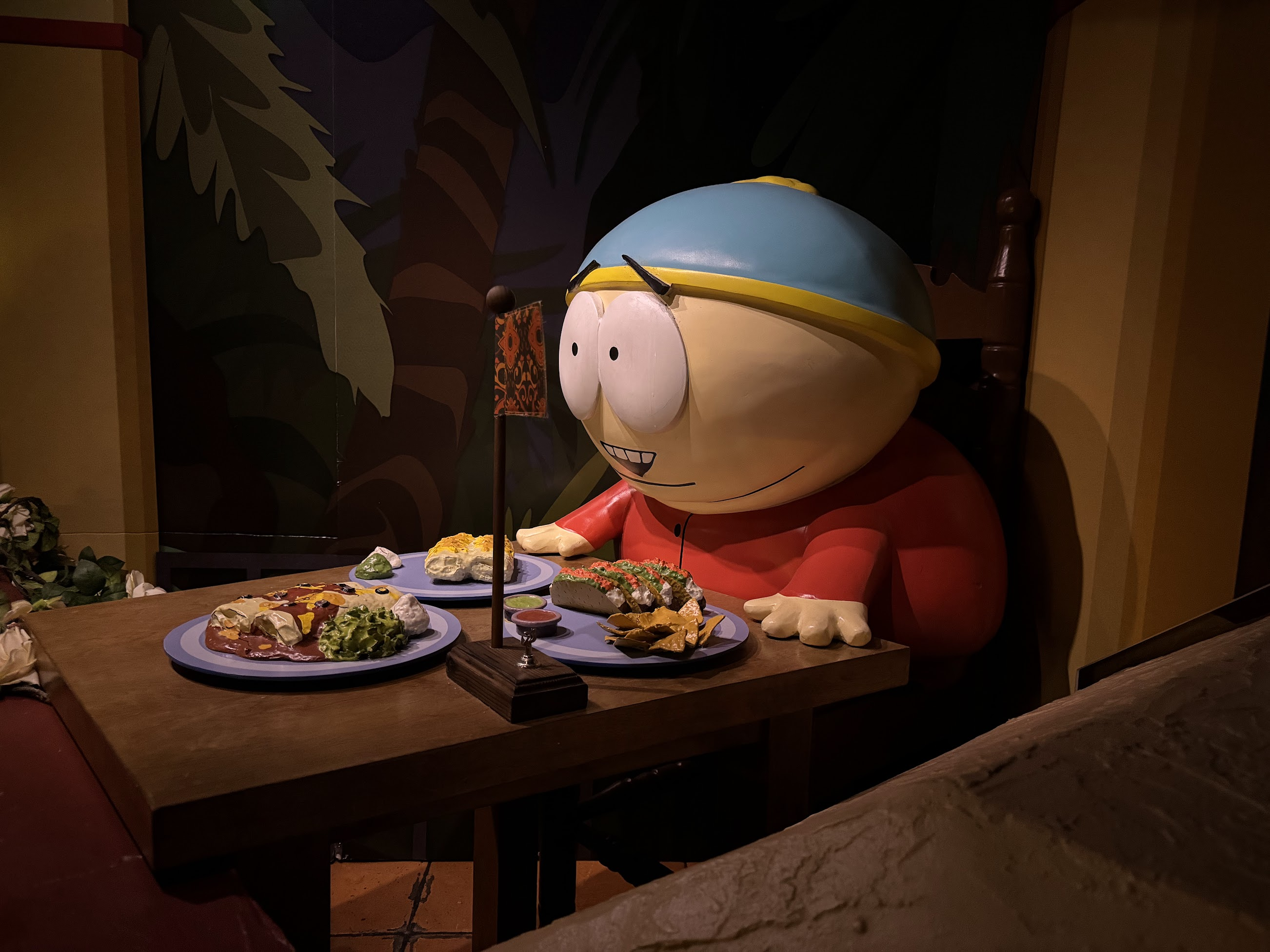
Cartman's Table
