= Hoveround =

Motorized wheelchair manufacturer

Hoveround Corporation
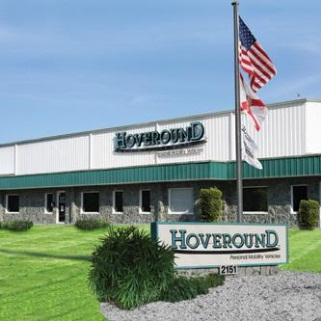
- Hoveround Corporate Offices
- Company type: Private
- Industry: Power wheelchair manufacturer in the durable medical equipment and home medical equipment industry
- Founded: April 1992
- Founder: Thomas E Kruse
- Headquarters: Sarasota, Florida, U.S.A.
- Products: Power Chairs, Mobility Scooters, Patient Lifts, Personal Vehicle Ramps, Mobility Accessories
- Revenue: $100 million (2005)
- Website: hoveround.com

Hoveround is an American corporation that manufactures and distributes the Hoveround brand of power wheelchairs (also known as motorized wheelchairs) and sells scooters, lifts, ramps and power chair accessories.

The company, founded in 1992 by former nurse and inventor Tom Kruse, is based in Sarasota, Florida. Its battery-operated products are primarily designed to assist mobility challenged individuals in getting around inside their homes and to facilitate mobility-related activities of daily living (MRADLs).

Hoveround sells directly to consumers and relies primarily on television, mail and their website for sales efforts.

In 2012, the company celebrated its 20th anniversary and had more than 500 employees.

In early 2014, Hoveround laid off 20 or more workers at its Sarasota County headquarters offices. The worker reduction brought the total number of employees in the region within a range of only 290 to 295. According to spokespeople, competitive bidding at Medicare and the need for the company to trim payroll prompted the lay offs of staffers from throughout the organization.

In late 2015, the Office of the Inspector General called for Hoveround to return $27 million to the government for power mobility devices that it said did not meet Medicare reimbursement requirements.

== Background ==
Inventor Thomas Kruse, along with his brothers George and Robert and his stepfather Gerald Ewing, founded Hoveround Corporation in April 1992. Built to increase the mobility of wheelchair users, the Hoveround prototype maximized ease-of-operation, comfort and durability.

The name “Hoveround” is the brainchild of Tom Kruse. He blended the word “hover” (based on the hovering look of the wheelchair), with the Beach Boys’ song “I Get Around”. Kruse had been listening to the song on the radio while driving to a power chair promotional event and came up with the Hoveround name.

On June 28, 1994, Hoveround began selling its power wheelchairs direct to the customer. Within 90 days, Hoveround was profitable.

Hoveround achieved FDA certification as a registered manufacturer in 1994, followed by ISO 9001 certification in 1997. In 1998, private holding company Jordan Industries purchased an 80% stake in Hoveround. The remaining stock remained with Kruse and his brothers.

== Manufacturing ==
Hoveround custom assembles all of its power chairs at the company's manufacturing facilities in Southwest Florida.

== Products ==
Hoveround sells power wheelchairs, motorized scooters, personal lifts, ramps and various power wheelchair accessories
