= List of South Park home video releases =

South Park was first released on home video in the United States on DVD and VHS by Rhino Home Video (subsidiary of Warner Music Group) in 1998, but these releases soon went out of print. They were then released in Europe starting in the year 2000. They were later re-released in the United States, starting in 2002. Paramount Home Entertainment (a sister company to Comedy Central) began releasing the seasons in Australia in October 2007.

Each of the box sets for the first 16 seasons has three discs, reduced to two discs starting with season 17. This article contains information on these season sets. In addition, a variety of compilations and special discs have also been produced, which are also detailed here.

== Seasons ==
Season	Episodes	DVD/Blu-ray release dates				
Season	Episodes	Region 1	Region 2	Region 4	DVD Discs	Blu-ray Discs
1	13	November 12, 2002 (DVD); December 5, 2017 (Blu-ray)	May 7, 2001 (DVD)	October 4, 2007 (DVD)	3	2
2	18	June 3, 2003 (DVD); December 5, 2017 (Blu-ray)	May 28, 2001 (DVD)	October 4, 2007 (DVD)	3	2
3	17	December 16, 2003 (DVD); December 5, 2017 (Blu-ray)	June 18, 2001 (DVD)	March 20, 2008 (DVD)	3	2
4	17	June 29, 2004 (DVD); December 5, 2017 (Blu-ray)	April 16, 2001 (DVD)	March 20, 2008 (DVD)	3	2
5	14	February 22, 2005 (DVD); December 5, 2017 (Blu-ray)	October 22, 2007 (DVD)	March 5, 2009 (DVD)	3	2
6	17	October 11, 2005 (DVD); December 19, 2017 (Blu-ray)	March 17, 2008 (DVD)	May 7, 2009 (DVD)	3	2
7	15	March 21, 2006 (DVD); December 19, 2017 (Blu-ray)	June 16, 2008 (DVD)	March 4, 2010 (DVD)	3	2
8	14	August 29, 2006 (DVD); December 19, 2017 (Blu-ray)	September 15, 2008 (DVD)	April 1, 2010 (DVD)	3	2
9	14	March 6, 2007 (DVD); December 19, 2017 (Blu-ray)	February 2, 2009 (DVD)	May 6, 2010 (DVD)	3	2
10	14	August 21, 2007 (DVD); December 19, 2017 (Blu-ray)	April 6, 2009 (DVD)	October 4, 2007 (DVD)	3	2
11	14	August 12, 2008 (DVD); December 19, 2017 (Blu-ray)	June 22, 2009 (DVD)	October 9, 2008 (DVD)	3	2
12	14	March 10, 2009	October 19, 2009	September 30, 2009	3	3
13	14	March 16, 2010	September 27, 2010	October 5, 2010	3	2
14	14	April 26, 2011	September 19, 2011	August 6, 2012	3	2
15	14	March 27, 2012	July 2, 2012	July 18, 2012	3	2
16	14	September 24, 2013	October 28, 2013	September 18, 2013	3	2
17	10	September 16, 2014	October 27, 2014	September 16, 2014	2	2
18	10	October 6, 2015	November 2, 2015	November 12, 2015	2	2
19	10	September 6, 2016	November 7, 2016	November 2, 2016	2	2
20	10	June 13, 2017	November 6, 2017	November 1, 2017	2	2
21	10	June 5, 2018	September 17, 2018	October 31, 2018	2	2
22	10	May 28, 2019	September 16, 2019	July 10, 2019	2	2
23	10	June 23, 2020	July 27, 2020	July 15, 2020	2	2
24	2	August 16, 2022	October 31, 2022	December 7, 2022	1	1
Post Covid & The Return of Covid	2	December 6, 2022	February 13, 2023	February 15, 2023	1	1
25	6	April 4, 2023	May 1, 2023	July 5, 2023	1	1
26	6	November 7, 2023	November 6, 2023	November 29, 2023	1	1
The Streaming Wars Parts 1 & 2	2	November 7, 2023	November 6, 2023	November 6, 2023	1	1
Joining the Panderverse	1	June 11, 2024	June 10, 2024	January 15, 2025	1	1
(Not Suitable for Children)	1	November 5, 2024	October 28, 2024	April 2, 2025	1	1
The End of Obesity	1	December 3, 2024	December 2, 2024	June 4, 2025	1	1
27 & 28	10	October 20, 2026	October 19, 2026	October 28, 2026	2	-

=== Season 1 ===
- Release Dates: November 12, 2002 (United States), 7 May 2001 (Europe), May 13, 2003 (Canada) [Rated 14A], June 29, 2004 (UK and United States Re-Release), October 4, 2007 (Australia), October 22, 2007 (UK – Re-Release), November 21, 2017 (United States – Blu-ray Disc)
- Special Features: Episode introductions from Trey Parker and Matt Stone, "O Holy Night" and "O Little Town Of Bethlehem" music videos, "A South Park Thanksgiving" charity sketch, original television promos, and special material recorded at the CableACE awards.
- Other Information: Full-Length commentaries were recorded for the set, but were declined because the creators believed they were of poor quality. However, for a short period of time, they were available through a mail-order offer. The commentaries are also available to download from Trey Parker's official website. Early editions of the set list the episodes in a different order to how they appear on the DVDs, which was fixed on later manufacturing runs. It is also the only set to not reference any specific episodes from the season in its cover artwork.

Disc 1 BBFC/IFCO/OFLC/NZ RATING:15/15/M/M

- "Cartman Gets an Anal Probe" Original air date: August 13, 1997
- "Weight Gain 4000" Original air date: August 20, 1997
- "Volcano" Original air date: August 27, 1997
- "Big Gay Al's Big Gay Boat Ride" Original air date: September 3, 1997

Disc 2 BBFC/IFCO/OFLC/NZ RATING:15/15/M/M

- "An Elephant Makes Love to a Pig" Original air date: September 10, 1997
- "Death" Original air date: September 17, 1997
- "Pinkeye" Original air date: October 29, 1997
- "Starvin' Marvin" Original air date: November 19, 1997

Disc 3 BBFC/IFCO/OFLC/NZ RATING:15/15/M/M

- "Mr. Hankey, the Christmas Poo" Original air date: December 17, 1997
- "Damien" Original air date: February 4, 1998
- "Tom's Rhinoplasty" Original air date: February 11, 1998
- "Mecha-Streisand" Original air date: February 18, 1998
- "Cartman's Mom Is a Dirty Slut" Original air date: February 25, 1998

=== Season 2 ===
- Release Dates: 16 April 2001 (Europe), June 3, 2003 (United States), June 29, 2004 (UK and United States Re-Release), October 4, 2007 (Australia), 22 October 2007 (UK – Re-Release), November 21, 2017 (United States – Blu-ray Disc)
- Special Features: Episode introductions from Trey Parker and Matt Stone, television promos, "Goin' Down To South Park" documentary and a music video, "Chocolate Salty Balls".
- Other Information: During the recording of the commentary for Season 3, the creators announced that they found most of the episodes in Season 2 to be poor, in retrospect. This is the only season of South Park where no commentaries are known to have been recorded. A special offer, giving away a copy of the original cut of "Cartman Gets an Anal Probe" alongside the set, was available by pre-ordering the set at Best Buy. The front cover includes an image of Cartman dressed as a policeman from the episode "Chickenlover". in the UK this marks the first South Park related DVD to be given a 12 rating by the BBFC. Disc 3 is rated 12 while Disc 1 and 2 are rated 15. so far afterwards anything South Park related is rated 15, until Season 7 when it gets an 18 rating due to the audio commentaries (the episodes are only rated 15).

Disc 1 BBFC/IFCO/OFLC/NZ RATING:15/15/M/M

- "Terrance and Phillip in Not Without My Anus" Original air date: April 1, 1998
- "Cartman's Mom Is Still a Dirty Slut" Original air date: April 22, 1998
- "Chickenlover" Original air date: May 20, 1998
- "Ike's Wee Wee" Original air date: May 27, 1998
- "Conjoined Fetus Lady" Original air date: June 3, 1998
- "The Mexican Staring Frog of Southern Sri Lanka" Original air date: June 10, 1998

Disc 2 BBFC/IFCO/OFLC/NZ RATING:15/15/M/M

- "Flashbacks" Original air date: June 17, 1998
- "Summer Sucks" Original air date: June 24, 1998
- "Chef's Salty Chocolate Balls" Original air date: August 19, 1998
- "Chickenpox" Original air date: August 26, 1998
- "Roger Ebert Should Lay Off the Fatty Foods" Original air date: September 2, 1998
- "Clubhouses" Original air date: September 23, 1998

Disc 3 BBFC/IFCO/OFLC/NZ RATING:12/15/M/M

- "Cow Days" Original air date: September 30, 1998
- "Chef Aid" Original air date: October 7, 1998
- "Spookyfish" Original air date: October 28, 1998
- "Merry Christmas Charlie Manson!" Original air date: December 9, 1998
- "Gnomes" Original air date: December 16, 1998
- "Prehistoric Ice Man" Original air date: January 20, 1999

=== Season 3 ===
- Release Dates: June 18, 2001 (Europe), December 16, 2003 (United States), June 29, 2004 (UK), 17 March 2008 (UK – Re-Release), 20 March 2008 (Australia), November 21, 2017 (United States – Blu-ray Disc)
- Special Features: DVD Previews, Mini-Commentaries from the creators, which last around four-five minutes each.
- Other Information: The set was originally rated 18 in the UK, Canada and Ireland, due to the content of the final episode, World Wide Recorder Concert (which contains references to child molestation). It was re-rated 15 in the UK upon its re-release in 2008, although in Ireland it is still rated 18. It also remains un-rated in the United States. Also the first season to receive an MA15+ by Australia for "Strong Sexual References and Crude Humor". The picture on the front of the box is taken from the episode "Chinpokomon".

Disc 1 BBFC/IFCO/OFLC/NZ RATING:15/15/MA15/M

- "Rainforest Shmainforest" Original air date: April 7, 1999
- "Spontaneous Combustion" Original air date: April 14, 1999
- "The Succubus" Original air date: April 21, 1999
- "Jakovasaurs" Original air date: June 16, 1999
- "Tweek vs. Craig" Original air date: June 23, 1999
- "Sexual Harassment Panda" Original air date: July 7, 1999

Disc 2 BBFC/IFCO/OFLC/NZ RATING:15/15/MA15/M

- "Cat Orgy" Original air date: July 14, 1999
- "Two Guys Naked in a Hot Tub" Original air date: July 21, 1999
- "Jewbilee" Original air date: July 28, 1999
- "Korn's Groovy Pirate Ghost Mystery" Original air date: October 27, 1999
- "Chinpokomon" Original air date: November 3, 1999
- "Hooked on Monkey Fonics" Original air date: November 10, 1999

Disc 3 BBFC/IFCO/OFLC/NZ RATING:15/18/MA15/M

- "Starvin' Marvin in Space" Original air date: November 17, 1999
- "The Red Badge of Gayness" Original air date: November 24, 1999
- "Mr. Hankey's Christmas Classics" Original air date: December 1, 1999
- "Are You There God? It's Me, Jesus" Original air date: December 29, 1999
- "World Wide Recorder Concert" Original air date: January 12, 2000

=== Season 4 ===
- Release Dates: June 29, 2004 (UK and United States), 2 March 2008 (Australia), 17 March 2008 (UK – Re-Release), November 21, 2017 (United States – Blu-ray Disc)
- Special Features: Mini-Commentaries, Comedy Central Quickies
- Other Information: The Set was rated 14A in Canada and is the first season to be rated R13 in New Zealand. The picture on the cover is from the episode "Something You Can Do With Your Finger". It is the first (and only) season to feature the boys not wearing their normal clothes.

Disc 1 BBFC/IFCO/OFLC/NZ RATING:15/15/MA15/R13

- "The Tooth Fairy Tats 2000" Original air date: April 5, 2000
- "Cartman's Silly Hate Crime 2000" Original air date: April 12, 2000
- "Timmy 2000" Original air date: April 19, 2000
- "Quintuplets 2000" Original air date: April 26, 2000
- "Cartman Joins NAMBLA" Original air date: June 21, 2000
- "Cherokee Hair Tampons" Original air date: June 28, 2000

Disc 2 BBFC/IFCO/OFLC/NZ RATING:15/18/MA15/R13

- "Chef Goes Nanners" Original air date: July 5, 2000
- "Something You Can Do with Your Finger" Original air date: July 12, 2000
- "Do the Handicapped Go to Hell?" Original air date: July 19, 2000
- "Probably" Original air date: July 26, 2000
- "4th Grade" Original air date: November 8, 2000
- "Trapper Keeper" Original air date: November 15, 2000

Disc 3 BBFC/IFCO/OFLC/NZ RATING:15/18/MA15/R13

- "Helen Keller! The Musical" Original air date: November 22, 2000
- "Pip" Original air date: November 29, 2000
- "Fat Camp" Original air date: December 6, 2000
- "The Wacky Molestation Adventure" Original air date: December 13, 2000
- "A Very Crappy Christmas" Original air date: December 20, 2000

=== Season 5 ===
- Release Dates: February 22, 2005 (United States), October 22, 2007 (UK), March 5, 2009 (Australia), November 21, 2017 (United States – Blu-ray Disc)
- Special Features: DVD Previews, Mini-Commentaries, Comedy Central Quickies
- Other Information: The Set was rated a 14A in Canada. While not specified, it can be assumed that the picture on the front of the cover is meant to be from the episode "Cripple Fight".

Disc 1 BBFC/IFCO/OFLC/NZ RATING:15/15/MA15/R16

- "It Hits The Fan" Original air date: June 20, 2001
- "Cripple Fight" Original air date: June 27, 2001
- "Super Best Friends" Original air date: July 4, 2001
- "Scott Tenorman Must Die" Original air date: July 11, 2001
- "Terrance and Phillip: Behind The Blow" Original air date: July 18, 2001

Disc 2 BBFC/IFCO/OFLC/NZ RATING:15/15/MA15/R16

- "Cartmanland" Original air date: July 25, 2001
- "Proper Condom Use" Original air date: August 1, 2001
- "Towelie" Original air date: August 8, 2001
- "Osama Bin Laden Has Farty Pants" Original air date: November 7, 2001
- "How to Eat with Your Butt" Original air date: November 14, 2001

Disc 3 BBFC/IFCO/OFLC/NZ RATING:15/15/MA15/R16

- "The Entity" Original air date: November 21, 2001
- "Here Comes the Neighborhood" Original air date: November 28, 2001
- "Kenny Dies" Original air date: December 5, 2001
- "Butters' Very Own Episode" Original air date: December 12, 2001

=== Season 6 ===
- Release Dates: October 11, 2005 (United States), March 17, 2008 (UK), May 7, 2009 (Australia), December 19, 2017 (United States – Blu-ray Disc)
- Special Features: Mini-Commentaries, Comedy Central Quickies, DVD Previews
- Other Information: Like the previous season, it is not obvious which episode is meant to be represented on the front of the box but it is probably "Professor Chaos" due to the style in which the number of the season is written and the look on Butter's face.

Disc 1 BBFC/IFCO/OFLC/NZ RATING:15/18/MA15/R13

- "Jared Has Aides" Original air date: March 6, 2002
- "Asspen" Original air date: March 13, 2002
- "Freak Strike" Original air date: March 20, 2002
- "Fun With Veal" Original air date: March 27, 2002
- "The New Terrance and Phillip Movie Trailer" Original air date: April 3, 2002
- "Professor Chaos" Original air date: April 10, 2002

Disc 2 BBFC/IFCO/OFLC/NZ RATING:15/18/MA15/R16

- "Simpsons Already Did It" Original air date: June 26, 2002
- "Red Hot Catholic Love" Original air date: July 3, 2002
- "Free Hat" Original air date: July 10, 2002
- "Bebe's Boobs Destroy Society" Original air date: July 17, 2002
- "Child Abduction Is Not Funny" Original air date: July 24, 2002

Disc 3 BBFC/IFCO/OFLC/NZ RATING:15/15/MA15/R16

- "A Ladder To Heaven" Original air date: November 6, 2002
- "The Return of the Lord of the Rings to the Two Towers" Original air date: November 13, 2002
- "The Death Camp of Tolerance" Original air date: November 20, 2002
- "The Biggest Douche In The Universe" Original air date: November 27, 2002
- "My Future Self n' Me" Original air date: December 4, 2002
- "Red Sleigh Down" Original air date: December 11, 2002

=== Season 7 ===
- Release Dates: March 21, 2006 (United States), June 16, 2008 (UK), March 4, 2010 (Australia), December 19, 2017 (United States – Blu-ray Disc)
- Special Features: Mini-Commentaries, Comedy Central Quickies, DVD Previews
- Other Information: Season 7 is one of the 3 seasons to be released in the UK to be rated an 18 by the BBFC, the others being season 20 and season 22. This was due to use of the word "cunt" in the commentary for the episode "Raisins". The episodes themselves are only a 15.The basic design of the packaging changes, beginning with this season. All the graffiti on the cover is presumably a reference to the episode "Krazy Kripples". The box itself is the first not to feature Cartman, and the first to feature other characters (Jimmy and Timmy). It is the only set to be released in Digipak form, with a hole in the front of the box to allow the buyer to see Stan, Kyle and Kenny. Previously, each of the discs in each set portrayed one specific character – however, each disc from Season 7 shows a different character.

Disc 1 BBFC/IFCO/OFLC/NZ RATING:15/18/MA15/R16

- "Cancelled" Original air date: March 19, 2003
- "Krazy Kripples" Original air date: March 26, 2003
- "Toilet Paper" Original air date: April 2, 2003
- "I'm A Little Bit Country" Original air date: April 9, 2003
- "Fat Butt and Pancake Head" Original air date: April 16, 2003

Disc 2 BBFC/IFCO/OFLC/NZ RATING:15/15/MA15/R16

- "Lil' Crime Stoppers" Original air date: April 23, 2003
- "Red Man's Greed" Original air date: April 30, 2003
- "South Park Is Gay!" Original air date: October 22, 2003
- "Christian Rock Hard" Original air date: October 29, 2003
- "Grey Dawn" Original air date: November 5, 2003

Disc 3 BBFC/IFCO/OFLC/NZ RATING:18/15/MA15/R13

- "Casa Bonita" Original air date: November 12, 2003
- "All About the Mormons?" Original air date: November 19, 2003
- "Butt Out" Original air date: December 3, 2003
- "Raisins" Original air date: December 10, 2003
- "It's Christmas in Canada" Original air date: December 17, 2003

=== Season 8 ===
- Release Dates: August 29, 2006 (United States), September 15, 2008 (UK), December 19, 2017 (United States – Blu-ray Disc)
- Special Features: Mini-Commentaries, Comedy Central Quickies, DVD Previews
- Other Information: The theme of different characters on each disc continues with this season – with each disc showing a picture that is relevant to the episodes on it. The box shows Cartman, Stan, Kyle and Kenny dressed up as Ninjas, from episode 1, Good Times With Weapons.

Disc 1 BBFC/IFCO/OFLC/NZ RATING:15/15/MA15/R16

- "Good Times with Weapons" Original air date: March 17, 2004
- "Up the Down Steroid" Original air date: March 24, 2004
- "The Passion of the Jew" Original air date: March 31, 2004
- "You Got F'd in the A" Original air date: April 7, 2004
- "AWESOM-O" Original air date: April 14, 2004

Disc 2 BBFC/IFCO/OFLC/NZ RATING:15/15/MA15/R16

- "The Jeffersons" Original air date: April 21, 2004
- "Goobacks" Original air date: April 28, 2004
- "Douche and Turd" Original air date: October 27, 2004
- "Something Wal-Mart This Way Comes" Original air date: November 3, 2004
- "Preschool" Original air date: November 10, 2004

Disc 3 BBFC/IFCO/OFLC/NZ RATING:15/15/MA15/R16

- "Quest for Ratings" Original air date: November 17, 2004
- "Stupid Spoiled Whore Video Playset" Original air date: December 1, 2004
- "Cartman's Incredible Gift" Original air date: December 8, 2004
- "Woodland Critter Christmas" Original air date: December 15, 2004

=== Season 9 ===
- Release Dates: March 6, 2007 (United States), January 28, 2009 (UK and Europe), May 6, 2010 (Australia), December 19, 2017 (United States – Blu-ray Disc)
- Special Features: Mini-Commentaries, Comedy Central Quickies, DVD Previews
- Other Information: Season 9 is the first season to have 'Violence' written as part of the BBFC warning. The set was rated a 15 in the UK and Ireland, and 18A in Canada. The picture on the box is from the Emmy award-winning "Best Friends Forever" and the controversial episode "Trapped In The Closet".

Disc 1 BBFC/IFCO/OFLC/NZ RATING:15/15/MA15/R16

- "Mr. Garrison's Fancy New Vagina" Original air date: March 9, 2005
- "Die Hippie, Die" Original air date: March 16, 2005
- "Wing" Original air date: March 23, 2005
- "Best Friends Forever" Original air date: March 30, 2005
- "The Losing Edge" Original air date: April 6, 2005

Disc 2 BBFC/IFCO/OFLC/NZ RATING:15/15/MA15/R16

- "The Death of Eric Cartman" Original air date: April 13, 2005
- "Erection Day" Original air date: April 20, 2005
- "Two Days Before the Day After Tomorrow" Original air date: October 19, 2005
- "Marjorine" Original air date: October 26, 2005
- "Follow that Egg!" Original air date: November 2, 2005

Disc 3 BBFC/IFCO/OFLC/NZ RATING:15/15/MA15/R16

- "Ginger Kids" Original air date: November 9, 2005
- "Trapped in the Closet" Original air date: November 16, 2005
- "Free Willzyx" Original air date: November 30, 2005
- "Bloody Mary" Original air date: December 7, 2005

=== Season 10 ===
- Release Dates: August 21, 2007 (United States), April 6, 2009 (UK), October 4, 2009 (Australia), December 19, 2017 (United States – Blu-ray Disc)
- Special Features: Mini-Commentaries, Comedy Central Quickies, DVD Previews
- Other Information: The Set contained a 14-Day trial for World of Warcraft, the game parodied in Episode 8. Target released a special edition of the set, with a lenticular cover and three exclusive postcards. The somewhat obscure cover picture is from the episode "Make Love, Not Warcraft"

Disc 1 BBFC/IFCO/OFLC/NZ RATING:15/18/MA15/R16

- "The Return of Chef" Original air date: March 22, 2006
- "Smug Alert!" Original air date: March 29, 2006
- "Cartoon Wars Part I" Original air date: April 5, 2006
- "Cartoon Wars Part II" Original air date: April 12, 2006
- "A Million Little Fibers" Original air date: April 19, 2006

Disc 2 BBFC/IFCO/OFLC/NZ RATING:15/15/MA15/R16

- "ManBearPig" Original air date: April 26, 2006
- "Tsst" Original air date: May 3, 2006
- "Make Love, Not Warcraft" Original air date: October 4, 2006
- "Mystery of the Urinal Deuce" Original air date: October 11, 2006
- "Miss Teacher Bangs a Boy" Original air date: October 18, 2006

Disc 3 BBFC/IFCO/OFLC/NZ RATING:15/15/MA15/R16

- "Hell on Earth 2006" Original air date: October 25, 2006
- "Go God Go" Original air date: November 1, 2006
- "Go God Go XII" Original air date: November 8, 2006
- "Stanley's Cup" Original air date: November 15, 2006

=== Season 11 ===
- Release Dates: August 12, 2008 (United States), October 9, 2008 (Australia), June 22, 2009 (UK), December 19, 2017 (United States – Blu-ray Disc)
- Special Features: Mini-Commentaries, Comedy Central Quickies, DVD Previews
- Other Information: Every episode is uncensored for the first time. At the time of the set first being advertised, it was rumoured it would be released with a three-song download pack for Rock Band, but this was later found to be incorrect. Target released a special edition of the set, with a lenticular cover and three exclusive postcards. The box art for the regular edition feature Stan and Kyle playing guitars from the episode "Guitar Queer-o". It is the only season to feature just two characters on the cover.

Disc 1 BBFC/IFCO/OFLC/NZ RATING:15/15/MA15/R16

- "With Apologies to Jesse Jackson" Original air date: March 7, 2007
- "Cartman Sucks" Original air date: March 14, 2007
- "Lice Capades" Original air date: March 21, 2007
- "The Snuke" Original air date: March 28, 2007
- "Fantastic Easter Special" Original air date: April 4, 2007

Disc 2 BBFC/IFCO/OFLC/NZ RATING:15/15/MA15/R16

- "D-Yikes!" Original air date: April 11, 2007
- "Night of the Living Homeless" Original air date: April 18, 2007
- "Le Petit Tourette" Original air date: October 3, 2007
- "More Crap" Original air date: October 10, 2007

Disc 3 BBFC/IFCO/OFLC/NZ RATING:15/15/MA15/R16

- "Imaginationland Episode I" Original air date: October 17, 2007
- "Imaginationland Episode II" Original air date: October 24, 2007
- "Imaginationland Episode III" Original air date: October 31, 2007
- "Guitar Queer-o" Original air date: November 7, 2007
- "The List" Original air date: November 14, 2007

=== Season 12 ===
- Release Dates: March 10, 2009 (United States), May 25, 2009 (UK – Blu-ray Disc), October 19, 2009 (UK – DVD), May 14, 2009 (Australia – Blu-ray Disc), October 1, 2009 (Australia – DVD)
- Special Features: Uncensored audio, Mini-Commentaries, "Six Days To South Park" Documentary, Behind The Scenes Of "Major Boobage" and "About Last Night"
- Other Information: The Set was released with a code to collect a Digital Copy of all fourteen episodes, available for download to an MP4 or iPod. The US edition also came with an exclusive preview booklet of "The South Park Guide To Life". The box art represents the third episode in the season: "Major Boobage".

Disc 1 BBFC/IFCO/OFLC/NZ RATING:15/15/MA15/R16

- "Tonsil Trouble" Original air date: March 12, 2008
- "Britney's New Look" Original air date: March 19, 2008
- "Major Boobage" Original air date: March 26, 2008
- "Canada on Strike" Original air date: April 2, 2008
- "Eek, a Penis!" Original air date: April 9, 2008

Disc 2 BBFC/IFCO/OFLC/NZ RATING:15/18/MA15/R16

- "Over Logging" Original air date: April 16, 2008
- "Super Fun Time" Original air date: April 23, 2008
- "The China Probrem" Original air date: October 8, 2008
- "Breast Cancer Show Ever" Original air date: October 15, 2008

Disc 3 BBFC/IFCO/OFLC/NZ RATING:15/18/MA15/R13

- "Pandemic" Original air date: October 22, 2008
- "Pandemic 2: The Startling" Original air date: October 29, 2008
- "About Last Night" Original air date: November 5, 2008
- "Elementary School Musical" Original air date: November 12, 2008
- "The Ungroundable" Original air date: November 19, 2008

=== Season 13 ===
- Release Dates: March 17, 2010 (United States), March 29, 2010 (UK – Blu-ray Disc), May 6, 2010 (Australia – Blu-ray Disc), September 27, 2010 (UK – Standard DVD), October 7, 2010 (Australia – Standard DVD)
- Special Features: Uncensored audio, Mini-Commentaries, A Behind The Scenes Tour Of South Park Studios, Deleted Scenes. While somewhat unclear, the cover art is from episode 7 of the season:"Fatbeard".

Disc 1 BBFC/IFCO/OFLC/NZ RATING:15/15/MA15/R16

- "The Ring" Original air date: March 11, 2009
- "The Coon" Original air date: March 18, 2009
- "Margaritaville" Original air date: March 25, 2009
- "Eat, Pray, Queef" Original air date: April 1, 2009
- "Fishsticks" Original air date: April 8, 2009

Disc 2 BBFC/IFCO/OFLC/NZ RATING:15/15/MA15/R16

- "Pinewood Derby" Original air date: April 15, 2009
- "Fatbeard" Original air date: April 22, 2009
- "Dead Celebrities" Original air date: October 7, 2009
- "Butters' Bottom Bitch" Original air date: October 14, 2009
- "W.T.F." Original air date: October 21, 2009

Disc 3 BBFC/IFCO/OFLC/NZ RATING:15/15/MA15/R16

- "Whale Whores" Original air date: October 28, 2009
- "The F Word" Original air date: November 4, 2009
- "Dances with Smurfs" Original air date: November 11, 2009
- "Pee" Original air date: November 18, 2009

=== Season 14 ===
- Release Dates: April 26, 2011 (United States), August 11, 2011 (Australia – Standard DVD)
- Special Features: Uncensored audio (with the exception of 201, which appears as it did when it originally aired on Comedy Central), Mini-Commentaries, Deleted Scenes, and the season thirteen episode "The Coon"
- The cover is based on the three-part saga "Coon 2: Hindsight", ""Mysterion Rises" and "Coon vs. Coon and Friends"
- The Region 2 & 4 releases of "South Park – The Complete Fourteenth Season" has had both "200" and "201" removed for undisclosed reasons, despite the packaging claiming that all fourteen episodes are included in the set.

Disc 1 BBFC/IFCO/OFLC/NZ RATING:15/15/MA15/R16

- "Sexual Healing" Original air date: March 17, 2010
- "The Tale of Scrotie McBoogerballs" Original air date: March 24, 2010
- "Medicinal Fried Chicken" Original air date: March 31, 2010
- "You Have 0 Friends" Original air date: April 7, 2010
- "200" Original air date: April 14, 2010

Disc 2 BBFC/IFCO/OFLC/NZ RATING:15/15/MA15/R16

- "201" Original air date: April 21, 2010
- "Crippled Summer" Original air date: April 28, 2010
- "Poor and Stupid" Original air date: October 6, 2010
- "It's a Jersey Thing" Original air date: October 13, 2010
- "Insheeption" Original air date: October 20, 2010

Disc 3 BBFC/IFCO/OFLC/NZ RATING:15/15/MA15/R16

- "Coon 2: Hindsight" Original air date: October 27, 2010
- "Mysterion Rises" Original air date: November 3, 2010
- "Coon vs. Coon and Friends" Original air date: November 10, 2010
- "Crème Fraiche" Original air date: November 17, 2010

=== Season 15 ===
- Release Dates: March 27, 2012 (United States), July 2, 2012 (United Kingdom)
- Special Features: Deleted Scenes, Mini-Commentaries, Behind The Scenes of "City Sushi" and the documentary "Six Days To Air – The Making Of South Park"
- The cover is based on the 12th episode of the season "1%"

Disc 1 BBFC/IFCO/OFLC/NZ RATING:15/15/MA15/R16

- "HUMANCENTiPAD" Original air date: April 27, 2011
- "Funnybot" Original air date: May 4, 2011
- "Royal Pudding" Original air date: May 11, 2011
- "T.M.I." Original air date: May 18, 2011
- "Crack Baby Athletic Association" Original air date: May 25, 2011

Disc 2 BBFC/IFCO/OFLC/NZ RATING:15/15/MA15/R16

- "City Sushi" Original air date: June 1, 2011
- "You're Getting Old" Original air date: June 8, 2011
- "Ass Burgers" Original air date: October 5, 2011
- "The Last Of The Meheecans" Original air date: October 12, 2011
- "Bass To Mouth" Original air date: October 19, 2011

Disc 3 BBFC/IFCO/OFLC/NZ RATING:15/15/MA15/R16

- "Broadway Bro Down" Original air date: October 26, 2011
- "1%" Original air date: November 2, 2011
- "A History Channel Thanksgiving" Original air date: November 9, 2011
- "The Poor Kid" Original air date: November 16, 2011

=== Season 16 ===
- Release Dates: September 24, 2013 (United States), October 28, 2013 (United Kingdom)
- The cover is based on the 6th episode of the season "I Should Have Never Gone Ziplining".

Disc 1 BBFC/IFCO/OFLC/NZ RATING:15/15/MA15/R13

- "Reverse Cowgirl" Original air date: March 14, 2012
- "Cash For Gold" Original air date: March 21, 2012
- "Faith Hilling" Original air date: March 28, 2012
- "Jewpacabra" Original air date: April 4, 2012
- "Butterballs" Original air date: April 11, 2012

Disc 2 BBFC/IFCO/OFLC/NZ RATING:15/15/MA15/R13

- "I Should Have Never Gone Ziplining" Original air date: April 18, 2012
- "Cartman Finds Love" Original air date: April 25, 2012
- "Sarcastaball" Original air date: September 26, 2012
- "Raising the Bar" Original air date: October 3, 2012
- "Insecurity" Original air date: October 10, 2012

Disc 3 BBFC/IFCO/OFLC/NZ RATING:15/15/MA15/R13

- "Going Native" Original air date: October 17, 2012
- "A Nightmare on FaceTime" Original air date: October 24, 2012
- "A Scause for Applause" Original air date: October 31, 2012
- "Obama Wins!" Original air date: November 7, 2012

=== Season 17 ===
- Release Dates: September 17, 2014 (United States), October 27, 2014 (United Kingdom)
- The cover is based on the three-part saga "Black Friday", "A Song of Ass and Fire" and "Titties and Dragons"
- The only season not to be certified by the IFCO.
- The last season to be submitted for classification for DVD/Blu-ray in New Zealand.

Disc 1 BBFC/OFLC/NZ RATING:15/MA15/R16

- "Let Go, Let Gov" Original air date: September 25, 2013
- "Informative Murder Porn" Original air date: October 2, 2013
- "World War Zimmerman" Original air date: October 9, 2013
- "Goth Kids 3: Dawn of the Posers" Original air date: October 23, 2013
- "Taming Strange" Original air date: October 30, 2013

Disc 2 BBFC/OFLC/NZ RATING:15/MA15/R16

- "Ginger Cow" Original air date: November 6, 2013
- "Black Friday" Original air date: November 13, 2013
- "A Song of Ass and Fire" Original air date: November 20, 2013
- "Titties and Dragons" Original air date: December 4, 2013
- "The Hobbit" Original air date: December 11, 2013

=== Season 18 ===
- Release Dates: October 6, 2015 (United States), November 2, 2015 (United Kingdom)
- The cover is based on The Magic Bush

Disc 1 BBFC/IFCO/OFLC RATING:15/18/MA15

- "Go Fund Yourself" Original air date: September 24, 2014
- "Gluten Free Ebola" Original air date: October 1, 2014
- "The Cissy" Original air date: October 8, 2014
- "Handicar" Original air date: October 15, 2014
- "The Magic Bush" Original air date: October 29, 2014

Disc 2 BBFC/IFCO/OFLC RATING:15/18/MA15

- "Freemium Isn't Free" Original air date: November 5, 2014
- "Grounded Vindaloop" Original air date: November 12, 2014
- "Cock Magic" Original air date: November 19, 2014
- "#REHASH" Original air date: December 3, 2014
- "#HappyHolograms" Original air date: December 10, 2014

=== Season 19 ===
- Release Dates: August 16, 2016 (United States Best Buy; Blu-ray Only), September 6, 2016 (United States)
- The cover is based on the continuity the whole season had.

Disc 1 BBFC/IFCO/OFLC RATING:15/15/MA15

- "Stunning and Brave" Original air date: September 16, 2015
- "Where My Country Gone?" Original air date: September 23, 2015
- "The City Part of Town" Original air date: September 30, 2015
- "You're Not Yelping" Original air date: October 14, 2015
- "Safe Space" Original air date: October 21, 2015

Disc 2 BBFC/IFCO/OFLC RATING:15/15/MA15

- "Tweek x Craig" Original air date: October 28, 2015
- "Naughty Ninjas" Original air date: November 11, 2015
- "Sponsored Content" Original air date: November 18, 2015
- "Truth and Advertising" Original air date: December 2, 2015
- "PC Principal Final Justice" Original air date: December 9, 2015

=== Season 20 ===
- Release Dates: June 13, 2017 (United States Best Buy; Blu-ray Only), September 5, 2017 (United States)
- The cover is based on "Skank Hunt" and "Wieners Out"
- Other information: This is one of the 2 seasons so far to be rated 18 in the UK for the content of the episodes themselves, not additional material, the other season being 22.

Disc 1 BBFC/IFCO/OFLC RATING:18/15/MA15

- "Member Berries" Original air date: September 14, 2016
- "Skank Hunt" Original air date: September 21, 2016
- "The Damned" Original air date: September 28, 2016
- "Wieners Out" Original air date: October 12, 2016
- "Douche and a Danish" Original air date: October 19, 2016

Disc 2 BBFC/IFCO/OFLC RATING:15/15/MA15

- "Fort Collins" Original air date: October 26, 2016
- "Oh, Jeez" Original air date: November 9, 2016
- "Members Only" Original air date: November 16, 2016
- "Not Funny" Original air date: November 30, 2016
- "The End of Serialization as We Know It" Original air date: December 7, 2016

=== Season 21 ===
- Release Dates: June 5, 2018 (United States), September 17, 2018 (United Kingdom)

Disc 1 BBFC/IFCO/OFLC RATING:15/15/MA15

- "White People Renovating Houses" Original air date: September 13, 2017
- "Put It Down" Original air date: September 20, 2017
- "Holiday Special" Original air date: September 27, 2017
- "Franchise Prequel" Original air date: October 11, 2017
- "Hummels & Heroin" Original air date: October 18, 2017

Disc 2 BBFC/IFCO/OFLC RATING:15/15/MA15

- "Sons a Witches" Original air date: October 25, 2017
- "Doubling Down" Original air date: November 8, 2017
- "Moss Piglets" Original air date: November 15, 2017
- "Super Hard PCness" Original air date: November 29, 2017
- "Splatty Tomato" Original air date: December 6, 2017

=== Season 22 ===
- Release Dates: May 28, 2019 (United States), September 16, 2019 (United Kingdom), July 10, 2019 (Australia)

Disc 1 BBFC/IFCO/OFLC RATING:18/18/MA15

- "Dead Kids" Original air date: September 26, 2018
- "A Boy and a Priest" Original air date: October 3, 2018
- "The Problem with a Poo" Original air date: October 10, 2018
- "Tegridy Farms" Original air date: October 17, 2018
- "The Scoots" Original air date: October 31, 2018

Disc 2 BBFC/IFCO/OFLC RATING:15/18/MA15

- "Time to Get Cereal" Original air date: November 7, 2018
- "Nobody Got Cereal?" Original air date: November 14, 2018
- "Buddha Box" Original air date: November 28, 2018
- "Unfulfilled" Original air date: December 5, 2018
- "Bike Parade" Original air date: December 12, 2018

=== Season 23 ===
- Release Dates: June 23, 2020 (United States), July 27, 2020 (United Kingdom), July 15, 2020 (Australia)

Disc 1 BBFC/IFCO/OFLC RATING:15/18/MA15

- "Mexican Joker" Original air date: September 25, 2019
- "Band in China" Original air date: October 2, 2019
- "Shots!!!" Original air date: October 9, 2019
- "Let Them Eat Goo" Original air date: October 16, 2019
- "Tegridy Farms Halloween Special" Original air date: October 30, 2019

Disc 2 BBFC/IFCO/OFLC RATING:15/18/MA15

- "Season Finale" Original air date: November 6, 2019
- "Board Girls" Original air date: November 13, 2019
- "Turd Burglars" Original air date: November 27, 2019
- "Basic Cable" Original air date: December 4, 2019
- "Christmas Snow" Original air date: December 11, 2019

=== Season 24 ===
- Release Dates: August 16, 2022 (United States) October 31, 2022 (United Kingdom)

Disc 1

- "The Pandemic Special" Original air date: September 30, 2020
- "South ParQ Vaccination Special" Original air date: March 10, 2021

== Films ==
=== South Park: Bigger, Longer, & Uncut ===
- Release Dates: November 23, 1999 (United States), March 23, 2000 (UK), June 30, 2009 (United States – Blu-ray Disc), June 25, 2024 (United States – 4K Ultra HD Blu-ray)
- Special Features: Two theatrical trailers and a teaser trailer. Some DVDs also included the "What Would Brian Boitano Do? (Part 2)" music video. The Blu-ray version included a full length audio commentary (with Parker, Stone and others) as well as trailers and the music video.
- Other Information: The US release of the film contains both English and French Audio Tracks, alongside English Subtitles. The UK and Australian release of the film only contains the English Audio Track. Due to arrangements made in the late 1990s, Paramount only owns US rights to this title. Warner Bros. has the international rights, despite Time Warner no longer owning any stake in Comedy Central.

=== South Park: Imaginationland – The Movie ===
- Release Dates: March 11, 2008 (United States), 18 June 2008 (Australia), 25 May 2009 (UK)
- Special Features: Storyboards, Full-Length Audio Commentary, "ManBearPig" (Bonus Episode), "Woodland Critter Christmas" (Bonus Episode)
- Other Information: Imaginationland: The Movie is an uncensored, uncut version of the episode trilogy, originally aired as part of the eleventh season. The movie contains material not included in the original airings or the eleventh season DVD. The three episodes are edited together to create a feature-length presentation.

== Compilations ==
=== South Park: The Hits ===
- Release dates: October 3, 2006 (United States), May 6, 2010 (UK), June 3, 2010 (Australia)
- Special features: "The Spirit of Christmas – Jesus vs. Santa" Short, Audio Commentary
- Notes: The set was released as a celebration of 10 years of South Park. Each disc has a plain design, simply reading "South Park: The Hits – Volume 1". Each disc has a chrome finish, instead of the usual Matte, with glossy outline characters. "Best Friends Forever" and "Trapped in the Closet" were released for the first time on DVD. The Region 1 version has "Volume 1" in the title, as it was originally the intention to release Volume 2 at a later point in time. However, these plans were never executed. This has been fixed in the Region 2 and 4 release of the DVD, as Disc 1 was released separately as "Volume 1", and disc 2 was released separately as "Volume 2".

Disc 1 BBFC/IFCO RATING:15/15

- "Stupid Spoiled Whore Video Playset"
- "The Return of the Lord of the Rings to the Two Towers"
- "Best Friends Forever"
- "Good Times with Weapons"
- "Casa Bonita (South Park)"
- "AWESOM-O"
- "Trapped in the Closet"

Disc 2 BBFC/IFCO RATING:15/15

- "Towelie"
- "Red Hot Catholic Love"
- "Scott Tenorman Must Die"
- "It Hits the Fan"
- "Timmy 2000"
- "Fat Butt and Pancake Head"
- "The Death Camp of Tolerance"

=== Christmas Time in South Park ===
- Release dates: November 13, 2007 (United States), November 16, 2009 (UK)
- Notes: The set was packaged in a single-disc digipak, with a golden spine designed to resemble a golden book. The release features seven of the series most festive episodes.

Disc 1 BBFC/IFCO RATING: 15/15

- "Mr. Hankey, the Christmas Poo"
- "Merry Christmas Charlie Manson!"
- "Mr. Hankey's Christmas Classics"
- "A Very Crappy Christmas"
- "Red Sleigh Down"
- "It's Christmas in Canada"
- "Woodland Critter Christmas"

=== The Cult of Cartman ===
- Release dates: October 7, 2008 (United States), August 17, 2009 (UK)
- Special features: Eric Cartman's "Life Lessons", Comedy Central Quickies, "What What in the Butt?" Music video
- Notes: The set was released as a celebration of South Park's most loved character, containing twelve uncensored episodes. "Tonsil Trouble", "Eek, a Penis!" and "Super Fun Time" were released for the first time on DVD. The set was released in a hardbound book-format that resembles the cover of the bible.

Disc 1: BBFC/IFCO RATING:15/15

- "Scott Tenorman Must Die"
- "Awesom-O"
- "The Death of Eric Cartman"
- "Cartoon Wars Part I"
- "Cartoon Wars Part II"
- "Le Petit Tourette"

Disc 2: BBFC/IFCO RATING:15/15

- "Tonsil Trouble"
- "Eek, a Penis!"
- "Cartmanland"
- "Up the Down Steroid"
- "Super Fun Time"
- "Ginger Kids"

=== A Little Box of Butters ===
- Release date: September 28, 2010 (United States), May 9, 2011 (UK – Exclusive to HMV)
- Special features: "Butter's Best Moments" Compilation
- Notes: The American release features a range of extra items included with the DVD, including a book, a badge, stickers and a mini-poster, all encased within a hardbound lockable cardboard box. The British release comes in a standard size DVD case and includes these items as PDF extras on the DVD-rom. "The Tale of Scrotie McBoogerballs" was released for the first time on DVD. On Netflix, it is called A Very BUTTERY Collection.

Disc 1: BBFC/IFCO RATING: 15/15

- "Butters' Very Own Episode"
- "Professor Chaos"
- "Simpsons Already Did It"
- "Raisins"
- "You Got F'd in the A"
- "Awesom-O"

Disc 2: BBFC/IFCO RATING: 15/15

- "Stupid Spoiled Whore Video Playset"
- "Marjorine"
- "Cartman Sucks"
- "The Ungroundable"
- "The Coon"
- "Butters' Bottom Bitch"
- "The Tale of Scrotie McBoogerballs"

=== Other compilations ===
- Unless noted, all of the following releases are exclusive to the United States.

Title	Release date	Episodes	Notes
Terrance & Phillip: Not Without My Anus	June 15, 1999	"Terrance and Phillip in Not Without My Anus"	Only issued on VHS
Christmas in South Park	November 7, 2000	"Mr. Hankey's Christmas Classics", "Merry Christmas, Charlie Manson!", "Chinpokomon"	Also includes the mockumentary "Goin' Down to South Park"
The Chef Experience	November 7, 2000	"Chef Aid", "The Succubus", "Rainforest Shmainforest"	Also includes the documentary "Chef Aid – Behind the Menu" and the music video for "Chocolate Salty Balls"
Winter Wonderland	November 6, 2001	"A Very Crappy Christmas", "Are You There God? It's Me, Jesus", "Cartman's Silly Hate Crime 2000", "Something You Can Do with Your Finger"	
Timmy!	November 6, 2001	"Timmy 2000", "4th Grade", "Helen Keller! The Musical", "The Tooth Fairy's Tats 2000"	
Insults to Injuries	June 4, 2002	"It Hits the Fan", "Cripple Fight", "Proper Condom Use", "Scott Tenorman Must Die"	
Ghouls, Ghosts and Underpants Gnomes	September 3, 2002	"Korn's Groovy Pirate Ghost Mystery", "Spookyfish", "Gnomes", "Trapper Keeper"	
The Passion of the Jew	August 31, 2004	"The Passion of the Jew", "Red Hot Catholic Love", "Christian Rock Hard"	Later issued in the UK on March 29, 2010.
When Technology Attacks	October 11, 2005	"Best Friends Forever", "Cancelled", "Simpsons Already Did It", "Towelie", "Trapper Keeper"	Only issued on PSP UMD
Good Times with Weapons	March 6, 2007	"Good Times with Weapons"	On March 6, 2007, Comedy Central began a promotion offering users of the Xbox 360 Live a free download of the Season 8 premiere, "Good Times with Weapons". It was the first time any episode had been released in HD, or Widescreen. The promotion only lasted two weeks, and was restricted to certain countries. On March 20, 2007, Best Buy continued the promotion, this time offering the episode on HD DVD, free with the purchase of any Xbox 360 or HD DVD System. The DVD featured a Dolby Digital Plus 2.0 soundtrack, and a VC-1 encoded picture.
Risk of Exposure	August 31, 2011	"Sexual Healing", "Dances with Smurfs", "The New Terrance and Phillip Movie Trailer"	Only available at HMV stores in the UK

- The first season and two thirds of the second season of the show (except for "Terrance and Phillip in Not Without My Anus") were issued in separate compilation volumes before their release as a box set. These are not listed here, as the volume releases comprise exactly the same order as each box-set, with four episodes per disc.
