= Roids =

Roids is an abbreviated form in popular usage and may refer to:

- Anabolic steroids (AAS), drugs that have similar effects to testosterone in the body
  - Roid rage, a side effect of AAS
- Hemorrhoids (pathological), inflamed vascular structures in the anal canal that, under normal conditions when not inflamed, help with stool control
