= The List (South Park) =

- South Park episode
- Episode no.: Season 11; Episode 14
- Directed by: Trey Parker
- Written by: Trey Parker
- Production code: 1114
- Original air date: November 14, 2007

Episode chronology
← Previous "Guitar Queer-O"	Next → "Tonsil Trouble"
- South Park season 11

"The List" is the fourteenth episode and season finale of the eleventh season of the American animated television series South Park, and the 167th episode of the series overall. It first aired on Comedy Central in the United States on November 14, 2007.

In the episode, the fourth grade girls have made a secret list that rates every boy's looks from cutest to ugliest. When the boys steal the list, they are completely unprepared to deal with the results.

== Plot ==
The boys discover that the girls in their class have made a list of them, ranking their looks from cutest to ugliest. The boys, after two attempts, eventually succeed in stealing the list and discover it ranks Clyde as the cutest, and Kyle as the ugliest, with Cartman just above him. Kyle's spirits plummet after this discovery, while Clyde's ego inflates dramatically and he starts flirting with many girls at school. He takes pity on Kyle and kindly reassures him that Abraham Lincoln, who was apparently ugly, accomplished so much. Kyle, in an act of depression, starts hanging out with the ugly kids, and gets the idea from a boy named Jamal to burn the school down. He is visited by the ghost of Abraham Lincoln, who shows him that ugliness can be a blessing in disguise; ugly people like Jamal have nothing handed to them and they must earn what they seek and will thus develop character, while beautiful people will have no redeeming character when their looks begin to fade. Kyle decides to go ahead with his plans of arson regardless, citing the long wait he would have to endure in order to realize this blessing, and the hardships and misery he would suffer in the interim, much to the ghostly Lincoln's frustration.

Meanwhile, Stan watches Kyle's behavior with increasing unease. Eventually, he asks his ex-girlfriend Wendy (who thought that he wasn't going to speak to her again) why Kyle was voted ugliest. Wendy begins investigating and discovers that the ballots were rigged in Clyde's favor: Since Clyde's father owns a shoe store, some of the girls wanted to make Clyde popular to justify dating him and getting free shoes. They hid the real list and forged a new one, meaning that the girls let the boys steal the list. Wendy steals the real list from them and she and Stan run off to find Kyle, who is about to set the school on fire.

Stan and Wendy explain the truth to Kyle, when Bebe shows up and holds them at gunpoint, while admitting that Kyle was a "casualty" of their plot. However, Wendy has called the police, who arrive almost at once. Bebe is shocked, which Wendy takes advantage of to wrestle the gun from her. A shot goes off; however, neither Wendy nor Bebe are hurt. The bullet flies off, killing Kenny at home. Bebe is arrested, and the list is burned after Kyle refuses to take a look at the real list, fearing an inflated ego that Abraham Lincoln's ghost warned him about. Wendy admits to Stan that she has enjoyed his company and feels that he has changed a lot since their breakup. Unfortunately for Wendy, Stan has not quite lost his habit of throwing up out of nervousness and her attempt to kiss him is interrupted when he vomits in her face, but this marks their reconciliation and they resume their romantic relationship.

=== Extended ending ===
There is an extension to the ending, which has the list being burned, only for a vomit-covered Wendy to reveal that she looked at the list and reveals that Eric Cartman is the ugliest boy. The final scene shows Cartman at lunch having to eat with the ugly kids. Butters is now mocking him. He tries to convince everyone that it doesn't matter and it's what is on the inside that counts—but he then remembers who that is and gets even more depressed.

== Production ==
"The List" was written and directed by series co-founder Trey Parker, and was rated TV-MA L in the United States. It first aired on November 14, 2007 in the United States on Comedy Central. Shortly after "The List" was originally broadcast, T-shirts and hooded sweatshirts based on the episode were made available at South Park Studios, the official South Park website. The shirt design featured a hip-looking Clyde wearing his letterman jacket. When Kenny gets shot, the pop tarts come out of the toaster, a reference to where Butch kills Vincent and the toaster pastries come out of the toaster in Pulp Fiction.

== Reception ==
IGN gave the episode a rating of 8.9, citing it "an excellent episode and a fine way to end the season".
