= Up the Down Steroid =

- South Park episode
- Episode no.: Season 8 Episode 2
- Directed by: Trey Parker
- Written by: Trey Parker
- Production code: 803
- Original air date: March 24, 2004

Episode chronology
← Previous "Good Times with Weapons"	Next → "The Passion of the Jew"
- South Park season 8

"Up the Down Steroid" is the second episode in the eighth season of the American animated television series South Park, and the 113th episode of the series overall. Going by production order, it is the second episode of Season 8 instead of third. The episode originally aired on Comedy Central in the United States on March 24, 2004. In the episode, Jimmy enters the special Olympics but starts using steroids to improve his performance while Cartman, believing he will have an advantage over the other kids, disguises himself as handicapped so that he can enter and win the $1,000 cash prize. The title of the episode is a parody of the book Up the Down Staircase.

== Plot ==
Timmy Burch and Jimmy Valmer are eager to represent Team USA at the 2004 World Kids Disability Games in Denver. Eric Cartman decides to fake being disabled and attempt to beat all the handicapped kids in the events to win the $1,000 prize. Jimmy is talked into taking steroids by Nathan to increase his chances of winning. Jimmy manages to keep his use of it a secret from everyone except for Timmy (who discovers the drugs after he accidentally dropped the bag and spilled the contents). While Timmy frowns on this, much to his frustration he is unable to explain the situation to the school counselor Mr. Mackey, due to his inability to say anything other than his own and Jimmy's names.

Jimmy begins to neglect his girlfriend and studies as a result of his steroid use. When his girlfriend grows tired of neglect and announces she is leaving him, Jimmy flies into a steroid rage and savagely attacks his girlfriend and mother. Kyle Broflovski repeatedly tries to talk Cartman out of his plans, but is ignored. After Cartman learns that he must have a parent accompany him to the Games in order to sign up and compete, Cartman manipulates his mother to take him to the Games and she reluctantly accepts. When the Games arrive, Cartman finds that his expectations were mistaken and his plan has failed, as he is out-of-shape and actually much less athletic than the disabled competitors, who outperform him in every event. In contrast, Jimmy handily wins most of the events, much to Timmy's silent disapproval.

At the closing ceremonies, the prizes are given by Mark McGwire, Jason Giambi and Barry Bonds- all of whom were ironically involved in baseball's steroids scandal. Jimmy sets multiple records and was named the 2004 games' "Special Olympian", winning the $1,000 prize in the process. Cartman, despite his poor performance, wins a "spirit award" for coming last — consisting of a $50 gift certificate for Shakey's Pizza. When he goes to collect the prize, Jimmy recognizes Cartman and is about to attack him for cheating, but Timmy intervenes, and Jimmy realizes that he is equally guilty of cheating himself. Jimmy confesses his drug use to the crowd and returns his medal, asking for his records to be cancelled and condemning those who use steroids as "pussies" (all the while the camera focuses on McGwire, Giambi, and Bonds). Jimmy bumps into McGwire, who commends him for being honest. Cartman then claims to Stan and Kyle that he pretended to be handicapped in order for Jimmy to learn his lesson. When it is obvious that they do not believe Cartman, he angrily tells Stan and Kyle to "grow up" and walks away.

== Production ==
There was some controversy surrounding "Up the Down Steroid" and the 2005 film The Ringer, as both feature the same plot: Someone pretending to be disabled in order to compete in the Special Olympics. According to the episode's DVD audio commentary, series co-creators Trey Parker and Matt Stone did not think that they ripped off The Ringer, since the idea to them did not seem hard to come up with, and they did not even think it was big enough for a twenty-minute episode, let alone a two-hour film.

In the opening scene, the boys are playing the same "Investigative Reports with Bill Kurtis" funtime game as they did in the season four episode "Cartman Joins NAMBLA".

The episode's title refers to the 1964 young adult novel, Up the Down Staircase, by Bel Kaufman, which was adapted into a film in 1967 starring Sandy Dennis. Trey Parker admitted he had to perform this story in a high school play and hated it. Additionally, Stone admitted in the commentary that he once pretended to be disabled to get into Six Flags Magic Mountain for half price.

== Home media ==
"Up the Down Steroid", along with the thirteen other episodes from South Park's eighth season, was released on a three-disc DVD set in the United States on August 29, 2006. The set includes brief audio commentaries by Parker and Stone for each episode. Up the Down Steroid was also released as part of The Cult of Cartman, a 2008 DVD compilation of Cartman-centric episodes.

== See also ==
- 2000 Spanish Paralympic cheating scandal, with which Cartman's behavior has parallels to.
- Doping in sport
