= Britney's New Look =

- South Park episode
- Episode no.: Season 12; Episode 2
- Directed by: Trey Parker
- Written by: Trey Parker
- Production code: 1202
- Original air date: March 19, 2008

Episode chronology
← Previous "Tonsil Trouble"	Next → "Major Boobage"
- South Park season 12

"Britney's New Look" is the second episode in the twelfth season of the animated television series South Park, and the 169th episode of the series overall. It originally aired on Comedy Central in the United States on March 19, 2008. In the episode, Kyle Broflovski and Stan Marsh take pity on Britney Spears after a botched suicide attempt, and are consequently intertwined into an ancient conspiracy.

The episode parodies the American short story "The Lottery".

== Plot summary ==
A live political debate between Barack Obama and Hillary Clinton is interrupted by breaking news on Britney Spears, who has been sighted urinating on a ladybug. After hearing that the photographer was paid a large sum for the image, Stan Marsh, Kyle Broflovski, and Eric Cartman attempt to photograph a similar event, goading a reluctant Butters Stotch into joining them. They bypass security at the Komfort Inn, where Britney is staying, by claiming to be her children. Britney is initially excited, but upon realizing the truth, she falls into a deeper depression and attempts suicide by shooting herself in the head. Cartman and Butters quickly leave the scene; the latter, dressed as a squirrel, is later mistaken for a real squirrel and captured by animal control.

Britney survives, but most of her head is missing, and Kyle and Stan become overcome with guilt for pushing her. When paparazzi begin hounding Britney, her manager sneaks her and the boys out the back door into his car, with the paparazzi in pursuit. They escape to her recording studio, where she is made to record a comeback song, which Stan and Kyle insist will simply make matters worse. She later performs at the MTV Video Music Awards, where her performance goes awry while the crowd aggressively heckles Britney, ignoring her visible distress.

The boys realize the constant emotional toll on Britney and devise a plan to relocate her to the North Pole by train. Stan and Britney board the train, while Kyle diverts the paparazzi and eventually confronts them for abusing her, pointing out that she is no longer in any condition to handle it and that she might die. To Kyle's horror, they explain that they are actively attempting to kill Britney. On the train, an engineer recognizes Britney and stops in a field, where paparazzi encircle the train. Stan and Britney escape before ending up at a village site where the paparazzi, villagers, and Kyle are waiting. The villagers explain to the boys that ritual human sacrifice is needed for a successful corn harvest; in modern, more civilized times, people prefer to drive their sacrifices to suicide rather than stone them. The crowd overwhelms Britney and compulsively photographs her to death, leaving Stan and Kyle horrified.

Time passes, and the residents shop at a supermarket following the harvest. A news report is broadcast on TV, reporting that Miley Cyrus is rapidly rising in popularity. The townsfolk are mesmerized and thus see her as their next target. Stan and Kyle reluctantly join in their chant, having given up all hope of reasoning with them.

== Cultural references ==
The basic plot of the episode parodies Shirley Jackson's short story, "The Lottery", from which several lines of dialogue in the episode directly derive.

When attempting to sneak away from the paparazzi at the hospital, one reporter emits a piercing scream while pointing at the escaping boys and Spears's manager, identical to the behavior of the pod people from Invasion of the Body Snatchers.

The repeated motif of "leaving Britney alone" due to stress and depression originates from a viral video by vlogger Cara Cunningham.

The plot involving getting Spears to the North Pole and the narration on the train parodies the classic 1969 animated holiday TV special "Frosty the Snowman".

== Reception ==
IGN gave the episode a score of 6 out of 10 stating the episode was more like, "series of near misses as opposed to a complete disaster". Blogcritics.org also gave a mixed review, saying that "The human sacrifice metaphor is apt, but much of the comedy falls flat".

== Home media ==
"Britney's New Look", along with the thirteen other episodes from South Park's twelfth season, were released on a three-disc DVD set and two-disc Blu-ray set in the United States on March 10, 2009. The sets included brief audio commentaries by Parker and Stone for each episode, a collection of deleted scenes, and two special mini-features, The Making of 'Major Boobage' and Six Days to South Park.
