= You Got F'd in the A =

- South Park episode
- Episode no.: Season 8 Episode 4
- Directed by: Trey Parker
- Written by: Trey Parker
- Production code: 805
- Original air date: April 7, 2004

Guest appearance
- Ming Yao as Yao

Episode chronology
← Previous "The Passion of the Jew"	Next → "Awesom-O"
- South Park season 8

"You Got F'd in the A" (often retitled "You Got..." or "You Got Served" on television listings) is the fourth episode of the eighth season of the Comedy Central series South Park, and the 115th episode overall. Going by production order, it is the fifth episode of Season 8 instead of the fourth. Initially broadcast on April 7, 2004, the episode is a parody of high school dance-off movies such as Bring It On and You Got Served. 8 Mile is also alluded to.

In the episode, Stan has been challenged to a dance-off, and it is up to him to put together a team of South Park's best dancers to compete against a troupe from Orange County, California. While Butters has won awards for his dancing, he refuses to help Stan. Butters has not been able to dance since the tragic death of eight (conditionally as high as 11) audience members at his last competition two years prior.

== Plot ==
Stan and his friends are playing with radio-controlled cars when a group of kids from Orange County come and dance in front of them, thus "serving" them. The group leaves after trash-talking Stan and the boys, who are left confused by the confrontation. The kids talk to Chef, unaware of what being "served" entails. Chef immediately shows great concern and calls their parents to inform them about the ordeal and assure them that their children are safe. Later, over dinner, Stan's dad, Randy, gets upset about his son being served and "teaches" him to dance back with a few very basic line dancing steps to the tune of Billy Ray Cyrus' "Achy Breaky Heart".

The next time Stan gets served by the Orange County kids, he serves them back, switching CDs on the boombox so that he may dance to "Achy Breaky Heart". After Stan dances, Cartman tells the Orange County kids, "You just got F'd in the A!", and Kyle tells them that they got served. The Orange County Kids then respond by declaring that "it's on", meaning that there is now a dance contest to be had, the Orange County kids versus the best dancers in South Park.

Sharon berates Randy about his telling and teaching Stan to dance back, as it was this which led to it being "on". Randy goes to the Orange County team to apologize and make it clear that "it's not on; it's off", but the Orange County coach takes this as a challenge and goes on to serve Randy with some exceptional dance moves. Randy winds up in the hospital with the worst case of "being served" that his doctor has ever seen. After an exchange in the hospital, Stan hopes that he is finally being let off the hook, but Randy makes it clear that he expects Stan to avenge him at the competition.

Stan goes out to find the town's best dancers: Michael, the leader of the goth kids' gang (who only agrees to do so after the others dismiss the dance contest as too conformist, thus showing he is non-conformist enough to refuse to conform to even his fellow goths); an Asian kid named Yao, who is a Dance Dance Revolution expert (yet he claims that he cannot dance without the machine, a pastime he perceives as stupid); and Mercedes, a server at Raisins (as Michael insists they need a girl on their team or everyone will think they are "fags"). Needing a fifth member, Mercedes suggests Butters, who was once the state tap-dancing champion. However, when they ask him to join, Butters is stunned and runs away screaming.

It is revealed through flashback two years prior that Butters' shoe flew off during the national Tap-Dancing Finals, hit a stage light in the rafters, and led to an extremely gruesome chain of events that left eight people in the audience dead. (Butters later learns to his horror from Stan that the total death count was actually 11, because one woman was pregnant and two family members killed themselves after the tragedy.) This all happened to the upbeat (and risqué) tune of "I've Got Something in My Front Pocket for You". Butters flatly refuses to participate in the show, even after further pressing, so the team has to settle for a dancing duck named Jeffy from a local farm. Jeffy has not danced to any songs other than those about drug use and domestic violence played by the farmer, all to extensively modified lyrics of the song "The Crawdad Song".

On the day of the performance, Jeffy sprains his ankle during practice. The team looks likely to be forced to forfeit, as competition rules require a mandatory five members. However, Butters suddenly arrives in his tap-dancing outfit just in time, allowing the kids to perform. However, during the performance, Butters' shoe flies off again and hits a stage light, causing the rafter to fall on and kill the entire Orange County team along with their coach. Although Butters is horrified by this, the South Park team wins by default, and a bloodstained, screaming and horribly traumatized Butters is carried off and hailed as a hero.

== Release ==
The episode was released on the two-disc DVD collection A Little Box of Butters.
