= Good Times with Weapons =

- South Park episode
- The boys in their ninja personae
- Episode no.: Season 8 Episode 1
- Directed by: Trey Parker
- Written by: Trey Parker
- Production code: 801
- Original air date: March 17, 2004

Episode chronology
← Previous "It's Christmas in Canada"	Next → "Up the Down Steroid"
- South Park season 8

"Good Times with Weapons" is the first episode of the eighth season of the American animated series South Park and the 112th episode of the series. It originally aired on March 17, 2004. In the episode, the boys are transformed into Japanese warriors after they buy martial arts weapons at a local market. Their sworn enemy, Professor Chaos, confronts them and a battle ensues. The episode's animation routinely switches from the usual cutout-and-solid-color style to a highly stylized anime theme.

This was the first episode with April Stewart as the bulk of the female characters following Eliza Schneider's departure. The episode was written by series co-creator Trey Parker. In 2015, he and co-creator Matt Stone listed it as their second favorite episode of the series. The episode was rated TV-MA L in the United States.

== Plot ==
At the Park County Fair, the boys find a vendor selling East Asian weapons. Stan, Kyle, Cartman, and Kenny each purchase a weapon. After showing their weapons off to Craig, Clyde, and Token the boys go around town pretending to be ninjas. Butters sees them playing and wants to join but the boys refuse to let him. Butters then goes home and becomes his supervillain alter ego, Professor Chaos, and sets off to get his revenge on the four ninjas. Professor Chaos neutralizes Kyle and Stan, so Kenny comes to their defense and throws one of his shuriken. It hits Butters in the eye and becomes lodged in it. They realize that Butters needs medical attention, but taking him to the local hospital would result in their parents discovering their purchases. When an attempt to extract the shuriken from his eye fails, the boys decide to dress Butters up like a dog and take him to a veterinarian.

On the way, the boys encounter Craig, Jimmy, Clyde, and Token, who have obtained weapons from the same vendor. The two ninja groups fight, but in the midst of all the chaos, Butters escapes. A weakened, delirious Butters makes his way to the hospital, but they assume he's a dog and send him to the animal hospital. There, the veterinarian determines that the only thing to do is to put Butters to sleep, but Butters escapes. The boys return to the fair. Craig informs them that they have seen Butters wandering around on the other side of the fair towards an auction that all their parents are attending. Cartman decides to use his presumed ninja power of invisibility to walk across the auction stage to get to Butters undetected, and removes his clothes. However, Cartman just ends up streaking slowly across the stage. Butters staggers onto the stage and collapses.

Later, the townsfolk protest at a meeting at the community center over Cartman's public nudity, rather than the shuriken in Butter's eye. Cartman explains that it was a "wardrobe malfunction," a reference to the recent Super Bowl XXXVIII halftime show controversy over a wardrobe malfunction. Stan, Kyle, and Kenny note that their parents are more offended by sex than violence and go out to play with their weapons again.

== Production ==
This episode features some ninja counterparts of the original cast of characters that appears to be modeled after the video game sprites from Capcom's Street Fighter Alpha 3. "Let's Fighting Love" is a theme song that mixes Japanese and English lyrics in a style parody of anime theme songs including that of Dragon Ball Z. The song is performed by Parker.

== Home media ==
"Good Times with Weapons", along with the thirteen other episodes from South Park's eighth season, was released on a three-disc DVD set in the United States on August 29, 2006. The set includes brief audio commentaries by Parker and Stone for each episode. In 2006, the episode was also included in South Park – The Hits: Volume 1, a DVD compilation which features Parker and Stone's ten favorite episodes.

On March 6, 2007, the day before the 11th season began, this episode was re-rendered in HD at 16:9 widescreen and was free with purchases of an Xbox 360 console or HD DVD Drive at Best Buy on a single HD DVD disc from March 20 to April 3. It was also free on the Xbox 360 marketplace for two weeks from March 6 to March 20.
