= It's Christmas in Canada =

- South Park episode
- Episode no.: Season 7 Episode 15
- Directed by: Trey Parker
- Written by: Trey Parker
- Production code: 715
- Original air date: December 17, 2003

Episode chronology
← Previous "Raisins"	Next → "Good Times with Weapons"
- South Park season 7

"It's Christmas in Canada" (sometimes called "Christmas in Canada") is the fifteenth and final episode of the seventh season of the American animated series South Park and the 111th episode of the series. The episode originally aired on December 17, 2003 and was nominated for an Emmy Award. The episode parodies the film The Wizard of Oz.

In the episode, the Broflovski family is dealt a devastating blow when Ike's Canadian birth parents show up unexpectedly, and want their baby back. When the townspeople decide to forgo Christmas gifts and take up a collection to get Ike home to South Park, the boys are distraught. Before all the money for their Christmas presents gets spent, they hightail it to Canada to bring Ike home themselves.

This was the final episode to feature Eliza Schneider's voice due to pay concerns.

== Plot ==
The Broflovski family is celebrating Hanukkah when a Canadian couple, Harry and Elise Gintz, arrive at their home and reveal themselves to be the biological parents of Ike, whom they call by his birth name, Peter. They explain that they gave Ike up for adoption during the Cola wars in Canada, but now wish to reclaim him. Under a new law enacted by the Prime Minister of Canada, all Canadian-born children adopted by American families must be returned to their biological parents. Despite the Broflovskis’ objections, the court is unable to overturn the law and Ike is returned to the Gintzes. Concerned about his parents’ growing distress, Kyle seeks help from his friends, though Cartman is more concerned about Christmas presents, while Stan hopes for another Christmas adventure.

The residents of South Park agree to donate their Christmas gift money to fund the Broflovskis’ legal battle, prompting Kyle to propose retrieving Ike before Christmas to make the donations unnecessary. The boys persuade City Wok owner Tuong Lu Kim to fly them to Canada, but the plane experiences mechanical problems and runs out of fuel. Tuong parachutes to safety, leaving the boys to crash-land in Canada. They encounter several Canadians, including Scott, an abrasive Canadian who resents Americans. Traveling toward Ottawa along the “only road” in Canada, they meet others affected by the Prime Minister’s laws: Rick, a Mountie forced to ride a sheep instead of a horse; a French Canadian mime prohibited from drinking wine; and Steve, a Newfoundlander forbidden from practicing sodomy. Upon discovering that the group is traveling in the wrong direction, Steve offers to transport them by boat.

At the Centre Block of the Parliament Buildings, a guard initially refuses the boys entry, claiming that the Prime Minister is in China. However, the group’s distress persuades him to admit that he was lying and allow them inside. The Prime Minister, appearing as a gigantic floating head, refuses to repeal his laws. Scott arrives with the Gintzes, and both he and Kyle appeal to the Prime Minister, who responds to Kyle’s argument by vaporizing Kenny. Stan discovers that the Prime Minister is actually a mechanical creation controlled by Saddam Hussein from a spider-hole. Saddam is arrested, and his laws are repealed, referencing the real-life capture of Saddam Hussein four days before the episode aired.

Recognizing Kyle’s devotion to his brother, the Gintzes allow Ike to choose where he wishes to live, and he returns to Kyle. Cartman becomes furious upon realizing they have missed Christmas, but Kyle insists that reuniting with Ike is more important. Cartman attempts to fight Kyle, who responds with a single slap that leaves Cartman crying for his mother. Rick then invites the boys to celebrate Christmas Canadian-style by joining a parade commemorating Saddam’s capture. Disappointed by their Christmas experience, Stan expresses hope for a better adventure the following year.
