= Awesom-O =

- South Park episode
- Episode no.: Season 8 Episode 5
- Directed by: Trey Parker
- Written by: Trey Parker
- Production code: 802
- Original air date: April 14, 2004

Episode chronology
← Previous "You Got F'd in the A"	Next → "The Jeffersons"
- South Park season 8

"Awesom-O" is the fifth episode in the eighth season of the American animated television series South Park. The 116th episode overall, it originally aired on Comedy Central in the United States on April 14, 2004. The episode is second in the production order of season eight and was written and directed by series co-creator Trey Parker.

In the episode, Cartman masquerades as a robot, named AWESOM-O, in an attempt to gain Butters' trust, hoping he can convince Butters to tell him secrets he can use to embarrass Butters. While Butters is thrilled to have found a new best friend, Hollywood is after the phony robot to develop their next big blockbuster and the U.S. Army believes AWESOM-O is a new secret weapon.

== Plot ==
Cartman plays a prank on Butters by disguising himself in a crude cardboard suit as a robot named "A.W.E.S.O.M.-O 4000" and by putting himself in a crate from Japan on Butters's doorstep. Cartman befriends Butters while in the robot suit just to discover Butters' most embarrassing secrets, which will allow Cartman to blackmail him and/or embarrass him in school. Butters falls for the trick and reveals personal secrets. Just as Cartman is about to reveal his identity, Butters mentions that he himself knows one of Cartman's secrets: a videotape of Cartman doing a Britney Spears dance routine to a life-sized cutout of Justin Timberlake while dressed as her and making out with the cutout, which Butters plans to show everyone the next time Cartman plays a prank on him.

Cartman, terrified of Butters' revenge plan, searches desperately for the tape (while still in disguise), but to no avail. Eventually, Cartman begins starving because Butters believes that Cartman does not need to eat since he is a robot. Butters also forces the robot to do all his chores for him, including some of the more unpleasant tasks. With the agreement of Ms. Cartman, who is willing to temporarily let her son off punishment for trying to exterminate the Jews two weeks prior, Butters' parents (knowing who AWESOM-O really is, but thinking it is an elaborate game that Butters is participating in) decide to let Cartman come along with Butters on a trip to Los Angeles to see his aunt. Cartman realizes that he will have to accompany Butters on the journey in order to keep up his disguise. Upon arriving, he is so hungry and worn out after wearing the suit for a whole airplane ride that he makes up an excuse to use the bathroom and proceeds to eat toothpaste.

During their visit to Catamount Pictures, two movie producers find out about AWESOM-O and decide to hire it to create movie ideas. Cartman, as the robot, comes up with over two thousand film concepts (800 of which would star Adam Sandler), which the movie producers all find brilliant. The fortune Cartman makes from the movie ideas is donated to charity by Butters, who believes that AWESOM-O does not need the money. Meanwhile, the U.S. military hears about AWESOM-O and decides to capture it and make it into a weapon. Cartman flees the movie studio in panic after a film producer tries to engage in sexual activity with him, thinking that he may also be a pleasure model. The military captures Cartman by shocking him and conveying him to a secret base.

Cartman tries to explain that he is just a kid. However, the military still believes that Cartman is a robot with artificial intelligence enabling him to think like a human, going so far as to possess the memories of a nonexistent eight-year-old child. A scientist attempts to save Cartman, who is about to reveal that he is a human when Butters shows up to rescue Cartman. Cartman maintains his disguise, allowing the military to kill the rebellious scientist. Butters pleads with the military to spare AWESOM-O, and the general is touched. Just as it appears he will get off undetected, Cartman accidentally farts, and his attempts to cover it up fails, causing everyone to suspect him and finally discover Cartman's true identity.

Butters carries out his promise and shows the video to the whole town, the movie producers, and the military at a special screening. There is laughter from the whole audience, except for Cartman, who is feeling humiliated.

== Production ==
"Awesom-O" has one of the shortest production cycles in South Park's history, being produced in just three days while series co-creators Trey Parker and Matt Stone attended a wedding in Hawaii. In the days leading up to the initial airing, commercials that ran on Comedy Central teased a plot that would see a return of Lemmiwinks from Season 6's The Death Camp of Tolerance in the upcoming episode. However, as the air date neared, this promo was changed to reflect the plot of "Awesom-O" instead. The episode starts with a cold open stating that the return of Lemmiwinks will not be seen tonight because of tragic events in Hawaii. Lemmiwinks would later make a return in the Season 15 episode "Bass to Mouth" instead.

The name of Cartman's robotic alter ego is derived from Honda's ASIMO humanoid robot.

The song Let Me Tell You About My Robot Friend sung by Butters in the episode is a parody rendering of Girlfriend by Harry Nilsson.

Parker and Stone have since spoken positively of the episode, selecting it as one of their 15 favorites in the show's run. Parker reflected, "We were trying to think of a situation to put a kid in that felt really original. So Cartman is trying to f--- Butters and he gets stuck in this robot costume. There are so many great Cartman/Butters episodes. That's definitely one of them." Stone highlighted the scene where "Cartman is starving and he eats toothpaste" as one of the best in the show's run.

The episode, which aired in 2004, is regarded as an early, satirical prediction of AI slop—specifically, the generation of low-quality, formulaic content. While the writers did not explicitly predict the technical capabilities of modern Large Language Models in 2004, they accurately satirized the cultural and industrial result of automating creative thought: a flood of, as Cartman calls them, lame ideas.

== Home media ==
"Awesom-O", along with the thirteen other episodes from South Park's eighth season, was released on a three-disc DVD set in the United States on August 29, 2006. The set includes brief audio commentaries by Parker and Stone for each episode. The episode was also released on the 2-disc DVD collection A Little Box of Butters.
