= Major Boobage =

- South Park episode
- Episode no.: Season 12; Episode 3
- Directed by: Trey Parker
- Written by: Trey Parker
- Production code: 1203
- Original air date: March 26, 2008

Episode chronology
← Previous "Britney's New Look"	Next → "Canada on Strike"
- South Park season 12

"Major Boobage" is the third episode in twelfth season of the American animated television series South Park. The 170th episode of the series overall, it originally aired on Comedy Central in the United States on March 26, 2008. The episode was written and directed by series co-creator Trey Parker.

In the episode, Kenny becomes addicted to a hallucinogen induced by a new craze in South Park called "cheesing" from being exposed to cat urine. He experiences hallucinations that are patterned after the 1981 Canadian animated film Heavy Metal, in which he pursues a buxom female in a setting whose motif is based entirely on breasts. The episode also includes references to Jenkem, The Diary of Anne Frank and Eliot Spitzer's 2008 prostitution scandal. The episode is rated TV-MA-LSV in the United States for strong language, sexual content, and violence.

== Plot ==
Mr. Mackey lectures the kids on the dangers of choking themselves to get high, as well as other methods that are becoming popular, including getting high off cat urine. Mr. Mackey explains that urine used by male cats to mark their territory in the presence of other male cats can cause one to become intoxicated when inhaled. Out of curiosity, the boys go to Cartman's house and frighten Cartman's cat, Mr. Kitty into spraying urine into Kenny's face. Kenny has a psychedelic drug trip in which he travels to another planet and meets a woman with large breasts who inhabits a fantasy kingdom strewn with breast shapes. As Kenny is about to bathe with her, Cartman wakes him up; in reality Kenny has been running around outdoors and removing his clothes. Kenny angrily attacks him for interrupting. Stan and Kyle stop him and suggest they abstain permanently from cat urine.

The new drug craze becomes national news, with Fox News calling it "cheesing." Kyle's parents become alarmed and inform the other parents. Gerald Broflovski drafts a bill that will make cats illegal in South Park, whereupon all cats are taken into custody by the DEA. Cartman hides Mr. Kitty in his attic and suggests that he should "write a diary." He also reluctantly hides many of the neighborhood cats.

Meanwhile Kenny is still able to get cat urine and becomes addicted. The boys take his cat and talk him through withdrawal. Kyle's mother Sheila finds the cat in Kyle's dresser drawer; Kyle denies that it is his but is grounded nonetheless. Gerald takes the cat downstairs and relapses into an earlier cheesing habit after ten years clean. He travels to the fantasy kingdom in a B-17 bomber and meets the woman. Her father, the ruler, tells him that they cannot bathe because Kenny has arrived first, having found Cartman's cat hoard.

Kenny and Gerald battle in a gladiatorial arena, which in reality turns out to be a playground sandbox. Ashamed of his behavior, Gerald makes a public apology with an indignant Sheila by his side and lifts the ban on cats. He tells his audience that it is not the fault of cats, as the cats only produce urine, while people choose to use it.

Cartman says he has learned that beings cannot be deprived of their freedom. Upon hearing this, Kyle then asks Cartman whether he does not notice a similarity between the recent happenings and anything else in history (alluding to the holocaust), but Cartman sees none. The boys see Kenny sniffing flowers and are relieved that he is off the cheese, but then realize that he is getting high from the pollen. Kenny races through the fantasy world in a Trans Am with the woman at his side.

== Production ==
The episode took eight weeks to complete, which is eight times that of a normal episode, due to the use of traditional animation in order to make it resemble the film Heavy Metal.

The female object of Kenny's affections in the episode was portrayed by pornographic actress Lisa Daniels, live-action video of whom was converted to animated form by rotoscoping.

Two different songs are alternately played in the "cheese trip" portions of the episode: "Heavy Metal (Takin' a Ride)" by Don Felder and "Heavy Metal" by Sammy Hagar. "Radar Rider" by Riggs is played briefly during the arena scene. All three songs originally appeared on the Heavy Metal soundtrack.

== Cultural references ==
The press conference Gerald has with his wife standing next to him was made to look just like when former New York Governor Eliot Spitzer publicly apologized for being a client in a prostitution ring. Spitzer's apology occurred nine days prior to the episode's airdate. Spitzer's sex scandal was parodied again in the episode "Sexual Healing".

== Reception ==
Travis Fickett of IGN gave the episode a score of 9.0 out of 10, calling it "a terrific episode – funny throughout". Fickett saw the episode, which he felt contained more laughs in its first two minutes than in the prior two episodes combined, as a return of the series to high quality after a less impressive season opener. Fickett lauded the episode's ability to combine social commentary with the "absurd" references to the film Heavy Metal, and praised the various "great small moments" in the story, including Cartman being oblivious to the historical parallels in his concern over the cats, Butters calmly reassuring Kenny after being vomited on by him, Mr. Mackey's realization he should not have mentioned how the cat urine can be used as a hallucinogen, etc.

"Major Boobage" was the first episode to exceed a million views at South Park Studios.

== Home media ==
"Major Boobage", along with the thirteen other episodes from South Park's twelfth season, were released on a three-disc DVD and Blu-ray set in the United States on March 10, 2009. The sets included brief audio commentaries by Parker and Stone for each episode, a collection of deleted scenes, and two special mini-features, The Making of Major Boobage and Six Days to South Park.
