= Tonsil Trouble =

- South Park episode
- Episode no.: Season 12; Episode 1
- Directed by: Trey Parker
- Written by: Trey Parker
- Production code: 1201
- Original air date: March 12, 2008

Episode chronology
| ← Previous "The List" | Next → "Britney's New Look" |
- South Park season 12

"Tonsil Trouble" is the first episode in the twelfth season of the American animated television series South Park, and the 168th episode of the series overall. Written and directed by series co-creator Trey Parker, it first aired on Comedy Central in the United States on March 12, 2008. In the episode, Eric Cartman contracts HIV due to a botched blood transfusion. When Kyle Broflovski laughs at Cartman's misfortune, Cartman intentionally infects Kyle with his disease as well. The episode was rated TV-MA L for strong language in the United States. In reruns, it airs with the tamer rating TV-14. The episode is a satire on the new and effective AIDS treatments that are inaccessible to the majority of the population suffering from or carrying the disease.

== Plot ==
During a tonsillectomy, Eric Cartman is inadvertently infected with HIV after a botched blood transfusion. When Cartman's classmates are notified of his diagnosis, Kyle Broflovski begins laughing uncontrollably, believing that Cartman's HIV is justly deserved. A benefit is held for Cartman, but is sparsely attended as most people are apathetic to AIDS and cancer has become more focused on. Elton John does not arrive as scheduled, so Jimmy Buffett performs in his place, to Cartman's anger.

When Cartman confronts his friends the following morning, Kyle continues laughing and promptly leaves. Enraged at Kyle's reaction, Cartman sneaks into Kyle's room later that night with Butters Stotch's help and purposely infects Kyle with HIV by drawing his own blood and dropping it into Kyle's mouth as the latter sleeps. Kyle and his mother, Sheila, find out from Dr. Doctor, and Kyle immediately suspects Cartman. In a bloodthirsty rage, Kyle confronts Cartman at the playground and begins beating him until Mr. Mackey breaks them up. Principal Victoria reprimands Cartman for infecting Kyle, as well as Kyle for his perceived tattling.

Further infuriated, Kyle ignores Cartman's apology and goes to Cartman's house, breaking his possessions in retaliation. When Kyle threatens to break Cartman's Xbox 360, Cartman pleads with him, telling Kyle that he has done research that led him to conclude that Magic Johnson's longevity since developing AIDS may lead to a possible cure. Cartman and Kyle travel to Johnson's house and tell him of their discovery. Though he is sympathetic, Johnson is unsure of how he can help. Upon investigation, Kyle and Cartman find that Johnson keeps his money in his bedroom since he does not trust banks. Johnson allows some of his money to be used in research for a cure, and scientists experiment with a concentrated dose of $180,000, which successfully neutralizes HIV particles. The discovery makes worldwide news, and an event is held in Kyle and Cartman's honor. After the emcee mistakenly addresses Kyle and Cartman as "two brave lovers," Kyle reneges on his promise not to break Cartman's Xbox, prompting the latter to run after him.

== Cultural references ==
During most of the episode, Cartman wears an outfit similar to one worn by Andrew Beckett, a fictional character portrayed by Tom Hanks in Philadelphia (1993).

== Reception ==
On its initial broadcast, the season premiere was watched by 3.07 million viewers in the United States.

The episode received generally mixed reviews with the consensus being that the episode "runs out of steam". Travis Fickett of IGN gave the episode a score of 7.2 out of 10 stating "It's a bit like 'South Park by the numbers,' as opposed to being truly inspired and insightful as the show's best episodes tend to be." Brad Trechak of TV Squad also gave a mixed review, saying that "Overall, a good show with some great one-liners. Sadly, it also had a weak ending." Fred of Tvoholic.com gave the episode a very positive review, praising the episode's message about AIDS.

== Home release ==
"Tonsil Trouble", along with the thirteen other episodes from South Park's twelfth season, were released on a three-disc DVD set and two-disc Blu-ray set in the United States on March 10, 2009. The sets included brief audio commentaries by Parker and Stone for each episode, a collection of deleted scenes, and two special mini-features, The Making of 'Major Boobage and Six Days to South Park.

The episode is also included on the two-disc DVD collection The Cult of Cartman.
