= Ginger Kids =

- South Park episode
- Episode no.: Season 9 Episode 11
- Directed by: Trey Parker
- Written by: Trey Parker
- Production code: 911
- Original air date: November 9, 2005

Episode chronology
← Previous "Follow That Egg!"	Next → "Trapped in the Closet"
- South Park season 9

"Ginger Kids" is the eleventh episode in the ninth season of the American animated television series South Park. The 136th episode of the series overall, it first aired on Comedy Central in the United States on November 9, 2005. In the episode, soon after Eric Cartman sparks a wave of prejudice against ginger kids that spreads throughout South Park Elementary, he is led to think he has contracted a mysterious and sudden onset of "gingervitis" (in actuality, Stan Marsh and Kyle Broflovski use skin bleach, hair dye, and henna, to transform him into a ginger kid in his sleep, in retribution for his dehumanization of ginger kids). To stop being ridiculed for his fake red hair, light skin and freckles, he rallies all the ginger kids everywhere to fight against the persecution and rise up to become the master race he believes they are intended to be.

The episode was written and directed by series co-creator Trey Parker. It caused controversy after its premise was misunderstood by people who acted violently against gingers.

== Plot ==
For a class presentation, Eric Cartman discusses "gingers": people with red hair, freckles, and pale skin due to an alleged disease called "Gingervitis" (named after Gingivitis). He describes them as being disgusting, inhuman, unable to survive in sunlight, and having no souls. Kyle Broflovski, who labels Cartman's presentation as a hate speech, points out that he too has red hair, to which Cartman points out that a second class of redheads, the "daywalkers" exist, who have red hair but not pale skin and freckles.

In an attempt to prove Cartman wrong, Kyle he decides to offer a rebuttal to Cartman's presentation: arguing that being a "ginger kid" is an inheritable trait. To prove this, Kyle and Stan Marsh visit a family who have redheaded children. To their shock, the non-Ginger parents of the Ginger kids, who each carry a recessive gene that has caused them to have Ginger kids, possess the same prejudice towards Ginger kids as Cartman. The father of the Ginger kids informs Kyle that marrying an Asian woman ensures that the recessive gene is not passed down, and mentions a friend who is marrying a Japanese woman for that reason. When Kyle makes his presentation, Cartman stands up for his claims and uses Biblical references, alleging that Judas Iscariot was a Ginger. As a result, Cartman's speech causes a newfound prejudice towards Ginger kids in the school. The gingers are treated as outcasts and forced to eat in the hallway rather than the cafeteria. Stan, Kyle, and Kenny McCormick agree that they need to teach Cartman a lesson.

At night, the three sneak into Cartman's room and use skin bleach to make his skin pale, dye his hair red, and put Henna tattoos of freckles on his face. Cartman wakes up in the morning to discover that he now has the disease "gingervitis" and has become a Ginger himself. Cartman is taken to the doctor, who turns out to be prejudiced himself and soon insults him, even suggesting that Ms. Cartman have him euthanized, which she considers. At school, Cartman is laughed at by Butters Stotch, and faces discrimination from the very people he himself convinced to despise Gingers. He is forced to join the gingers in eating in the hallway despite his attempts to convince them that he is still who he was. In response to this, Cartman establishes the "Ginger Separatist Movement" to promote the better aspects of being ginger.

Initially peaceful, Cartman's movement quickly becomes violent and Nazi-esque in tone, arguing that Gingers are a "great race", though when he tries to name a successful "ginger", the gingers are forced to simply declare themselves as being like "Ron Howard… and others." He and his organization start holding protests, including beating up a brunette who played Little Orphan Annie, for playing a redhead but not actually being one. Eventually, Cartman convinces the Ginger kids to decide to kill all the town's non-gingers by telling them "The only way to fight hate… is with MORE hate!"

An hour before dawn, the boys decide to sneak into Cartman's room and change him back to his original appearance. However, on their way over to his house, Ginger kids start to creep out of seemingly nowhere and follow them. At first, though terrified, the boys try to ignore them and decide to go home. Kenny is suddenly snatched away, prompting Kyle and Stan to break into a run. Meanwhile, children across the town are abducted from their homes by the Ginger kids. Eventually, Stan and Kyle are the only ones left. They lock themselves in a barn for protection but the Ginger kids break in and capture them both.

All the non-gingers are taken to the Sunset Room at the Airport Hilton Hotel, complete with a lava pit and refreshment buffet. They are all imprisoned in cages and will be chosen for sacrifice one by one.

"Daywalker" Kyle is chosen as the first. Cartman states a "half-ginger" is much worse than one with no such trait. However, he asks that before he dies, he say something private to Cartman. Kyle whispers in Cartman's ear that he is not in fact a "ginger". Now thinking only of self-preservation, he realizes that if his own cult were to learn of his true physical identity he too would die with every other non-"ginger kid" of the town. Cartman pretends to have had an epiphany that everyone should live in harmony and peace since Kyle's speech, then gets everyone to sing a song about how the different races should live together in peace. As the non-gingers are freed, an annoyed Kyle calls Cartman a "manipulative asshole" for his hypocrisy. Cartman gleefully responds "Yes, but I'm not going to die".

== Production ==
On the DVD commentary for "Ginger Kids", Trey Parker and Matt Stone said that they had wanted to do an episode about ginger kids for a long time, though did not initially know what to do for it. Parker and Stone were inspired to create the episode by a billboard that they saw in England while promoting the show. The billboard read "Only you can prevent ginger" and had a picture of a ginger girl. Parker and Stone did a lot of research to ensure that there was some truth to the whole story, rather than it being purely fictional.

The fact that Kyle has red hair introduced some difficulties during production. Parker and Stone felt that they needed to distinguish Kyle from the ginger kids because the character does not associate with them. Also, it had already been established that Kyle did indeed have red hair, thus making it more necessary to give an explanation as to why he was not like the other gingers. They eventually settled on the idea that there were "true" gingers, like the ones Cartman starts associating with, and "daywalkers", people like Kyle with red hair but no freckles or light skin.

In the episode, a man tells Stan and Kyle "If you really don't want to have ginger kids, marry an Asian woman. Asians don't carry the recessive gene. I know a guy who's marrying a Japanese woman very soon for just that reason". This is an intentional reference to Parker doing the same thing in real life. He once had a girlfriend whose mother had red hair, and ended the relationship to avoid having redheaded children, and even admitted to harboring what he described as racial prejudice against gingers. He later married Emma Sugiyama, a Japanese woman.

== Controversy ==
Ginger Kids supposedly inspired the infamous "National Kick a Ginger Day" event, of which three incidents involving the event and the episode gained notoriety. The event started out as a Facebook group or event in 2008 with a target date of November 20 and attracted members from Canada and the United States, eventually extending as far as the United Kingdom and Ireland.

In line with the starting date, the first incidents of Kick a Ginger Day took place on the same date in the same year across Canada and the United States. Several students with red hair were assaulted by other students. A police spokeswoman for the Royal Canadian Mounted Police named the incident as a hate crime.

In 2010, YouTuber Michael Kittrell, also known as CopperCab, uploaded a video referring to the episode titled "GINGERS DO HAVE SOULS!!" that went viral. South Park later parodied the video in their promotion for Season 14.

A second Kick a Ginger Day incident happened in 2013 at Wingfield Academy in Rotherham, Yorkshire, where red-headed students faced discrimination based on their hair-color. Parents of the discriminated students launched a Facebook group protesting the offending students in an attempt to end the bullying. Many parents were enraged by the incident, resulting in some of them fetching their children during the school hours out of fear of them being potential targets. School staff "strongly reprimanded" the offending students. A school spokesperson declared the incidents "deplorable acts" and stated that the entire institution was warned that students who continued such discrimination would also be punished.

The third incident happened in Massachusetts in 2015 where students with red hair also suffered the same fate, with some injured and bleeding. Disciplinary hearings and tolerance seminars were conducted.

Singer Ed Sheeran claims the episode was the start of noticeable discrimination against red hair in America, despite people with ginger hair being made fun of for decades prior to this.
