= Roid rage =

Side effect of anabolic steroid use

- Symptoms: Aggression, violent tendencies, emotional dysregulation (anxiety, depression), psychosis
- Treatment: Limiting anabolic steroid use, therapy, antipsychotics

Roid rage (also known as steroid rage) is a side effect of the use of anabolic steroids which is described as dramatic mood swings, increased feelings of hostility, impaired judgment, and increased levels of aggression. The term "roid rage" became popular in the 1980s.

== Cause ==
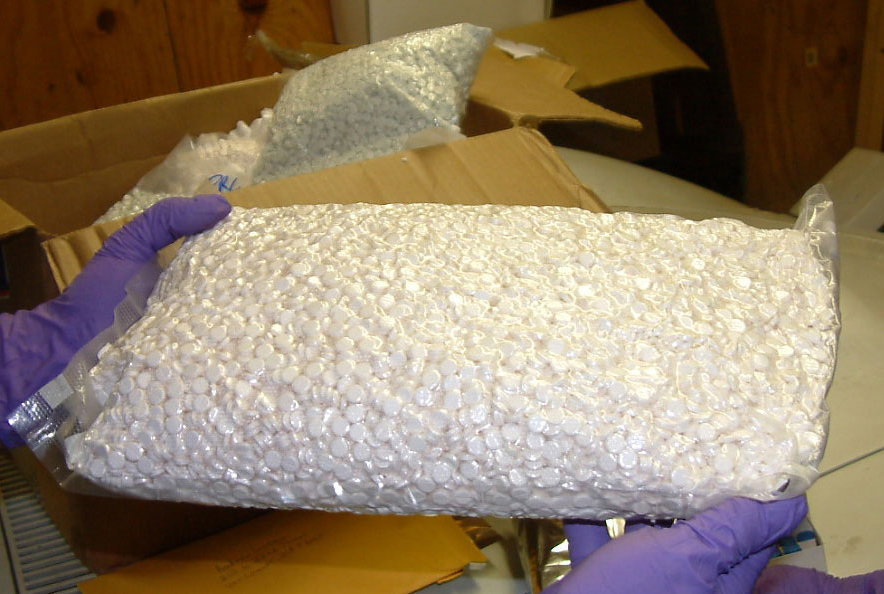
Illegal anabolic steroids from a raid by the Drug Enforcement Administration

After supraphysiological use of anabolic-androgenic steroid which normally consists of long-term uncontrolled use of anabolic steroids (i.e. several injections over a period of time) roid rage can take place, which includes aggression and emotional dysregulation which can lead to depression and paranoia. Use of steroids like corticosteroid to treat pains can cause steroid induced psychotic episodes which include racing thoughts, anger, agitation, pressured hyperverbal speech and paranoia.

== Effects ==
The effects of roid rage, which is not only seen in humans who take large doses of anabolic steroids but also when the same or even lower doses are administered to animals like lab rats, include the heavy increase in aggression and the fight-or-flight response. This was shown in a study of lab rats where when the nucleus accumbens and medial prefrontal cortex of a group of lab rats who were administered anabolic steroids showed no difference in tyrosine hydroxylase compared to regular lab rats but the caudate putamen, a brain area important for behavioral inhibition, motor control and habit learning, showed a significant decrease in tyrosine hydroxylase due to the testosterone. Indecisiveness is linked to changes in the mesocorticolimbic dopamine system with anabolic steroids having an affect dopamine function in mesocorticolimbic circuitry. It is not understood how this specifically affects decision making exactly. This indecisiveness is shown in lab rats which then turns into aggression, i.e. roid rage. Heavy signs of anxiety, mania, and paranoia were also present when "roid rage" becomes more present in the person taking in the anabolic steroids. Psychopathy is heavily increased if a person has underlying disorders for it when roid rage is present, where research shows the connection between substance misuse/abuse of anabolic steroids may lead to violence, repeated imprisonment, and disrespect for authority.

Effects of roid rage have chances to be greatly increased in aggression and impulsiveness if the abuser of anabolic steroids has any underlying personality disorders such as borderline personality disorder. Heavy use of anabolic steroids with roid rage can cause heavy distress as well depending on how long the steroids have been abused.

During puberty (in adolescent males) the intake of anabolic steroids can alter mood and personality causing a heavier roid rage that can impact them for a long-term time range. Due to puberty being a sensitive time period with hormones, anabolic steroids can cause a shift on testosterone production and induce unprovoked aggression whether the person may or may not still be using anabolic steroids. This may lead to extreme violent tendencies even after a year of drug absence, which is more present in adolescents and young adults, anabolic steroids are linked directly to the heightened factor of violent tendencies.

After tests were done comparing the use of methyltestosterone and stanozolol (both compounds of anabolic steroids) on castrated lab rats, both showed levels of heightened aggression, which suggests that human males who have undergone testicular removal can still be affected by roid rage.

=== Violence ===
When a person is experiencing roid rage and increased levels of aggression, they may become easily provokable and be prone to commit violent assaults. Many times when a person has abused anabolic steroids and commits violent crimes, they do not maintain the same levels of judgement to their actions, which may lead to aggravated murders. The abuse of other drugs can lead to a worsening effects of aggression and violence that a person may commit.

According to anecdotal reports, wives and girlfriends of athletes who take anabolic steroids face violence when the users of anabolic steroids continue to use them; this includes verbal abuse and physical domestic abuse.

== Treatment ==
Certain drugs that minimise the amount of oestrogen created as the anabolic steroids break down could help lessen the aggression. Anabolic steroid users can go into a psychosis when roid rage is induced, and even start experiencing suicidal ideation, some antipsychotic medications, such as haloperidol, have been used extensively to treat the psychosis induced roid rage, evidence also exists to support second-generation antipsychotics, lithium, selective serotonin reuptake inhibitors, tricyclic antidepressants (TCAs), and select antiepileptic drugs, including carbamazepine as well as valproic acid and its derivatives.

== In popular culture ==
In a season 8 episode of South Park, "Up the Down Steroid", the character Jimmy goes into a roid rage after use of anabolic steroids.

In a season 7 episode of Family Guy, "Stew-Roids", the character Stewie Griffin develops roid rage after his father Peter Griffin gives him steroids in order to make him stronger at the gym.
