= Follow That Egg! =

- South Park episode
- Episode no.: Season 9 Episode 10
- Directed by: Trey Parker
- Written by: Trey Parker
- Production code: 910
- Original air date: November 2, 2005

Guest appearance
- John Hansen as Mr. Slave

Episode chronology
← Previous "Marjorine"	Next → "Ginger Kids"
- South Park season 9

"Follow That Egg!" is the tenth episode in the ninth season of the American animated television series South Park. The 135th overall episode, it originally aired on Comedy Central in the United States on November 2, 2005.

In the episode, Mrs. Garrison tries reuniting with her ex-boyfriend Mr. Slave, but finds out that he is going to marry Big Gay Al after the governor of Colorado legalizes same-sex marriage in the state. Garrison, furious, goes to the governor and tries to prevent him from passing the gay marriage law.

Meanwhile, Stan thinks his ex-girlfriend, Wendy, is dating Kyle. He gets agitated and attempts to ignore him.

== Plot ==
Mrs. Garrison pairs off the kids in her class and assigns them to care for eggs as if they were babies to teach parenting responsibility. Stan is worried about getting paired with his ex-girlfriend Wendy, whom he has not spoken to since their breakup. However, Wendy is assigned to Kyle while Stan is paired with Bebe. The assignments cause tension among the students, as Stan begins suspecting Kyle is spying on Wendy while Bebe is angry at Stan's indifference to their egg.

Meanwhile, Mrs. Garrison is reminded of her ex-boyfriend Mr. Slave, who broke up with her after her sex change operation. Garrison attempts to take Mr. Slave back, only to learn that he and Big Gay Al are going to get married as soon as the governor of Colorado legalizes same-sex marriage. Consequently, she becomes extremely jealous and tries to stop the marriage.

Garrison rallies a crowd of people to petition against same-sex marriage and, upon realizing the governor won't veto the bill without proof that gays don't have the skills necessary to raise a family, makes plans for the final egg check to be in front of the governor's office and alters the pairs so that Stan and Kyle are the 'same-sex couple'. However, when it seems that the two are able to raise the egg properly, Garrison hires an assassin named Jakartha to destroy the egg to make sure Stan and Kyle's egg is broken when they present it, which he appears to do.

Kyle comes over to Stan's house and Stan tells him to just go be with Wendy, but Kyle admits he never had any feelings for Wendy and he would never like her, and he just wanted an A on the project. Kyle then reveals that he feared Stan's jealousy would interfere with his parenting abilities and so gave Stan a fake egg while he kept and saved the real one. The two boys reconcile and rush to the governor's office in a taxi, with Kyle calling Mrs. Garrison and telling her their egg is fine and that they are on their way. Horrified, Garrison demands that Jakartha destroys the egg before it reaches the podium. Jakartha tries to shoot the egg and set bombs to blow it up. Stan and Kyle avoid the attacks and reach the podium weary and hurt. The governor inspects the egg and, upon seeing that it is undamaged, announces that same-sex marriage is now legal in Colorado, greatly horrifying Mrs. Garrison and confusing the boys about the entirety of what happened.

The episode concludes with Mr. Slave and Big Gay Al marrying. Randy informs that he's proud of the boys for helping spread gay marriage rights, though they have no idea what he meant by that. Wendy then shows up and informs Stan that she's impressed that he'd be a good parent, but Stan informs her that he no longer cares about what she thinks of him, leaving Wendy heartbroken.

== Reception ==
Alexander Stevenson of NewNowNext.com mentioned the episode (along with other episodes about homosexuality) and claimed it was "A Milestone in Gay Visibility".
