= Eric Cartman =

Fictional character in South Park

- South Park character
- First appearance: Jesus vs. Frosty (1992, short)
- Created by: Trey Parker; Matt Stone
- Designed by: Trey Parker; Matt Stone
- Voiced by: Trey Parker

In-universe information
- Full name: Eric Theodore Cartman
- Alias: The Coon
- Gender: Male
- Occupation: Student; Rabbi (South Park: Post COVID); Unemployed (revised timeline in South Park: Post COVID: The Return of COVID)
- Family: Liane Cartman (mother); Jack Tenorman (father); Scott Tenorman (half-brother)
- Spouse: Yentl Cartman (alternate future wife)
- Significant other: Heidi Turner (ex-girlfriend)
- Children: Menorah Cartman (alternate future daughter); Moisha Cartman (alternate future son); Hackelm Cartman (alternate future son)
- Nationality: American
- Residence: South Park, Colorado, United States

Eric Theodore Cartman, commonly referred to by just his surname, is a fictional character in the adult animated sitcom South Park, created by Trey Parker and Matt Stone. He is voiced by Parker, and is one of the series' four main characters, alongside Stan Marsh, Kyle Broflovski, and Kenny McCormick. He first appeared with the name Kenny in the short film The Spirit of Christmas (1992), and later appeared in the 1995 film of the same title before debuting in "Cartman Gets an Anal Probe", the first episode of the series, on August 13, 1997.

Cartman is an elementary school student who lives with his single mother, Liane, in the eponymous Colorado town. Cartman is principally characterized by his obesity, his amorality, and his bigoted and especially antisemitic disposition, being described by Parker and Stone as "a little Archie Bunker". In later seasons, particularly following the fifth season episode "Scott Tenorman Must Die" (in which he turns the titular Scott Tenorman's parents into chili, in order to feed it to him as revenge for bullying him), Cartman exhibits increasingly psychopathic and manipulative behavior. The latter is showcased through Cartman's various schemes, the majority of which fail either due to opposition from other characters or Cartman's own hubris, frequently leaving Cartman in complete humiliation.

Cartman is widely considered to be the most popular South Park character, one of the most influential fictional characters of all time, and an American cultural icon. Parker and Stone have stated that he is their favorite character, and the one with whom they most identify. South Park has received both praise and criticism for Cartman's transgressive behavior.

== Role in South Park ==
Cartman attends South Park Elementary as part of Mr. Garrison's class. During the first 58 episodes, he and his classmates were in the third grade, before transitioning to the fourth grade in the fourth season episode of the same name. He is the only child of Liane Cartman, a promiscuous single mother. In the episode "Cartman's Mom Is Still a Dirty Slut", Liane is said to be intersex, being both Eric's mother and father. This is later revealed to be an elaborate ruse in the fourteenth-season episode "200". In the following episode, "201", it is revealed that Cartman's true biological father is Jack Tenorman, a former player for the Denver Broncos whom he arranged to have killed in "Scott Tenorman Must Die". This establishes Scott Tenorman, Jack's son, as Cartman's half-brother.

Cartman is distinguished from most of the other children by a wider physical appearance, and is subject to ridicule from others for his obesity. He is most commonly portrayed as an antagonist, with most of his actions driving the events of many episodes. Cartman is alienated by the majority of the other children for his strong amorality, but they are occasionally influenced by his manipulation.

Although Cartman has shared an enmity with Kenny, Stan, and Kyle, his rivalry with the latter two has progressed significantly during the show's run, with Cartman routinely exposing them to physical endangerment. Cartman, a staunch antisemite, reflects most of his hatred towards Kyle, a Jewish boy, such as deliberately infecting him with HIV ("Tonsil Trouble"). Kyle occasionally exhibits similar behavior in such episodes as "Fatbeard", wherein Kyle encourages Cartman to travel to Somalia, hoping he will be killed.

His rivalry with the other characters stems from opposition with their personalities. Where Kyle is restrained by firm morals, Cartman indulges in sadistic hedonism. He revealed that he hated Kenny the most in the episode "Jakovasaurs" and has, on numerous occasions, made fun of him for being poor. In "Kenny Dies", Cartman takes advantage of his declining health to get a ban on stem cell research lifted in order to construct his own Shakey's Pizza restaurant out of fetus stem cells. However, Cartman also implies that Kenny is his best friend, making their relationship unclear.

Kyle is sometimes an enthusiastic participant in Cartman's schemes and Cartman is sometimes seen treating Kyle well, although this is generally to put aside their hatred momentarily for a common goal or for manipulation. Parker and Stone have compared the relationship to that between Archie Bunker and Michael Stivic on All in the Family. Kyle has a tendency to make what he thinks are safe bets with Cartman, often losing these bets when the improbable actions promised by Cartman are accomplished. Cartman's motivation in this regard is not only monetary gain, but an obsession with beating Kyle, a fixation that ultimately plays a major part in a subplot to the three-part "Imaginationland". This obsession has been shown to overshadow other goals Cartman wishes to achieve. Cartman has a high sadistic streak towards Kyle, and has repeatedly expressed desire in seeing him suffer, often to extremes. In "You're Getting Old", it is suggested that Kyle and Cartman may be developing a genuine friendship, possibly due to the void left by Stan's apparent departure. This relationship ends in "Ass Burgers", however, due to Kyle finding out Cartman was producing his hamburgers by shoving them inside his rectum. Cartman's resentment of Stan is at times reserved for when Cartman actively proclaims his hatred for both Stan and Kyle as a duo, and his contempt for Stan as an individual is usually due to his annoyance with Stan's sensitivity, affection for animals, and relationship with Wendy Testaburger.

Despite being intolerant of other cultures, Cartman displays an aptitude for learning foreign languages. He knows German, and once uses this knowledge to impersonate Adolf Hitler while promoting the extermination of Jews to an oblivious audience that did not speak German, and in interactions with Mexican laborers, such as the episode "My Future Self n' Me", seems to speak at least conversational Spanish. This is in service of a running joke in which Cartman displays incredible aptitude at quickly learning almost any topic in service of his schemes, despite being an awful student in a school environment and displaying extreme ignorance about subjects that do not immediately interest him (although this is partially due to Mr. Garrison failing to teach legitimate school subjects most of the time and focusing his teachings instead on television series and celebrities).

Conversely, in "Major Boobage", Cartman shelters the town's cats when they are outlawed.

Cartman will use an awkward pause during a conversation as an opportunity to casually remind Kenny that he hates him. Cartman's mischievous treatment of Butters, and the relationship the duo shares, has received significant focus in the more recent seasons of the series. This reflects Parker's interest, as the scenes between the two are the ones he most enjoys writing.

Several episodes concern Cartman's greed and his get-rich-quick schemes, although his numerous attempts to attain wealth generally fail. His extreme disdain for hippies serves to satirize the counterculture of the 1960s and its influence in contemporary society, reflecting Parker's real-life antipathy towards hippies. Though the role is customarily taken by Stan or Kyle, Cartman will occasionally be the one to reflect on the lessons learned during the course of an episode with a speech that often begins with "You know, I've learned something today...".

== Character ==
=== Creation and design ===
Cartman without his hat in How to Eat with Your Butt.

A precursor to Cartman first appeared in the first The Spirit of Christmas short, dubbed Jesus vs. Frosty, created by Parker and Stone in 1992 while they were students at the University of Colorado. In the short, the character resembling Cartman was named "Kenny", and a variation of the catchphrase "Oh my God, they killed Kenny!" was exclaimed when this character was killed by an evil snowman. The character was composed of construction paper cutouts and animated through the use of stop motion. When commissioned three years later by friend Brian Graden to create another short as a video Christmas card that he could send to friends, Parker and Stone created another similarly-animated The Spirit of Christmas short, dubbed Jesus vs. Santa. In this short, his character first appears as he does in the series, and is given the name "Cartman", while the character of Kenny appears as the character is depicted today and given Cartman's moniker from the previous short. Cartman next appeared on August 13, 1997, when South Park debuted on Comedy Central with the episode "Cartman Gets an Anal Probe".

In keeping with the show's animation style, Cartman is composed of simple geometrical shapes and primary colors. He is not offered the same free range of motion associated with hand-drawn characters; his character is mostly shown from one direction, and his movements intentionally jerky. Ever since the show's second episode, "Weight Gain 4000" (season one, 1997), Cartman, like all other characters on the show, has been animated with computer software, though he is portrayed to give the impression that the show still utilizes its original technique.

Cartman is usually depicted wearing winter attire which consists of a red coat, brown pants, yellow gloves/mittens, and a yellow-brimmed turquoise knit cap tapered with a yellow pom-pom. He has parted brown hair, and he is seen without his hat more often than the other characters with distinctive headwear. As he is overweight, his body is wider and his hands noticeably larger than those of the other children, and his head is more elliptical. An additional curved line on his lower face represents a double chin.

Parker adduced that he came up with the voice of Cartman while he and Stone were in film class, where they would speak in high-pitched childish voices, which was quite irksome to their film teachers. They would naturally reproduce these voices in the initial seasons of South Park. Although he had originally voiced Cartman without any computer manipulation, Parker now does so by speaking within his normal vocal range with a childlike inflection. The recorded audio is then edited with Pro Tools, and the pitch is altered to make the voice sound like that of a 10-year-old. Parker says to achieve the effect of Cartman's voice, he simply uses the same technique when voicing Stan while "adding a lot of fat to it".

=== Development ===
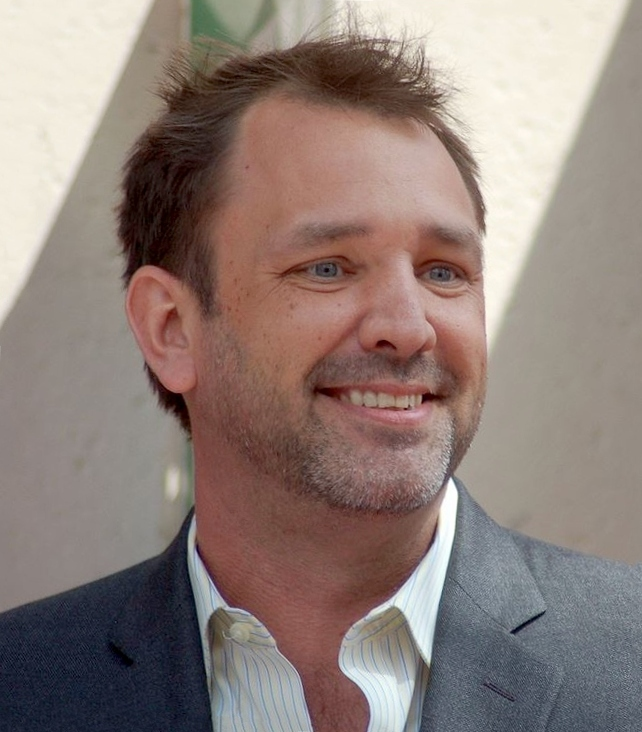
Cartman is voiced by series co-creator Trey Parker.

Cartman is partially named after and based on Matt Karpman, a high school classmate of Parker who remains a friend of both Parker and Stone. Cartman is also inspired to some degree by All in the Family patriarch Archie Bunker, who is himself inspired by Alf Garnett from Till Death Us Do Part, the British sitcom upon which All in the Family was based. Parker and Stone are reportedly big fans of All in the Family. They alleged in 2008 that creating Cartman as a "little eight-year-old fat kid" made it easier for the two to portray a Bunker-like character after the introduction of political correctness to late-20th century television. While developing the character, Parker noted that everyone either remembers "an annoying fat kid in their pasts", or "they were the annoying fat kid". Stone has observed that "kids are not nice, innocent, flower-loving little rainbow children ... they don't have any kind of social tact or etiquette, they're just complete little raging bastards".

In the season five (2001) episode "Scott Tenorman Must Die", Cartman is tricked into buying the pubic hair of a local ninth-grader named Scott Tenorman for $16.12. He then successfully executes an elaborate scheme to publicly humiliate Scott in front of his favorite band Radiohead, by getting Scott's parents killed and then tricking Scott into eating them. The show's writers debated during production of the episode whether the incident would be "a step too far, even for Cartman". Parker felt that the act could sufficiently be the culmination of Cartman's sociopathic behavior, and would "[set] a new bar" by portraying Cartman as being capable of performing anything short of murder. Fans reacted by ranking it as Cartman's "greatest moment" in a 2005 poll on Comedy Central's website. It is later revealed in the season fourteen episode "201" that Jack Tenorman, Scott's father, was a football player for the Denver Broncos who impregnated Cartman's mom, therefore making him Cartman's father too.

Parker and Stone, despite being the basis for Stan and Kyle, insist that Cartman is their favorite character, and the one with whom they identify the most.

=== Personality and traits ===
There's a big part of me that's Eric Cartman. He's both of our dark sides, the things we'd never say.

— Trey Parker

Cartman uses profanity (as do his friends) to provide a means for Parker and Stone to portray how they believe young boys really talk when they are alone. According to Parker, Cartman does not possess the "underlying sweetness" of the show's other child characters. Cartman is shown at times to be completely amoral and remorseless. Cartman, as with Stan Marsh and Kyle Broflovski, is amused by bodily functions and toilet humor, and his favorite television personalities are Terrance and Phillip, a Canadian duo whose comedy routines on their show-within-the-show revolve substantially around fart jokes.

Cartman is sensitive and in denial about his obesity. He often reasserts Liane's notion by exclaiming "I'm not fat, I'm big-boned!" and will just as often either threaten to bring harm to anyone who mocks his weight or curse them out in aggravation. He has also had people killed due to his insecurity; for example, after his psychiatrist mocked his weight, Cartman framed the man as a pedophile to his wife, causing her to commit suicide. He views himself as more mature than his fellow friends and classmates, and often grows impatient with their company; despite claiming to be more mature, he will often break down crying childishly and pathetically whenever he feels defeated. This often leads to loud arguments, which in earlier seasons typically end with Cartman peevishly saying "Screw you guys ... I'm going home!" and then leaving. In an action King's College philosophy professor David Kyle Johnson describes as "directed either toward accomplishing his own happiness or the unhappiness of others", Cartman often feigns actual friendship with his classmates when needing a favor. The lack of a true father figure in his life, and Liane's promiscuity and drug use have caused repressed psychological hardship in Cartman's life. As a parent, Liane often spoils Cartman, and is largely ineffectual as a disciplinarian. Cartman sometimes commands his mom to do tasks for him, but more often resorts to pleading with her in an ingratiating tone. When neither method works, he resorts to excessive and indecipherable whining, to which Liane usually succumbs. Parker has noted that this is the primary cause for Cartman's behavior, stating that Cartman is "just a product of his environment".

We always had this thing where Cartman's mother was so sweet—she was always so sweet to him and giving him whatever he wanted. And I don't know if it's worse in L.A. than most places in the country—I hope so—but [we've met] so many parents who were just so desperately trying to be friends to their kids. And it was the thing we really picked up on. And it was just like, 'These [people] are making these really evil kids'.
– Trey Parker, discussing Liane's role in shaping Cartman's personality in an interview with NPR

Cartman thrives on achieving ascendancy over others, and exerts his will by demagoguery and by demanding that others "Respect my authoritah!" Cartman has several times declared that his dream is getting "Ten million dollars", and that if he got it he would be "so happy". He has shown initiative in taking a businesslike approach to earning money, starting his own "hippie control" and "parental revenge" operations, as well as a Christian Rock and a boy band, a basketball team of crack babies (parody of the NCAA) and his own church.

Cartman's anti-Semitism, while mostly limited to mocking Kyle, culminates in the season eight episode "The Passion of the Jew". In the episode, Cartman, after watching The Passion of the Christ numerous times, deifies the film's director, Mel Gibson, and starts an official Gibson fan club, praising Gibson for "trying to express—through cinema—the horror and filthiness of the common Jew". Cartman's interpretation of the film influences him to dress up as Adolf Hitler and lead other fan club members (who are oblivious of Cartman's actual intentions) in a failed effort to engage in a systematic genocide of the Jews similar to that of the Final Solution. In the season 10 episode "Smug Alert!", Cartman anonymously saves Kyle's life in an effort to get him and his family to return to South Park from San Francisco, revealing that he craves the animosity shared between the two. Cartman later directs the "evil god" Cthulhu to destroy "most of the synagogues" during the season 14 episode "Coon vs. Coon and Friends".

Upon hearing his classmates tell him that they hold him in the lowest regard possible and that they could not possibly think any worse of him, a stubborn Cartman misinterprets this act as their attempt to make him feel better, and convinces himself that everyone thinks he is the "coolest kid in school". In the season 13 (2009) episode "Fishsticks", Cartman subconsciously believes that he helped in creating a joke that quickly becomes a nationwide sensation, despite the fact that the character Jimmy Valmer writes the joke without any assistance. Carlos Delgado of If Magazine noted this as "Cartman being so egotistical that he manipulates the past to serve his own purposes".

Though he is commonly portrayed as having a chauvinist disrespect for foreign cultures, Cartman is shown at least twice ("My Future Self n' Me" and "Pandemic") to be able to speak fluent Spanish (and German). Cartman attempts suicide in the episode "Sermon on the 'Mount", in response to what he perceives as the death of woke culture.

Throughout the series, Cartman is shown to harbour some same-sex desire, despite usually being homophobic. He frequently dresses up as a woman, such as when he cosplayed as Britney Spears and danced with a cutout of Justin Timberlake in "Awesom-O". In "Cartman Sucks", Cartman takes a picture of himself with Butters' penis in his mouth in order to humiliate him and call him gay. When the boys tell Cartman it makes him gay, Cartman is horrified and attempts to make Butters put Cartman's penis in his mouth to "cancel out". Cartman's homophobic beliefs seem to come partly from his mother and her religious interpretations. In "Big Gay Al's Big Gay Boat Ride", he states that his mother said "God hates gay people", and references Sodom and Gomorrah to justify this.

== Cultural impact ==
Cartman is a South Park fan favorite, and is often described as the most famous character from the series as well as having a significant influence on comedy and culture. With a headline to their online written version of a radio report, NPR declared Cartman as "America's Favorite Little $@#&*%". "Respect my authoritah!" and "Screw you guys ... I'm going home!" became catchphrases and, during the show's earlier seasons, were highly popular in the lexicon of viewers. His eccentric enunciation of "Hey!" was included in the 2002 edition of The Oxford Dictionary of Catchphrases. Stone has said that when fans recognize him or Parker, the fans will usually do their imitation of Cartman, or, in Parker's case, request that he do Cartman's voice.

In 2005, Comedy Central ran a three-night marathon of episodes showcasing what voters had deemed to be his "25 greatest moments". A two-disc DVD collection entitled "The Cult of Cartman", which Comedy Central described as "12 classic episodes with Cartman at his very worst!", was released in 2008.

In a 1999 poll conducted by NatWest Bank, eight and nine-year-old children in the United Kingdom voted Cartman as their favorite personality. This drew the concern of several parent councils who were expecting a character from a television show aimed at children to top the list, to which Stone responded by claiming the results of the poll were "upsetting to people who have an idyllic vision of what kids are like".

While some in the Jewish community have praised the show's depiction of Cartman holding an anti-Semitic attitude towards Kyle as a means of accurately portraying what it is like for a young Jew to have to endure prejudice, other Jews have blamed South Park and Cartman for having found themselves surrounded by "acceptable racism". On November 20, 2008, a Facebook group titled "National Kick a Ginger Day, are you going to do it?" surfaced, suggesting abuse towards redheads. Thousands of internet users signed up as a member of the group, and reports of a feared increase of bullying of red-headed students across Canada soon followed. The group's administrator, a 14-year-old from Vancouver Island, said the group was only intended as a joke, and apologized for the offense it caused. The group was inspired by the season nine (2005) episode "Ginger Kids", in which Cartman incites prejudice towards those with red hair, pale skin, and freckles, a group he calls "Gingers" and claims are inherently evil and without souls.

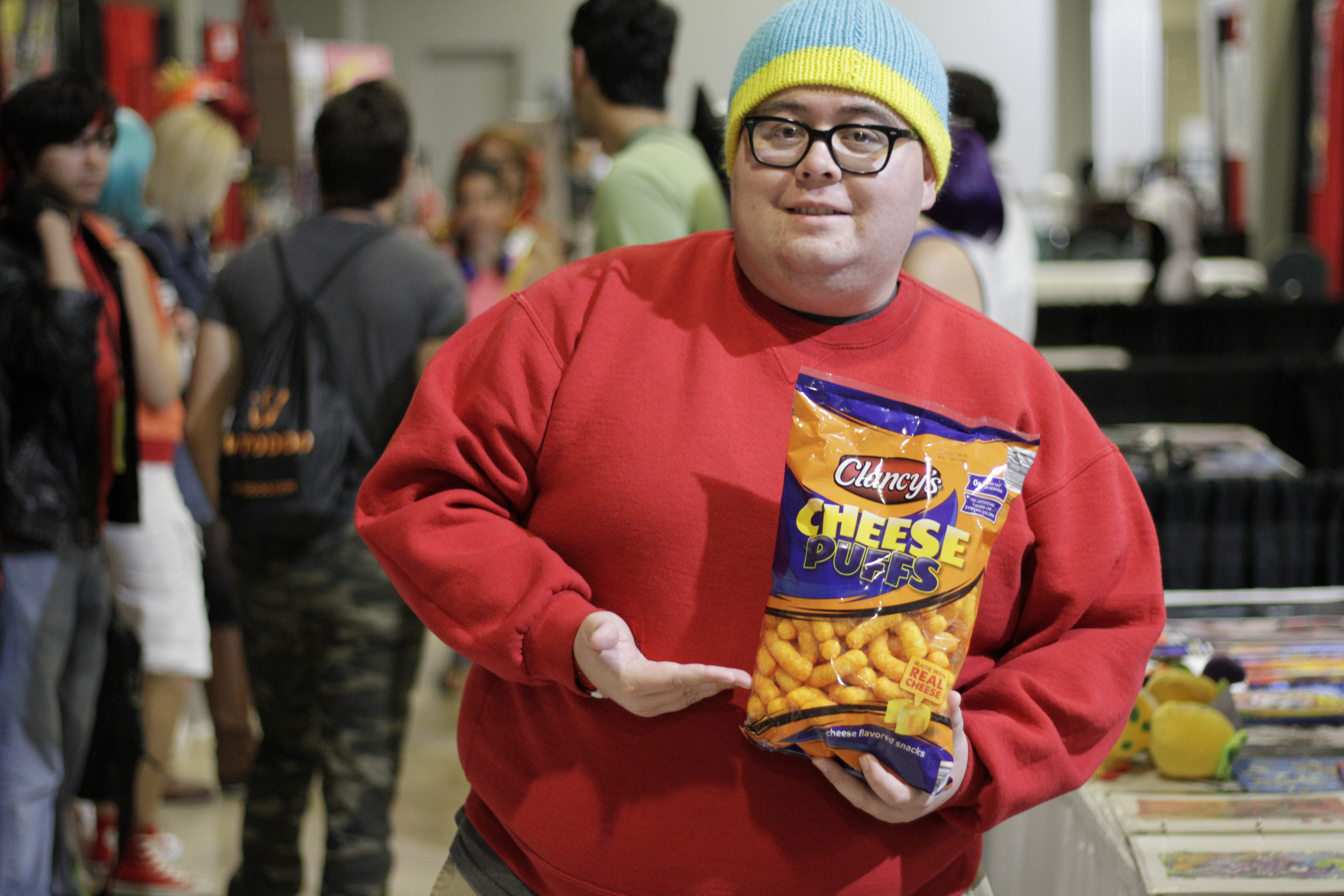
A cosplayer as Cartman at a convention

Other characters commonly express lessons learned from the antagonistic actions Cartman commonly provokes; this has resulted in these characters giving their opinions on issues such as hate crime legislation, civil liberties, excessive religious devotion, the stem cell controversy, anabolic steroid use, the "right to die" debate, and prejudice. In the season 10 (2006) episode "Cartoon Wars Part II", Cartman, planning to exploit the public's fear of terrorism, seeks to get the Fox television series Family Guy, a program he despises, permanently removed from the airwaves when Fox plans to air an episode despite its inclusion of a cartoon likeness of Muhammad. This leads Kyle to give a short speech about the ethics of censorship, which reiterates Parker and Stone's sentiments of "Either it's all okay, or none of it is" in regards to whether any subject should remain off-limits to satire. Both Cartman's commentary and the commentary resulting in response to his actions have been interpreted as statements Parker and Stone are attempting to make to the viewing public, and these opinions have been subject to much critical analysis in the media and literary world.

The book South Park and Philosophy: You Know, I Learned Something Today includes an essay in which Johnson uses Cartman's actions and behavior as examples when discussing the logical problem of moral evil, and another essay by College of Staten Island professor Mark D. White cited the season two (1998) episode "Chickenlover", in which Cartman is temporarily granted law enforcement powers, in its discussion regarding the command theory of law and what obligates a citizen to obey the law. Essays in the books South Park and Philosophy: Bigger, Longer, and More Penetrating, Blame Canada! South Park and Contemporary Culture, and Taking South Park Seriously have also analyzed Cartman's perspectives within the framework of popular philosophical, theological, political, and social concepts. Parker and Stone downplay the show's alignment with any particular political affiliation, and deny having a political agenda when creating an episode. In response to the focus on elements of satire in South Park, Parker has said that the main goal of the show is to portray Cartman and his friends as "kids just being kids" as a means of accurately showcasing "what it's like to be in [elementary school] in America".

=== Recognition ===
TV Guide ranked Cartman at number 10 on their 2002 list of the "Top 50 Greatest Cartoon Characters", 24th on TV Guide's "25 Greatest TV Villains", 198th on VH1's "200 Greatest Pop Culture Icons", and 19th on Bravo's "100 Greatest TV Characters" television special in 2004. When declaring him the second-scariest character on television (behind only Mr. Burns of The Simpsons) in 2005, MSNBC's Brian Bellmont described Cartman as a "bundle of pure, unadulterated evil all wrapped up in a fat—er, big-boned—cartoony package" who "takes a feral delight in his evildoing". In 2014, IGN ranked Cartman first place on their list of "The Top 25 South Park Characters", commenting that he was "the obvious choice" of number one and that "sometimes the obvious choice is also the right one". The website stated that despite Cartman being "one of the worst human beings in the history of fiction ... he's the most loathsome character we've ever loved." IGN concluded by calling him "the biggest contribution to the world of animated characters that South Park has made – and that's saying something." In 2020, Paste ranked Cartman as #17 of their "The 50 Best Cartoon Characters of All Time".

== In other media ==
- Cartman has a major role in South Park: Bigger, Longer & Uncut, the full-length film based on the series, and appeared on the film's soundtrack singing the same musical numbers performed in the movie. As a tribute to the Dead Parrot sketch, a short that features Cartman attempting to return a dead Kenny to a shop run by Kyle aired during a 1999 BBC television special commemorating the 30th anniversary of Monty Python's Flying Circus. Cartman is also featured in the documentary film The Aristocrats, telling his version of the film's titular joke to Stan, Kyle, and Kenny, and in "The Gauntlet", a short spoofing both Gladiator and Battlefield Earth that aired during the 2000 MTV Movie Awards.
- Cartman is a central character in South Park: Post COVID, the first television special made for Paramount+. In the special, which takes place 40 years after the events of the series, Cartman is depicted as having converted to Orthodox Judaism, becoming a rabbi with a wife and three children, much to the chagrin of Kyle.
- Cartman returns in the follow-up special South Park: Post COVID: The Return of COVID. In it, Cartman has thoroughly convinced his family that Kyle is out to break them apart on the grounds of being anti-Jewish (in reality, Kyle intends to go back in time to try and alter the events of the COVID outbreak and Cartman is concerned that this will cost him his family). In retaliation, Cartman organizes a rebellion group consisting of Butters, Clyde and Scott Malkinson with the sole purpose of going back in time and killing him. After a brief altercation with Kyle himself, Cartman changes his mind about the plan and kills an adult Clyde in the past, who volunteered to attempt to kill Kyle, allowing Stan and Kyle to help their younger selves save their friendship before the pandemic kicked off. In the now-altered future, Cartman is shown to be alcoholic, homeless, and bitter.
- For their 2007 Snakes & Arrows tour, the rock band Rush commissioned a short, video introduction for the song "Tom Sawyer". Cartman, dressed in a long wig to look like singer Geddy Lee, sings his own, personal, version of the song's lyrics prompting the usual outrage from Kyle. The video can be seen on the band's Snakes & Arrows concert video.
- In 2002, Cartman became the main protagonist of a series of promotional videos for the Los Angeles Kings of the NHL, which are played on the big-screen TVs inside of Staples Center where the character ridicules the mascots of rival teams and reacts to various aspects of the game.
- Short clips of Cartman introducing the starting lineup for the Colorado football team were featured during ABC's coverage of the 2007 match-up between Colorado and Nebraska.
- In 2008, Parker, as Cartman, gave answers to a Proust Questionnaire conducted by Julie Rovner of NPR.
- Parker performs as Cartman on tracks for Chef Aid: The South Park Album and Mr. Hankey's Christmas Classics. Cartman also appears in six South Park-related video games: In South Park, Cartman is controlled by the player through the first-person shooter mode who attempts to ward off enemies from terrorizing the town of South Park. In South Park: Chef's Luv Shack, a user has the option of playing as Cartman when participating in the game's several "minigames" based on other popular arcade games. In the racing game South Park Rally, a user can race as Cartman against other users playing as other characters, while choosing to place him in any of a variety of vehicles. In South Park Let's Go Tower Defense Play!, Cartman can be selected as a playable character used to establish a tower defense against the game's antagonists. In South Park: The Stick of Truth, Cartman is the leader of one of two tribes in South Park, at war over the Stick of Truth. He plays a similar role in this game's superhero themed sequel, South Park: The Fractured but Whole, where he leads the Coon & Friends team.
