= Jimmy Valmer =

Fictional character from South Park

- South Park character
- First appearance: "Cripple Fight" (2001)
- Created by: Trey Parker; Matt Stone
- Designed by: Trey Parker; Matt Stone
- Voiced by: Trey Parker

In-universe information
- Aliases: Jim; The Bard; Fastpass
- Gender: Male
- Occupation: Elementary school student, talk show host (future)
- Family: Ryan Valmer (father); Sarah Valmer (mother)
- Significant other: Nancy (girlfriend)
- Education: South Park Elementary
- Residence: South Park, Colorado United States

Jimmy Valmer (/ˈvɑːlmər/), formerly Jimmy Swanson, is a fictional character from the American animated television series South Park. He is voiced by Trey Parker. He is physically disabled, requiring forearm crutches in order to walk.

== Character biography ==
In season 7 episode 2 "Krazy Kripples", it is explicitly stated that both Jimmy and Timmy were born with their disabilities. In any case, hampered by his legs, which in many cases he appears not to be able to use, Jimmy primarily uses his crutches both as substitutes for his legs and sometimes even as extra (weaponized) extensions for his arms. He prefers to be called "handi-capable". Jimmy is able to speak coherently, and his various aspirations on several different levels of journalism over time also sometimes even makes him more articulate than any of the other children, though his speech is largely affected by his stuttering, and sometimes also his tendency to end some of his sentences with "..very much". He aspires to be a stand-up comedian, and is often featured performing his routines. His catchphrase during his routines is "Wow, what a terrific audience!". Jimmy is commonly seen with Craig Tucker, Clyde Donovan, and Tolkien Black as part of "Craig's Gang". In the show's Season 5 DVD commentary, the show's creators stated that Jimmy was originally intended to be from another town but at some unspecified point moved to South Park as the character started to be written into more episodes. Despite his disability, he is also shown to be an extremely accomplished drummer, performing with Stan Marsh's death metal group Crimson Dawn in the episode "Band in China".

In the 2021 special, set 40 years in the future, Jimmy has his own talk show named Late Night with Jimmy, à la Jimmy Kimmel Live!, he is referred to as "the king of woke comedy".

== History ==
Jimmy first appears in the season five (2001) episode "Cripple Fight", in which he moves to South Park from a neighboring town and antagonizes Timmy. Parker and Stone initially intended for this to be Jimmy's only appearance, but decided to include the character in subsequent episodes. Now portrayed as a South Park resident, student, and good friend of Timmy, Jimmy has been a recurring character ever since. Jimmy's parents had made fun of disabled children in high school, and believe that Jimmy's disability is a punishment from God. The season eight (2004) episode "Up the Down Steroid" ends with Jimmy addressing the issue of anabolic steroid use in athletic competitions, declaring it as "cheating" while suggesting that professional athletes who use steroids voluntarily reject the accolades and records attributed to them. The episode also reveals that Jimmy has a girlfriend named Nancy.

== Reception ==
Melanie McFarland of the Seattle Post-Intelligencer describes Jimmy and Timmy's capabilities and portrayal in the show as Parker and Stone declaring their opposition to political correctness as social restriction. When praising the show for both its depiction of Jimmy and Timmy and its coverage of disability-related issues, The Seattle Times columnist Jeff Shannon, a quadriplegic, describes Jimmy and Timmy as "goodwill ambassadors".
