= Raisins (South Park) =

- South Park episode
- Episode no.: Season 7 Episode 14
- Directed by: Trey Parker
- Written by: Trey Parker
- Production code: 714
- Original air date: December 10, 2003

Episode chronology
← Previous "Butt Out"	Next → "It's Christmas in Canada"
- South Park season 7

"Raisins" is the fourteenth episode of the seventh season of the American animated television series South Park, and the 110th episode of the series overall. It first aired on Comedy Central in the United States on December 10, 2003. In the episode, Wendy breaks up with Stan, causing him to spiral into a deep depression. The boys, in an attempt to make him feel better, take him to Raisins, a parody of American restaurant chain Hooters. Meanwhile, Butters becomes infatuated with a waitress at Raisins.

The episode was written by series co-creator Trey Parker. Though he and the show's writing team had the concept of Raisins, it took several days to fully develop its story. They were unable to begin work on the episode until six days before its airdate. Parker and co-creator Matt Stone based Stan's breakup on their memories of elementary school "relationships", and the episode's use of licensed music is also representative of their upbringing. "Raisins" is the first episode to include the Goth kids, secondary characters within the show's universe. Stan and Wendy would later reconcile their relationship four seasons later in "The List".

The episode received positive reviews from television critics. "Raisins" was released on DVD along with the rest of the seventh season in 2006.

== Plot ==
The boys are playing football at recess when Bebe suddenly tells Stan his girlfriend Wendy has decided to break up with him. Stan tells Bebe that he has not spoken to Wendy for weeks and also asks if he has done something wrong, to which Bebe replies that Wendy does not want to be with him anymore. Stan's friends are unconcerned and make fun of Bebe, but Stan falls into a deep depression and decides not to play football with them.

The boys take Stan to the restaurant Raisins—where all of the employees are young preteen girls wearing heavy make-up, and are all named after luxury car brands—hoping to cheer him up. Later, Stan asks Bebe for help to get Wendy back. Bebe tells Stan to play a Peter Gabriel song loudly outside her house. When doing this, Stan discovers Wendy has already begun a relationship with Token. When Stan refuses to attend P.E. class, he decides to socialize with the South Park Elementary's group of goth kids. He begins wearing dark clothes, consuming large amounts of coffee, and delving deeper into his sadness.

Meanwhile, Butters falls in love with a waitress at Raisins named Lexus, failing to see the insincerity of her interest in him. He obsesses over her and begins to spend all of his allowance at the restaurant. His parents, delighted that their son did not turn out gay, decide to come with Butters to meet his "girlfriend", but discover she has been using him for money. Though they explain this to him, Butters tells his parents off. He reveals he has plans to move in with Lexus, who bluntly tells him that she was never his girlfriend. Butters becomes depressed, and the goth kids invite him to join their clique. He refuses, noting that though he is upset, he is happy he can feel sadness, as it makes him feel more alive. Stan adopts Butters' point of view and emerges from his own depression. The next day, he rejoins his friends for football and tells Kyle he will handle his future problems in the right way, and insults Wendy and Token.

== Production ==
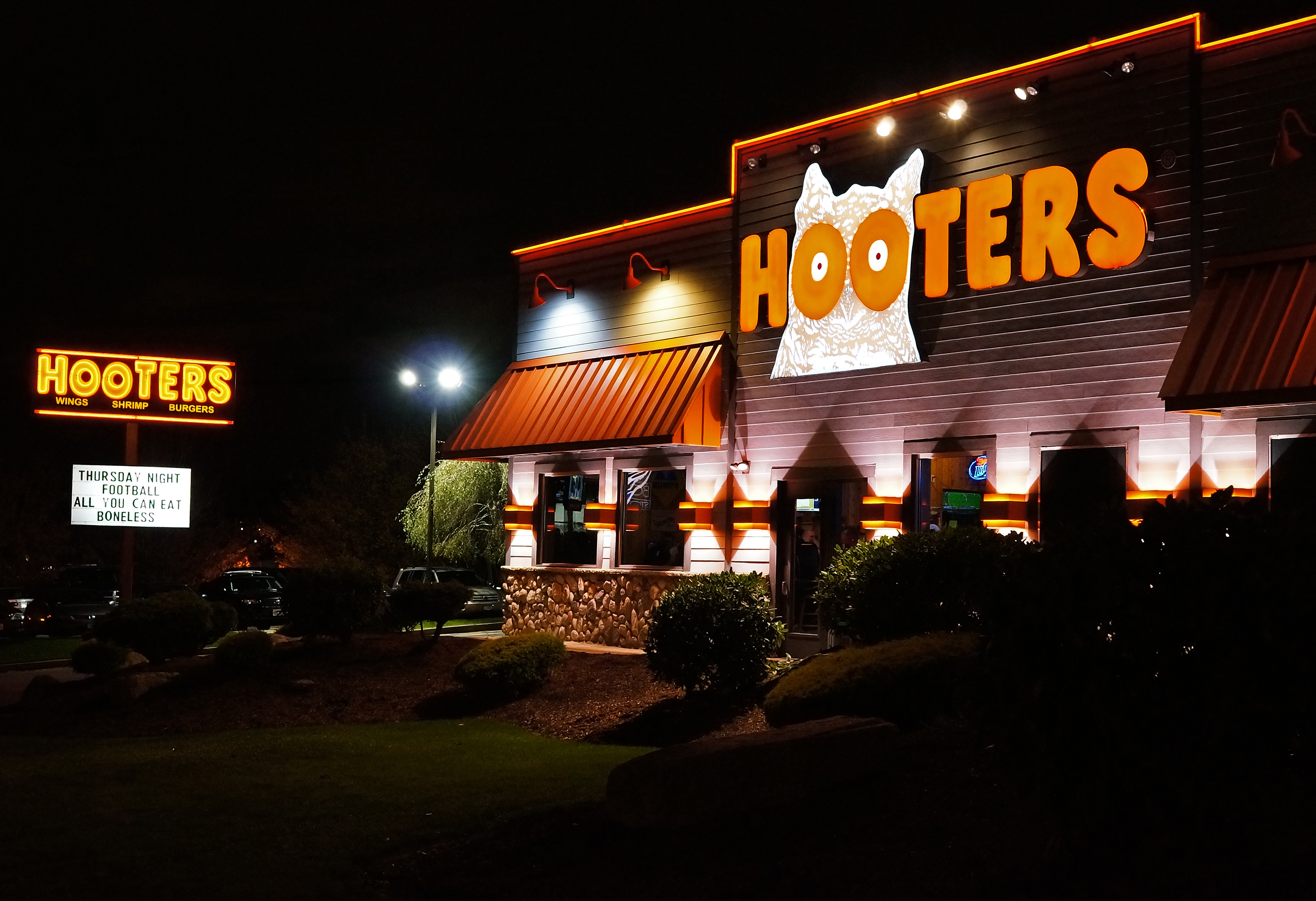
The episode prominently parodies the American restaurant chain Hooters

"Raisins" was written and directed by series co-creator Trey Parker. Like many South Park episodes, it was produced in the week preceding its broadcast. The writers spent the first day of their production week, Thursday, without any ideas. They convened at Parker's home the following day. Parker noted in the episode's commentary that the crew at South Park Studios began getting nervous, as a day's worth of animation work had been lost. They had developed the idea of Raisins—a parody of the restaurant chain Hooters but designed for younger girls—but were unable to build an episode around it. The team discussed that men often visit Hooters with friends to cheer them up following a breakup. This led to the concept of Wendy, one of the show's secondary characters, breaking up with main character Stan. Co-creator Matt Stone noted the way in which Stan is broken up with in the episode is the way he remembered kids in elementary school going about relationships.

The episode introduces several recurring characters, among them the Raisins girls and the Goth kids. Parker wrote in the script that the character of Kyle offhandedly mentions the "Goth kids" in one line, but decided it would be fun to create new characters for them. The concept of the Goth kids drinking coffee at Benny's (a spoof of American-based diner chain Denny's) comes from Stone's own experiences. He remembered the Goth kids from his adolescence hanging out at his local Perkins drinking endless cups of coffee for hours at a time. Parker's favorite moment in the episode involves the character Jimmy, who has a speech impediment, telling Wendy that she is a "continuing source of inspiration" for Stan but stuttering on the first syllable, causing it to be misheard as "cunt". Parker remembered the writers spent time attempting to come up with words they could use in that scenario; Stone dubbed the end result a "reach of a joke."

== Cultural references ==
The episode plays "Don't Know What You Got (Till It's Gone)" by Cinderella when Wendy breaks up with Stan. Parker remembered he and the crew were adamant that they license that particular song, as they considered it "perfect" for that moment. The episode further uses "Living in America" by James Brown, "All Out of Love" by Air Supply, "Shock the Monkey" by Peter Gabriel, and "YMCA" by Village People. Parker and Stone noted that these songs were culled from their experiences growing up in the 1970s and 80s.

In the episode, Bebe tells Stan to try and win Wendy back by standing outside her window, holding up a boom box, and playing Peter Gabriel; a reference to the John Cusack film Say Anything.... However instead of playing "In Your Eyes," like in the movie, Stan plays "Shock the Monkey".

== Reception ==
Tim Cain of the Herald & Review considered Butters' speech at the episode's conclusion "one of the most heartful and sincere soliloquies in the show's history", despite it not strictly being a soliloquy.

== Home release ==
"Raisins", along with the thirteen other episodes from South Park's seventh season, were released on a three-disc DVD set in the United States on March 26, 2006. The sets included brief audio commentaries by Parker and Stone for each episode. The episode was also released on the two-disc DVD collection A Little Box of Butters.
