= The Passion of the Jew =

- South Park episode
- Episode no.: Season 8 Episode 3
- Directed by: Trey Parker
- Written by: Trey Parker
- Production code: 804
- Original air date: March 31, 2004

Episode chronology
← Previous "Up the Down Steroid"	Next → "You Got F'd in the A"
- South Park season 8

"The Passion of the Jew" is the third episode of the eighth season and the 115th overall episode of the American animated series South Park, originally broadcast on Comedy Central on March 31, 2004. Going by production order, it is the fourth episode of Season 8 instead of the third. The episode was written and directed by Trey Parker, who, along with fellow series co-creator Matt Stone, voiced most of the characters in the episode. "The Passion of the Jew" is a satirical critique of the media discourse and controversy surrounding Mel Gibson's 2004 film, The Passion of the Christ.

In the episode, Kyle finally sees the blockbuster movie The Passion of the Christ and admits that Cartman has been right about the Jewish people all along. After Stan and Kenny see and hate the film, they angrily pursue Mel Gibson to get their money back. Cartman then uses the film's antisemitic message as an excuse to start his own neo-Nazi movement disguised as a fan club for the movie.

== Plot ==
The boys are playing Star Trek in Cartman's mother's new minivan and, as usual, the antisemitic Cartman insults Kyle's Jewish heritage. Cartman dares Kyle to watch The Passion of the Christ, the blockbuster film which Cartman cites as proof that everybody hates the Jews, he states that he saw the film 34 times and states there is one scene in the film where the Jews had a chance to save Jesus, but they let Barabbas go free instead and laughed about it. Kyle sees the film and is horrified by its violent depiction of how Jesus was tortured and crucified. He feels intense guilt and has nightmares in which he and other Jews laugh while killing Jesus. He tells Cartman that he was "right all along" about the Jews; overjoyed, Cartman prays to a poster of The Passion's director Mel Gibson and vows to dedicate his life to promoting the film and organize the masses to do his "bidding". Meanwhile, Stan and Kenny also see The Passion and hate it. Declaring it a "snuff film", they demand their eighteen dollars back from the theater, but are told that they can only get their money back from Gibson himself.

Attempting to contact Gibson, Stan and Kenny telephone the head of the Mel Gibson Fan Club — Cartman, who yells at them for disliking the film, but lets slip that Gibson lives in Malibu. Stan and Kenny make their way there. Meanwhile, Cartman dresses in a brown Hitler-esque uniform, practicing by speaking to the mirror: "Töten sie die Juden. Wir können nicht still stehen bis sie alle tot sind" ("Kill the Jews. We can't stand still until they're all dead") then hosts a fan club meeting in his backyard. The attendees have gathered to celebrate The Passion, which they say helped them rediscover Christianity, although Cartman thinks they share his genocidal sentiments after watching the film. He suggests that each attendee take one more person to see the film before they begin what he refers to as "the cleansing" — the fan club members obliviously agree.

When Stan and Kenny reach Gibson's house, the director rambles, straps himself to a rack and says that no matter how much they torture him, he will never refund their money. When the boys insist that they just want their money back, Gibson chases them around the house, imitating Daffy Duck gags while doing so. Stan and Kenny take eighteen dollars from Gibson's wallet and flee on a bus home. Gibson, wearing face paint from Braveheart, chases their bus in the tanker truck from Mad Max 2, screaming "Qapla'!" and "Gimme back my money!" Back in South Park, Kyle talks to Father Maxi about his issues regarding Jesus and the guilt he has been feeling since seeing Gibson's film. Father Maxi points out that the Bible does not consider the crucifixion itself to be important and that the Passion was originally a play intended to instill antisemitism, but says that its subject matter can still help people. Kyle seizes on Father Maxi's statement that "Christianity is about atonement" and says he now understands what he should do.

At another fan club rally outside the South Park theater, Cartman shouts hateful slogans in German and gives the ignorant South Park residents lines to shout back; mistaking the German for the Aramaic spoken in The Passion, they happily do so and join Cartman in goose-stepping through South Park shouting "Es ist Zeit für Rache", "Wir müssen die Juden ausrotten" ("It's time for revenge, we must exterminate the Jews"). Meanwhile, Kyle suggests at his synagogue that just as the United States apologized to the African American community for racial segregation and slavery and Germany apologized to everyone and the Jewish community for World War II and the Holocaust, the Jewish community should apologize to the Christian community for Jesus' crucifixion, prompting uproar in the congregation. When Kyle uses The Passion as his reasoning, the congregation declares that the film should be banned on account of promoting antisemitism. The rabbi tries to calm the situation and assures them that a mere film cannot incite intolerance in a rational community, but just then, Cartman and his group pass the synagogue.

Outraged, the rabbi and congregation go to the theater and demand that they stop showing The Passion until Cartman and his club shows up and defends the film. Their argument is interrupted by the arrival of the truck chase — Gibson crashes into the theater, destroying it. When he emerges unscathed, Cartman rushes to meet him and prostrates at his feet, but Gibson ignores him and, rambling, smears his own excrement on a building while still daring the townsfolk to torture him, much to the astonishment of Kyle and the fan club members. Gibson then makes a final attempt to get his money back from Stan and Kenny, who refuse, and dismisses Stan's criticism of his film as an attack on Christianity itself, to which Stan replies that using the crucifixion to inspire faith only leads to violence and hate, while focusing on Jesus' teachings inspires compassion. The fans agree and disperse, much to Cartman's dismay. Kyle says that he feels better about being Jewish after hearing Stan's speech and seeing Gibson's demeanor, who defecates on Cartman's horrified face and runs off whooping.

== Cultural references ==
The poster of Mel Gibson on Cartman's wall is from Gibson's 1995 film Braveheart. On Stan and Kenny's way out to get their money back for The Passion, Stan remarks, "This is about being able to hold bad filmmakers responsible. This is just like when we got our money back for BASEketball." BASEketball is a 1998 comedy film in which Parker and Stone starred but now regret. The way Gibson behaves while chasing Stan and Kenny through his mansion is reminiscent of Looney Tunes, specifically Daffy Duck in the short Yankee Doodle Daffy. Gibson saying, "Two days ago, I saw a vehicle that would haul that tanker. You want to get out of here? You talk to me" is a famous quote of his Mad Max character in the 1981 film Mad Max 2: The Road Warrior. His "Qapla!" stems from the Klingon word for "success/victory” in Star Trek and was also used in Parker and Stone's Team America: World Police.

== Reception ==
The New York Times' Virginia Heffernan praised the episode, writing "Depending on whom you asked, that episode, 'The Passion of the Jew,' proved that the show's still got it or that it's made a comeback or that it's better than ever. In any case, it was good." It was also praised by the Anti-Defamation League and the Jewish newspaper The Jewish Daily Forward, which called it "perhaps the most biting critique of 'The Passion' to date."

== Home media ==
Besides appearing on the South Park complete eighth season DVD set, "Passion of the Jew" is also available as a standalone DVD release (which was released on DVD the same day that the DVD of the Passion of the Christ was released) with two bonus episodes: season six's "Red Hot Catholic Love" and season seven's "Christian Rock Hard".

== See also ==
- Jewish deicide
