= List of South Park guest stars =

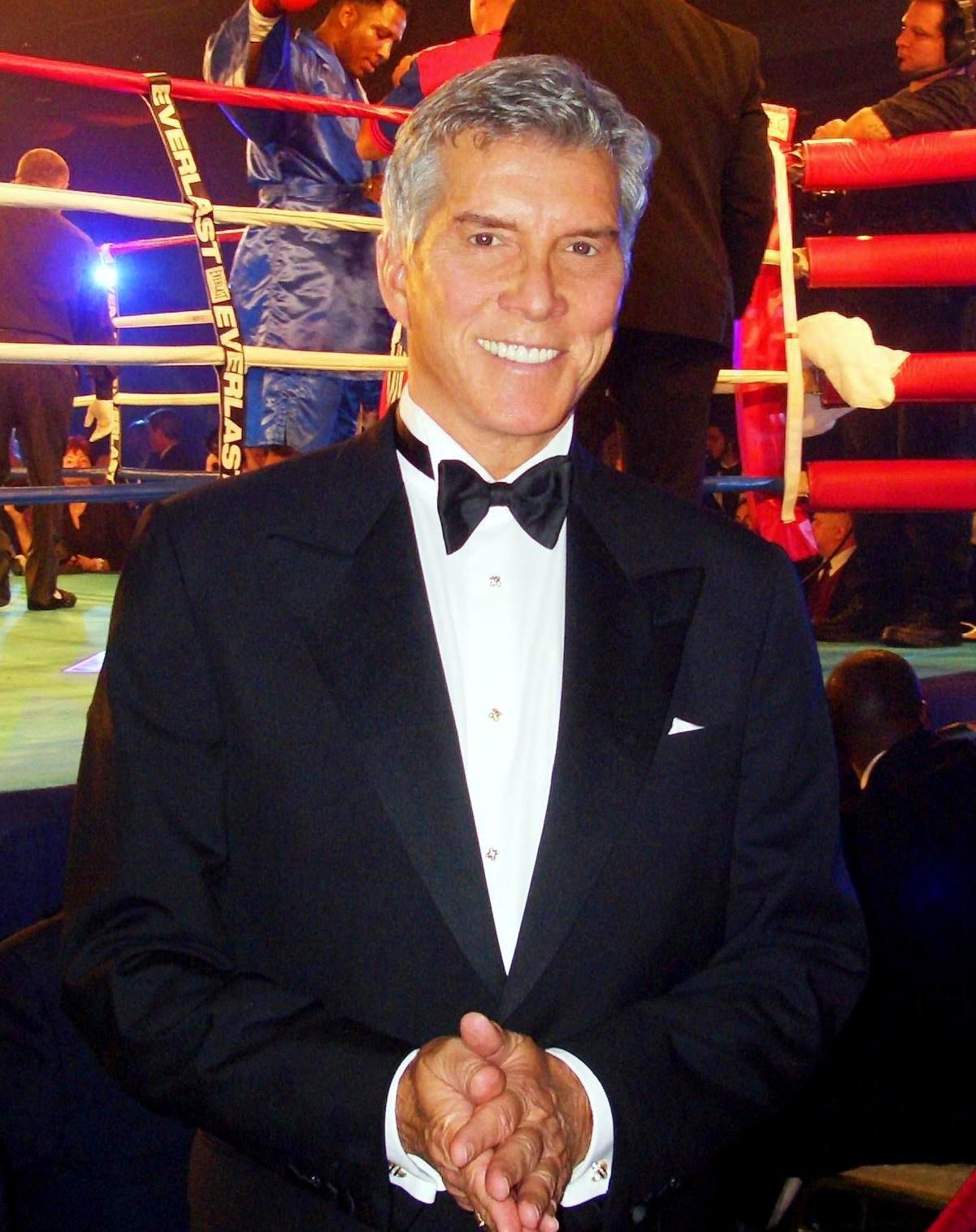
Professional ring announcer Michael Buffer made a guest appearance in "Damien", in which he spoke his trademark phrase, "Let's get ready to rumble!"

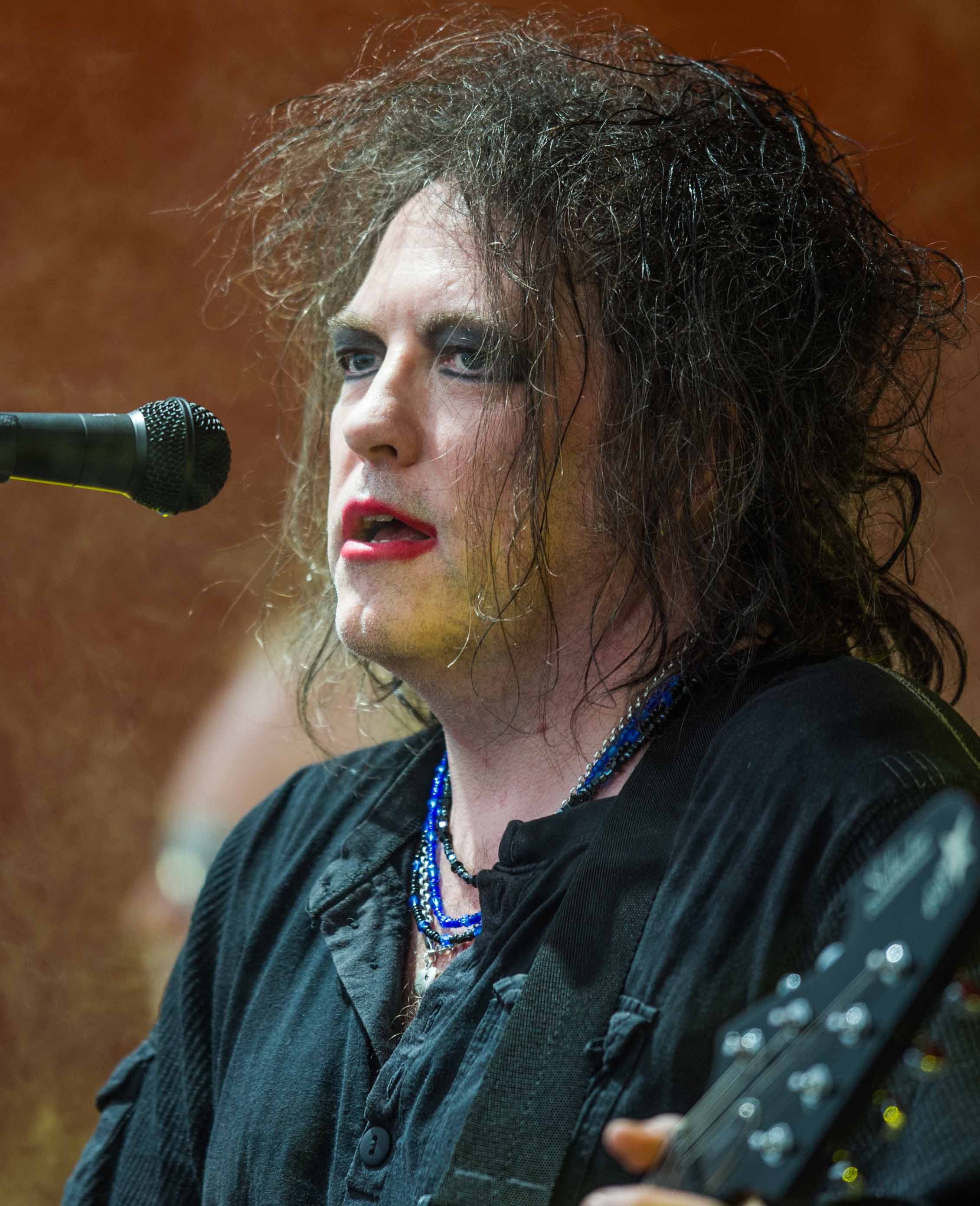
Robert Smith, who appeared in "Mecha-Streisand" as himself, was cast because South Park co-creator Trey Parker was a fan of his music.

South Park is an American animated television series created by Trey Parker and Matt Stone for the Comedy Central television network. Throughout the series, various celebrities have been impersonated (poorly) by the show's creators. However, numerous celebrities have guest-starred in the following episodes.

== Season 1 ==
- Episode 4: "Big Gay Al's Big Gay Boat Ride"
  - George Clooney as Sparky
- Episode 10: "Damien"
  - Michael Buffer as himself
- Episode 11: "Tom's Rhinoplasty"
  - Natasha Henstridge (credited as "The Chick from Species" in the opening credits) as Ms. Ellen
- Episode 12: "Mecha-Streisand"
  - Robert Smith as himself
- Episode 13: "Cartman's Mom Is a Dirty Slut"
  - Jay Leno as Mr. Kitty

== Season 2 ==
- Episode 7: "City on the Edge of Forever"
  - Henry Winkler as the Kid-Eating Monster
  - Jay Leno as himself
  - Brent Musburger as Scuzzlebutt's leg
- Episode 8: "Summer Sucks"
  - Jonathan Katz as Dr. Katz
- Episode 14: "Chef Aid"
  - Joe Strummer as himself
  - Rancid as themselves
  - Ozzy Osbourne as himself
  - Ween as themselves
  - Primus as themselves
  - Elton John as himself
  - Meat Loaf as himself
  - Rick James as himself
  - DMX as himself
  - Devo as themselves

== Season 3 ==
- Episode 1: "Rainforest Shmainforest"
  - Jennifer Aniston as Miss Stevens
- Episode 10: "Korn's Groovy Pirate Ghost Mystery"
  - Korn (Jonathan Davis, James Shaffer, Brian Welch, Reginald Arvizu, David Silveria) as themselves

== Season 4 ==
- Episode 1: "The Tooth Fairy's Tats 2000"
  - Richard Belzer as Loogie
- Episode 6: "Cherokee Hair Tampons"
  - Cheech Marin as Carlos Ramirez
  - Tommy Chong as Chief Running Pinto
- Episode 12: "Trapper Keeper"
  - Kief Davidson (credited as Keef Davidson) as Kindergarteners
- Episode 13: "Helen Keller! The Musical"
  - Kief Davidson (credited as Keef Davidson) as Kindergarteners
- Episode 14: "Pip"
  - Malcolm McDowell as narrator ("A British Person")
- Episode 17: "A Very Crappy Christmas"
  - Louis Price (credited as Lewis Price) as Cornwallis' singing voice

== Season 5 ==
- Episode 4: "Scott Tenorman Must Die"
  - Radiohead as themselves

== Season 7 ==
- Episode 4: "I'm a Little Bit Country"
  - Norman Lear as Benjamin Franklin

== Season 8 ==
- Episode 4: "You Got F'd in the A"
  - Yao Ming as Yao
- Episode 6: "The Jeffersons"
  - Trey Parker as Michael Jefferson

== Season 9 ==
- Episode 3: "Wing"
  - Wing as herself
- Episode 4: "The Losing Edge"
  - Diedrich Bader as Bat Dad
- Episode 10: "Follow That Egg!"
  - Jonathan Kimmel as Jakarta

== Season 10 ==
- Episode 1: "The Return of Chef"
  - Peter Serafinowicz as Darth Chef
- Episode 3: "Cartoon Wars Part 1"
  - Jonathan Kimmel as Peter Griffin
- Episode 4: "Cartoon Wars Part 2"
  - Jonathan Kimmel as Peter Griffin
- Episode 10: "Miss Teacher Bangs a Boy"
  - Kathryn Howell as Miss Stevenson

== Season 13 ==
- Episode 5: "Fishsticks"
  - Jonathan Kimmel as Jimmy Kimmel

== Season 14 ==
- Episode 9: "It's a Jersey Thing"
  - Robert Amstler as Arnold Schwarzenegger

== Season 15 ==
- Episode 7: "You're Getting Old"
  - Bill Hader as farmer #2
- Episode 13: "A History Channel Thanksgiving"
  - Patrick Lander as Duncan Everton / Donald T Brown

== Season 16 ==
- Episode 6: "I Should Have Never Gone Ziplining"
  - Michael Zazarino as Live action Stan
  - Brandon Hardesty as Live action Cartman
  - Eric Meyers as Narrator
- Episode 7: "Cartman Finds Love"
  - Brad Paisley as himself

== Season 17 ==
- Episode 1: "Let Go, Let Gov"
  - Bill Hader as Alec Baldwin
- Episode 5: "Taming Strange"
  - Bill Hader as Plex

== Season 18 ==
- Episode 3: "The Cissy"
  - Sia as Lorde
- Episode 7: "Grounded Vindaloop"
  - Bill Hader as Steve
- Episode 8: "Cock Magic"
  - Peter Serafinowicz as Match Commentator
- Episode 9: "#REHASH"
  - PewDiePie as himself
- Episode 10: "#HappyHolograms"
  - Bill Hader as Steve
  - PewDiePie as himself

== Season 19 ==
- Episode 7: "Naughty Ninjas"
  - Bill Hader as Tom
- Episode 8: "Sponsored Content"
  - Bill Hader as Tom
- Episode 9: "Truth and Advertising"
  - Bill Hader as Tom

== Season 20 ==
- Episode 8: "Members Only"
  - Elon Musk as himself
- Episode 9: "Not Funny"
  - Elon Musk as himself
- Episode 10: "The End of Serialization as We Know It"
  - Elon Musk as himself

== Season 21 ==
- Episode 5: "Hummels & Heroin"
  - Josh Gad as Marcus Preston

== Season 22 ==
- Episode 5: "The Scoots"
  - Lex Lang as The Narrator

== Season 23 ==
- Episode 2: "Band in China"
  - Brock Baker as Winnie The Pooh
- Episode 5: "Tegridy Farms Halloween Special"
  - Brock Baker as Winnie The Pooh
- Episode 9: "Basic Cable"
  - Becca Scott as Sophie Gray

== Season 24 ==
- Episode 1: "The Pandemic Special"
  - Josef "Sef" Saul Furman as a Texas Make-a-Wish recipient

== Season 25 ==
- Episode 4: "Back to the Cold War"
  - Endre Hules as Sergei Shoigu
