= Creek (fandom) =

Depictions of a relationship between South Park characters Tweek and Craig

Craig (left) and Tweek (right), as depicted in the episode "Put It Down".

In fandom, Creek is the romantic pairing of Tweek Tweak and Craig Tucker, fictional characters from the American animated series South Park. Two elementary-school aged boys, Tweek and Craig were originally depicted as enemies in the season 3 episode "Tweek vs. Craig". The pairing derives from shipping culture, where shippers drew fan-art of the two; the ship was made canon in the season 19 episode "Tweek x Craig" (2015). The show further developed the ship in the episodes "Put It Down" (2017) and "We Be Clubbin'" (2026).

The Creek ship has become one of the most popular in the South Park fandom, particularly through fan creations. It has been praised by critics, mainly for its positive representation of homosexuality. Tweek and Craig's differing personalities have been a point of discussion amongst critics. The video game South Park: The Fractured but Whole contains several references to Creek, with a side quest of the game consisting of collecting yaoi of the two. The 2015 and 2017 episodes revolving around the ship each garnered South Park a Primetime Emmy nomination.

== Fictional character biographies ==
Tweek Tweak and Craig Tucker are two background characters in South Park, whose first major interaction—and only one prior to "Tweek x Craig"—was in season 3's "Tweek vs. Craig". The episode is often cited as the catalyst for the ship. The pairing of Tweek and Craig, commonly referred to as "Creek", dates back to 2005, when fan-art depicting the two as a romantic couple began appearing on DeviantArt. "Countless" pieces of fan-art and fan-fiction depicting Tweek and Craig have been created by fans. Since its inception, Creek has remained one of the most celebrated ships in the South Park fandom, maintaining a level of popularity on FanFiction.net rivaled only by Style, the romantic pairing of Stan and Kyle.

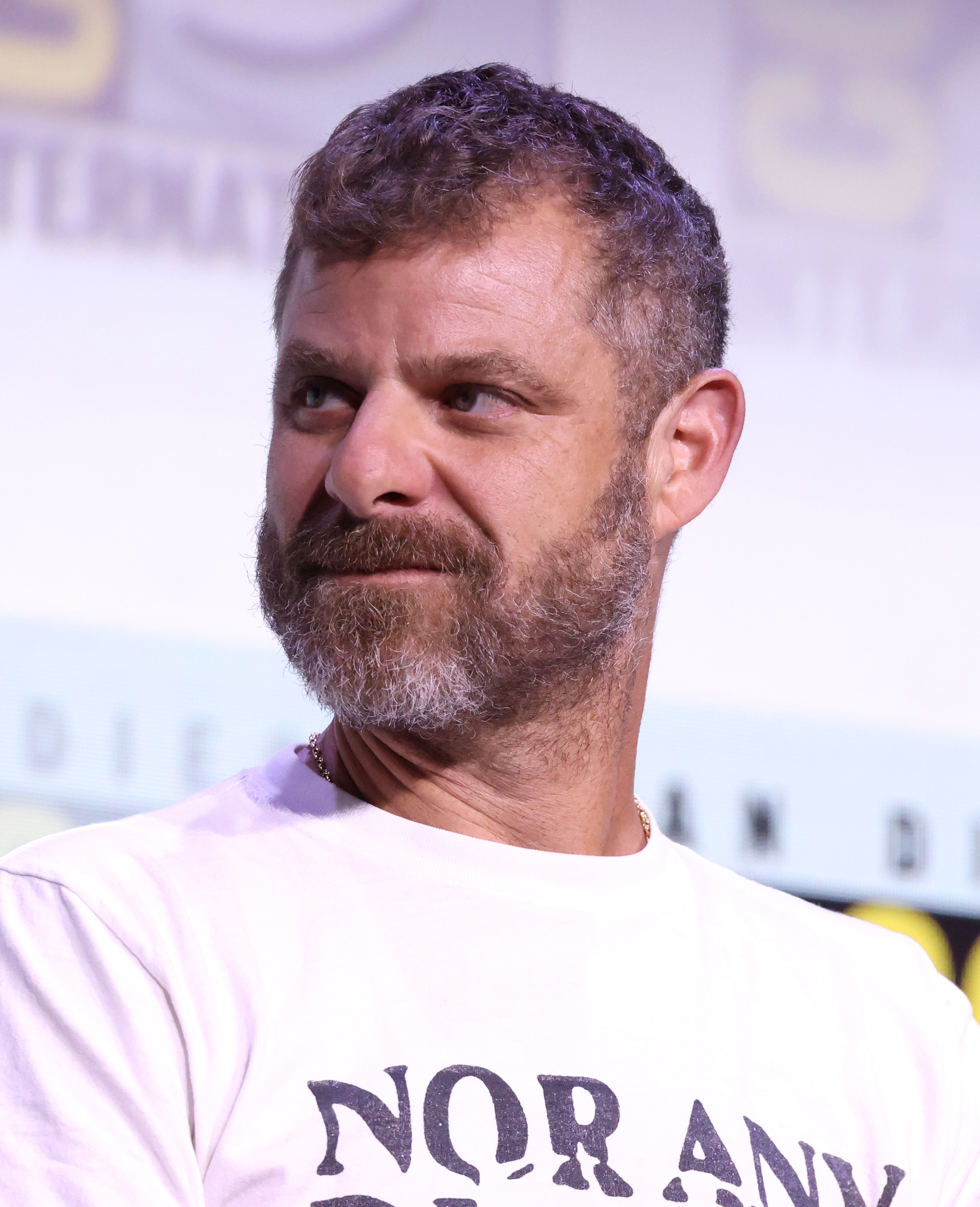
Matt Stone (pictured) portrays both Tweek Tweak and Craig Tucker in South Park.

A reference to Craig's possible homosexuality appears in the season 19 episode "The City Part of Town", in which Mayor McDaniels introduces him as such; the episode aired prior to "Tweek x Craig", where the boys become romantically involved. Once the show's writers became aware of Creek's popularity, they posted to the series' official blog asking fans to submit yaoi (Note: Yaoi is a genre of Japanese fan-art, often created by women, which depicts two male characters in homosexual relationships.) artwork of Tweek and Craig to be featured in "Tweek x Craig"; roughly 1,500 pieces of art were submitted.

In the episode, Tweek and Craig are initially hesitant to begin a relationship, overwhelmed by the enthusiastic support they receive from the town of South Park. Ultimately, they decide to become boyfriends in order to appease South Park's residents. The episode's ending did not make it clear if the two were sincere in their relationship or if they were only putting on a facade for the town. Subsequent episodes confirm that Tweek and Craig remain in a relationship following "Tweek x Craig". Creek was the first piece of fan-fiction to ever be featured on South Park.

The game South Park: The Fractured but Whole includes both Tweek and Craig in superhero alter-egos; a side quest of the game involves collecting yaoi portraits of the two, similar to those shown in "Tweek x Craig". The player must also help them take couples therapy with the school counselor, Mr. Mackey; and one of the boys' special moves, entitled Eros Eruption, references Eros, the Greek god of love and sex.

== Reception and analysis ==
Collider listed Creek as the second best relationship in the series, labeling them as a "normal and happy" couple, and noting how they, unlike many other of the series' couples, remained together in "South Park: Post COVID" and "South Park: Post COVID: The Return of COVID", two television specials depicting the show's main cast as adults. Kayla Cobb of Decider described Creek, particularly their appearance in "Tweek x Craig", as a satirization of how political correctness can potentially cause someone to be lumped in with groups that they do not agree with. Heidi MacDonald of The Beat called the show's use of yaoi as "close to mainstream" as the genre has gotten. Creek has been credited as one of the reasons for Yaoi's popularity in the United States.

Writing for Den of Geek, David Crow noted that Creek showcases how South Park has matured with its LGBTQ representation, saying that series creators Matt Stone and Trey Parker have shown a "sophisticated" understanding of the subject following their first—and possibly offensive—take on homosexuality in the episode "Big Gay Al's Big Gay Boat Ride". For portraying the two in "Tweek x Craig", Stone received a nomination for Outstanding Character Voice-Over Performance at the 68th Primetime Creative Arts Emmys.

The episode "Tweek x Craig" has been analyzed as a satirical look at Creek, with Zach Wilson of CBR suggesting that the episode "ironically [reacts]" to the ship and is used to introspectively show the audience that they have contributed to the series with their fan-creations. Tweek and Craig's differing dispositions have been analyzed by critics, with one such critic analyzing their clashing personalities in the episode "Put It Down" as representative of the differing public opinion on possible nuclear warfare with North Korea. The episode "Put It Down" earned the series a nomination for Outstanding Animated Program at the 70th Primetime Creative Arts Emmys.

/Film writer BJ Colangelo praised Creek for not pandering to usual gay stereotypes and instead keeping the characters exactly as they were prior to the relationship, despite their opposite personalities. The episode "We Be Clubbin'" was praised by The Guardian for inverting the dynamic between the two characters, with Craig being racked with anxiety and Tweek calming him down.

== See also ==
- Boys' Love
- Shipping
