= Tweek and Craig =

Tweek and Craig refer to the characters Tweek Tweak and Craig Tucker in South Park, who have been featured in the following eponymous episodes:

- Tweek vs. Craig, Season 3, Episode 5
- Tweek x Craig, Season 19, Episode 6

It may also refer to the ship, whose name is a combination of the two's first names:

- Creek (fandom), a ship between Tweak and Craig
