= HappyHolograms =

"#HappyHolograms"
- South Park episode
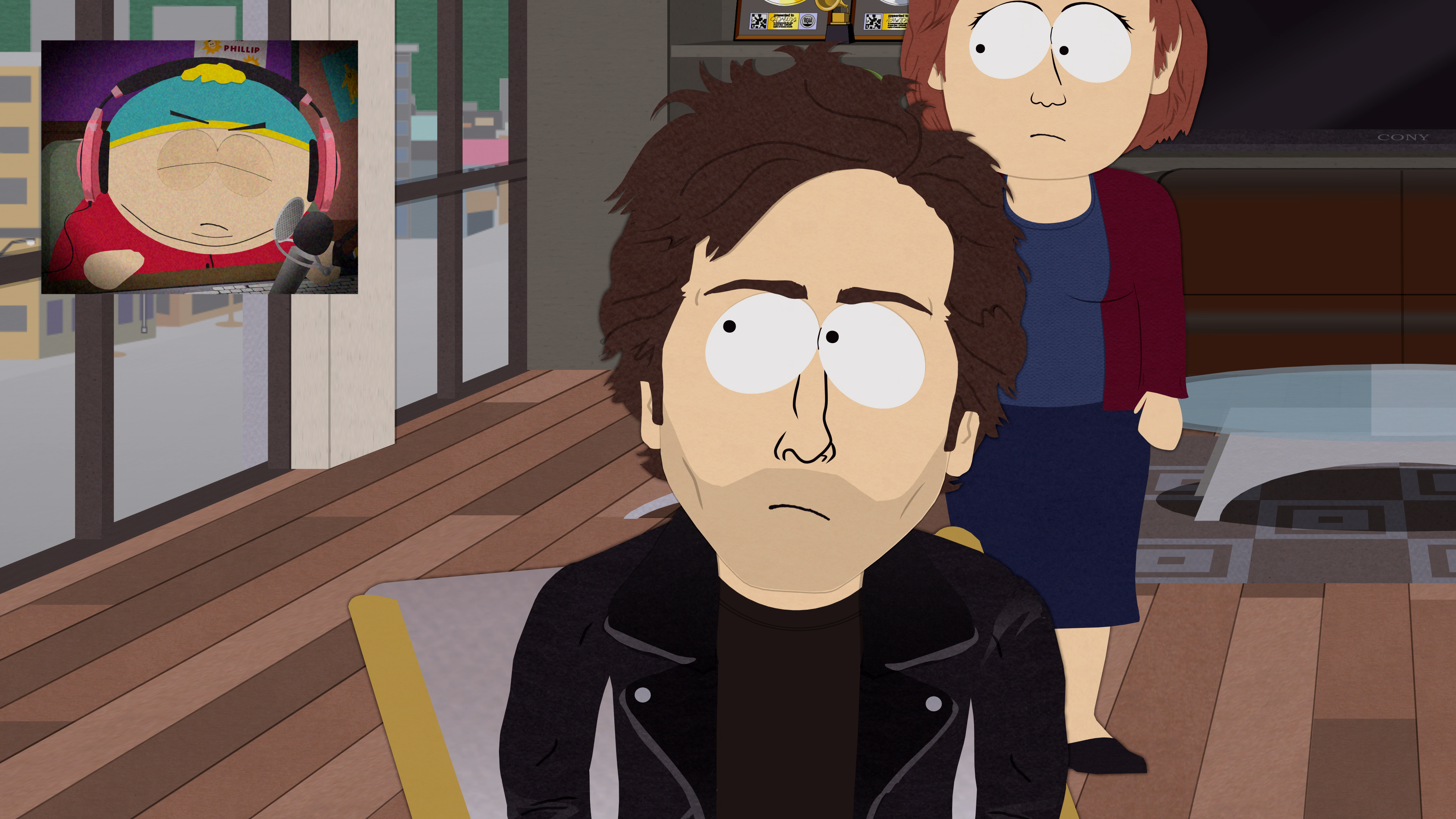
- CEO Ron Perry was parodied in the episode.
- Episode no.: Season 18; Episode 10
- Directed by: Trey Parker
- Written by: Trey Parker
- Production code: 1810
- Original air date: December 10, 2014

Guest appearances
- PewDiePie as himself (live action); Bill Hader as Steve

Episode chronology
← Previous "#REHASH"	Next → "Stunning and Brave"
- South Park season 18

"#HappyHolograms" is the tenth and final episode in the eighteenth season of the American animated television series South Park. The 257th episode overall, it was written and directed by series co-creator and co-star Trey Parker. The episode premiered on Comedy Central in the United States on December 10, 2014. It is the second part of the two-part season finale which began with the previous episode, "#REHASH". The episode makes multiple references to earlier episodes over the season, as well as to previous seasons, while mainly lampooning the trend of culture constantly making trending topics on Twitter with no actual relevance. It also lampoons news events such as the death of Eric Garner, the shooting of Michael Brown, the sexual assault allegations against Bill Cosby, the use of celebrity holograms, and generationism. YouTuber PewDiePie appears as himself, continuing his story line from the previous episode.

== Plot ==
Kyle Broflovski, feeling that the popularity of Let's Play is leading to a countrywide "crisis", sends out a message on Twitter to help families come together. In response, Bill Cosby visits Kyle and invites him to star in a Christmas television special. Kyle agrees, unaware that Cosby is a hologram. The holiday special, entitled "The Washington Redskins Go Fuck Yourself Holiday Special", a production of the conspiracy between Randy's former producer and Eric Cartman, is planned to feature various celebrities, holograms, and Cartman's commentary, along with performances of various holidays songs. The producer's staff, however, feels unaware that he has given too much power to Cartman, whose growing popularity results in his commentary window pervading throughout the world. Upon seeing an advertisement for the special, Kyle is furious that his idea has become a social media project, while Stan Marsh is upset at his father Randy's supposed involvement.

Randy and Sharon Marsh file a police report on the hologram of Randy's secret identity Lorde, but the police are skeptical. A patrolman catches the rogue Mr. Jefferson hologram, but cannot physically apprehend him. Randy and Mr. Jefferson learn of the special and agree to work together. When the Tupac Shakur hologram sent to capture Mr. Jefferson appears at the police station, Randy and Mr. Jefferson escape to the Marsh home. Randy learns that Stan and Kyle were taken hostage by the producer and is confronted by Tupac.

When Kyle questions the producer about the holiday special, he explains that when he became a grandfather, one day he asked his grandson who his favorite celebrity was, the grandson's response being PewDiePie. Disillusioned and dissatisfied that his grandson admired an internet personality, the producer reveals his true intention—to assimilate the younger generation's culture into his own. Stan calls out the producer for being "such a grandpa", much to the latter's frustration. When Cartman's window appears before the producer, he attempts to have him shut down, but Cartman's power has grown to the point where he has reached "trend-scendence".

Having become self-aware as Cartman infrequently hijacks to continue appearing on screens all around the world, he states that he is now "trends-gender" and, therefore, must be given his bathroom, his motivation for being involved. The holograms of Tupac and Mr. Jefferson team up against the producer and storm the restaurant where he has the hostages. As Mr. Jefferson kills the producer, Kyle, realizing that the world's population can see one another, speaks out to his brother, Ike, apologizing for being a "grandpa". He accepts that Ike will develop his generational interests, and admits his jealousy at Ike being a fan of Cartman. Ike and his friends create a new Twitter trend, #webelieveinyou, which Kyle urges the audience to spread. In response, PewDiePie arrives and overpowers Cartman.

In the aftermath, Kyle's family has agreed to spend one hour together each night, though Stan is still confused over the previous events. Kyle suggests that they may never understand it, and further says that at least YouTube celebrities are authentic, having never been marketed to the public by corporations and entertainment industries. PewDiePie appears, grateful for the people of South Park.

== Production ==
The episode contains numerous references to previous episodes in the series, mostly in connection to Randy Marsh's double life as Lorde. Customer service employee "Steve" returns from "Grounded Vindaloop", as does the Washington Redskins logo from "Go Fund Yourself", while Cartman's desire for his own bathroom is from "The Cissy".

On the DVD audio commentary, Trey Parker and Matt Stone, in hindsight, thought the story would have been better off split up into three episodes and not two, mainly because there was a lot of content left that they wanted to use but not enough time. The original plan was to make the story three episodes long but they settled for two.

The episode makes numerous references to the deaths of Eric Garner and Michael Brown, as well as the sexual assault allegations against Bill Cosby.

== Reception ==
The episode received a B rating from The A.V. Club's Dan Caffrey, though he stated that "It was rushed, it was messy, and it may have been just a bit too much story for South Park, even for a two-parter."

Max Nicholson of IGN gave it a 6.8 out of 10, and stated "the climax of the entire episode (and arguably the season)...didn't tie everything together in the way that it could (and should) have."

Chris Longo from Den of Geek gave the episode 4 out of 5 stars, stating the episode "was incoherent, hilarious madness—its own artform." Longo's article also noted that, in real life, the topic #IHateCartmanBrah became the top trending topic worldwide on Twitter.
