= South Park season 18 =

Season of television series

South Park
- Season 18
- Home media release cover
- No. of episodes: 10

Release
- Original network: Comedy Central
- Original release: September 24 – December 10, 2014

Season chronology
- ← Previous; Season 17 Next → Season 19

The eighteenth season of the American animated sitcom South Park premiered on Comedy Central on September 24, 2014 with "Go Fund Yourself", and ended with "#HappyHolograms" on December 10, 2014, with a total of ten episodes. The season featured serial elements and recurring story lines, which The A.V. Club noted as an experimentation with episode-to-episode continuity, in which the episodes "explore the consequences of the boys' actions [week to week], allowing the plots to be motivated in part by their attempts to dig themselves out of a hole". As with most seasons of the show, all episodes of season 18 were written and directed by the series co-creator and co-star Trey Parker.

== Episodes ==
No. overall	No. in season	Title	Directed by	Written by	Original release date	Prod. code	U.S. viewers (millions)
248	1	"Go Fund Yourself"	Trey Parker	Trey Parker	September 17, 2014	1801	2.40
Stan, Kyle, Cartman, Kenny, and Butters name their new startup company "The Washington Redskins". The owner of the Washington Redskins employs desperate measures to prevent them from using the name of his football team.
249	2	"Gluten Free Ebola"	Trey Parker	Trey Parker	September 24, 2014	1802	2.24
The entire town of South Park is scared into going gluten-free. Following the events of the previous episode, everyone at school is angry at the boys for ditching them. Determined to win them back, they attempt to throw the "most epic party ever".
250	3	"The Cissy"	Trey Parker	Trey Parker	October 1, 2014	1803	2.02
Cartman declares himself "transginger" and tries to commandeer the girls' bathroom. Meanwhile, a reporter digs for answers about the musician Lorde who is actually Randy Marsh in disguise.
251	4	"Handicar"	Trey Parker	Trey Parker	October 15, 2014	1804	1.73
Timmy launches a new ride-sharing business called Handicar and makes a lot of enemies in the process. As cab drivers and electric cars all fight Timmy for the market, it seems the future of transportation will have to be decided by Wacky Races.
252	5	"The Magic Bush"	Trey Parker	Trey Parker	October 22, 2014	1805	1.73
Cartman and Butters get their hand on a drone and catch Craig's mom completely naked. The resulting video soon goes viral. The parents band together to form a drone-powered neighborhood watch. Butters' dad struggles with the spooky notion that his drone is haunted.
253	6	"Freemium Isn't Free"	Trey Parker	Trey Parker	October 29, 2014	1806	1.70
Stan is addicted to the new Terrance and Phillip mobile game. Concerned about their game's dishonest "freemium" business model, Terrance and Phillip confront the Canadian Department of Mobile Gaming.
254	7	"Grounded Vindaloop"	Trey Parker	Trey Parker	November 12, 2014	1807	1.66
Cartman convinces Butters he is living in a virtual world, but Butters wreaks havoc at home and all over South Park.
255	8	"Cock Magic"	Trey Parker	Trey Parker	November 19, 2014	1808	1.69
Kenny's skills at Magic: The Gathering win him the boys' admiration until they discover a battle going on in the basement of City Wok. As South Park's police try to put a stop to this illegal sport, Randy reveals his own brand of "cock magic".
256	9	"#REHASH"	Trey Parker	Trey Parker	December 3, 2014	1809	2.10
Kyle thinks he and Ike should be bonding but Ike and his friends would rather watch someone else's online commentary. While Kyle fears he has become a grandpa, Cartman capitalizes by creating a new online persona.
257	10	"#HappyHolograms"	Trey Parker	Trey Parker	December 10, 2014	1810	1.66
Kyle rallies people to follow his campaign and creates the most extravagant televised holiday spectacular ever. But with multiple holograms on the loose and Cartman trending, it takes more for Kyle to reconnect with his little brother.

== See also ==
- South Park (Park County, Colorado)
- South Park City
