= PC Principal Final Justice =

- South Park episode
- Episode no.: Season 19; Episode 10
- Directed by: Trey Parker
- Written by: Trey Parker
- Production code: 1910
- Original air date: December 9, 2015

Episode chronology
← Previous "Truth and Advertising"	Next → "Member Berries"
- South Park season 19

"PC Principal Final Justice" (also known as "PC Principal") is the tenth and final episode of the nineteenth season and the 267th overall episode of the animated television series South Park, written and directed by series co-creator Trey Parker. The episode premiered on Comedy Central on December 9, 2015. It is the third and final part of a three-episode story arc that began with the episode "Sponsored Content" and continued in the episode "Truth and Advertising", which collectively serve as the season finale. The episode parodies the abundance of online advertising, as well as gun politics in the United States, as part of its season-long lampoon of political correctness.

== Plot ==
PC Principal walks into a bar in a gentrified location in Russia. He is assaulted by patrons there but is able to kill every one of his attackers. At South Park Elementary, Kyle calls a meeting in the bathroom with Cartman, Stan, Kenny, and Butters to tell them that he believes Jimmy is dead at the hands of Principal, as per information he has been given by Leslie. He also states his belief that Stan's father, Randy has been helping Principal to kill any objectors to his political correctness views, and Stan leaves in disgust. Kyle convinces Cartman, Kenny, and Butters to all get guns to protect themselves, and they quickly do so.

At dinner with his family, Randy excuses himself to the garage where Mr. Garrison, Principal Victoria and Caitlyn Jenner are examining Principal's hard drive which they seized. They discover that Principal has been fighting gentrification worldwide because he believes the source behind it is not human. They also conclude that whoever started the joke that resulted in Victoria being fired must be the mastermind behind the whole scheme. In South Park's gentrified Shi Tpa Town, Nathan and his prostitute girlfriend Classi hold Jimmy hostage at gunpoint and remove his crutches. Nathan reveals he has been using the political correctness people to work with the ads and thus gain the power he desires. At home, Cartman and his mother Liane have an argument which leads to Cartman pointing his gun at Liane, but Liane responds by pointing a gun at Cartman and she successfully gets Cartman to listen to her. Stan discovers Randy and the others in the garage and points his gun at Randy to force him to come clean, but Randy responds by pointing a gun at Stan. This leads to an argument where Sharon, Randy, Stan, and Shelly all point guns at each other but eventually have a discussion where everyone listens to one another, and Randy agrees to disclose everything he knows.

Principal is captured and brought on board an aircraft carrier where a phone call is received from Barack Obama demanding that Principal be released and completely ignored, but it is revealed that Leslie is impersonating Obama. At a gun store, business is brisk, and Jimbo reveals to Officer Barbrady that there is an upcoming gun show that the entire town will attend, and Barbrady is concerned. Leslie convinces Kyle to go to the gun show and make one of his speeches about what he learned. Kyle initially declines as he has given up giving speeches, though agrees as long as Leslie is with him. At the Marsh home, the group discovers the online ad featuring Principal and Leslie, and Stan concludes that Kyle is the mastermind since he is now helping Leslie, and they drive off with their guns. Nathan shows a preview of the next day's school newspaper to Jimmy with a headline of a tragedy occurring at the gun show, but when Classi raises an objection, Nathan slaps her, as he had previously done with Mimsy, his former sidekick. Classi, however, does not tolerate this and physically assaults Nathan before giving Jimmy his crutches back, and they drive off together to find Barbrady and get to the gun show.

The gun show, which resembles more of a dog breed show, is interrupted by Randy and his group with their guns drawn, and they call out for Kyle. Kyle and Leslie arrive with their gun, followed shortly by Jimmy, Barbrady, and Classi also with guns. Jimmy reveals that Leslie is an ad that has become sentient and that no one can tell who is an ad and who is human. In the audience, Mr. Mackey draws out his gun and reveals that he was the one who got Victoria fired. Everyone with guns has a conversation with one another where they realize that they all need to be more attentive to one another. Leslie vows that ads will never be defeated, but as she does, Principal arrives and physically assaults her, finally "expelling" and killing her with a punch through her face. Back in Shi Tpa Town, Randy, along with all of South Park, yells at the Whole Foods Market that they now are aware of the problems caused by ads, and the market uproots itself from the ground and flies away. Principal announces to the school that he will remain there and continue to fight for PC while also fighting to eliminate ads by keeping South Park as politically correct as possible.

== Critical reception ==
IGN's Max Nicholson gave the episode a 7.4 out of 10, stating that the episode "was a mixed bag in terms of tying everything together. While it did offer a satisfying mix of PC, ads and gentrification, the resolution felt like a first draft in need of some serious editing." Chris Longo from Den of Geek gave the episode 4 out of 5 stars, stating, "By using headline grabbers like Trump, Jenner, ISIS and gun control sparingly throughout the season, [Matt Stone and Trey Parker] created the sharpest and most nuanced arc in the show's history" Writing for The A.V. Club, Dan Caffrey rated the episode an A−, stating, "The show's creators have now moved past simply making fun of social-justice warriors in favor of examining how the SJW mentality can leave one vulnerable to corporate manipulation. That's a far more complex message than 'PC culture = stupid and bad.'"
