= We Be Clubbin' (South Park) =

5th episode of the 29th season of South Park

- South Park episode
- Episode no.: Season 29; Episode 5
- Directed by: Trey Parker
- Written by: Trey Parker
- Production code: 2905
- Original air date: November 11, 2026

Episode chronology
| ← Previous "Guinea Pig on a Stick" | Next → — |
- South Park season 29

"We Be Clubbin'" is the fifth episode of the twenty-ninth season of the American animated television series South Park, and the 343rd episode of the series overall. It premiered on Comedy Central on November 11, 2026.

== Plot ==
During a school assembly at South America Elementary, PC Principal announces that as a result of the Democrats' victories in the 2026 midterm elections, the school will be implementing new "liberal" changes, and will no longer ignore minority students, including gay ones. Fourth grader Eric Cartman realizes that he and his classmates forgot that the previous week was the anniversary of Craig Tucker and Tweek Tweak's relationship, though Jimmy Valmer informs his friends that Craig himself has forgotten it too. Tweek wants to spend time with Craig but ever since Craig joined South America Club Sports (SACS), he has been too busy for him. Tweek then asks his parents to join Club Sports himself, but his parents learn from the SACS manager that this consists of nothing more than driving their children to an endless series of meetups at various clubs and paying endless fees, even for things like parking and wristbands to be granted entry to the facilities. The boys are separated to two tiers, designated A and B, the former of which are instructed to not associate with the latter, being told the boys on the B tier are terrible. Meanwhile, the parents are directed to the facility bars, only to be then directed to take their boys to the next meetup, even though the boys have not played anything. The parents are pressured to continue this cycle by the manager, who warns them that their boys may not get into college without it.

When Tweek observes to Craig that club sports appears to consist of nothing more than getting up early to drive from town to town, checking into hotels and incurring constant fees, Craig agrees, saying that "it sucks", and questions why Tweek decided to join. Tweek says that he did so in the hopes of spending more time with him. While the parents have become sucked into this cycle, Tweek becomes angry when Craig informs him that he is attending an upcoming seminar, saying that these activities are making it impossible to spend time together. When the manager witnesses their argument and realizes that the two boys are gay, he says that this changes everything. The manager goes to Tweek's parents (who are unable to continue funding Tweek's club sports membership) and informs them that he wants to put Craig and Tweek on the Triple A tier, which will not cost any money, as their membership will henceforth be funded by the parents of the other boys, who will also subsidize the Tweaks' coffee shop.

The manager casts Craig and Tweek in a Heated Rivalry-themed video ad for SACS, which informs viewers that children enrolled in SACS will learn skills including checking into hotel rooms at group rates, managing frequent flyer miles, and downloading parking apps. When a fed-up Tweek quits, the manager tells Craig to convince Tweek to come back, threatening to put him on B Tier. When Craig goes to Tweek, he snaps, admitting that he himself only joined because of the fear tactics with which SACS warned Craig that he would not have a future without club sports. Tweek then consoles him, telling him that it is important to enjoy the little things in life. Craig admits after realizing that he forgot their anniversary, telling Tweek that he has made him happier than he would be without him.

Tweek observes they and their families have been swindled by a fat con man, who played on Craig's anxieties which bled into Tweek's. The two boys leave the club together, preferring to spend time in activities that do not require expensive memberships. The pair optimistically sit and drink red-and-blue slushies together as the camera zooms out to a map of the United States.

== Production ==
The episode focuses on Craig Tucker and Tweek Tweak, characters who are known by the nickname Creek since they began a romantic relationship in the 2015 episode "Tweek x Craig". The episode marks Tweek's first speaking role since the 2021 episode "South ParQ Vaccination Special".
