= The Magic Bush =

- South Park episode
- Episode no.: Season 18; Episode 5
- Directed by: Trey Parker
- Written by: Trey Parker
- Production code: 1805
- Original air date: October 29, 2014

Episode chronology
| ← Previous "Handicar" | Next → "Freemium Isn't Free" |
- South Park season 18

"The Magic Bush" is the fifth episode in the eighteenth season of the American animated television series South Park. The 252nd overall episode, it was written and directed by series co-creator and co-star Trey Parker. The episode premiered on Comedy Central in the United States on October 29, 2014. The episode lampoons the use of drone airplanes, leaked nude celebrity photos, and the shooting of Michael Brown and the following Ferguson unrest.

== Plot ==
Cartman goes to Butters' home and finds out that Butters' dad, Stephen, owns a drone. Cartman brings Butters and Kenny to his home to fly the drone around South Park in order to spy on the whole town. While doing so, they spy on Craig's mother, Laura, undressing. They tape her naked and laugh at her untrimmed pubic hair. Craig's father, Thomas, sees the drone and accuses Stephen of flying it as he is the only person in South Park with a drone, but Butters manages to fly the drone back before it can be discovered missing. Thomas makes Stephen wonder if the drone is capable of flying itself, as Butters is not allowed to fly it without his father's supervision. The next day, Cartman uploads the video footage to the Internet as multiple people repeatedly claim to not have watched the video. Butters feels guilty and tells Cartman in the bathroom that they should confess. Cartman convinces him not to do so while Kyle overhears their entire conversation.

A group meets to discuss the safety of everyone with drones becoming more prevalent, as Laura defends her choice to not shave her pubic hair. They decide the safest way to protect themselves from drones is to form a neighborhood watch program with drones of their own. Kyle confronts Cartman and Kenny about their use of the drone to spy, but Cartman accuses Kyle of spying in the bathroom. Stephen attempts to return his drone to the hobby store, telling the clerk that he believes the drone was flying itself, being unable to accept the possibility that his son used the drone without supervision.

Thomas and Laura go to the police to demand that all drones be made illegal. Cartman tells Butters that no one's private parts are safe from the Internet anymore, especially due to the recent release of nude celebrity photos. As Randy Marsh flies his drone around as part of the neighborhood watch, he spies on a couple having sexual intercourse. However, he is spotted by a police drone. The police drone shoots down Randy's drone, and the news reports that a police drone shot an unarmed civilian drone, and that the drone was black. Drone owners stage a candlelight vigil protest, but are ordered to stop by police drones. As riots break out and National Guard drones patrol the area, Stephen confronts Randy and tries to convince him that the drones are flying themselves.

As a 20/20 newsman interviews Thomas and Laura, Stephen intercepts the signal and questions how his drone was involved in the story, and how over 300 million people have now watched the nude video of Laura when everyone was told not to watch it and everyone (including the newsman himself) has claimed not to have watched it. Butters tells Cartman that they should turn themselves in, but Cartman has a plan. As the drones from the neighborhood watch, police, and National Guard appear about to riot, Cartman flies a drone past them carrying a blow-up sex doll with a huge unshaved pubic region, representing Laura. The drones are drawn to follow the sex doll, and Cartman's drone leads all the other drones out of town. Laura is celebrated for being the one to rid the town of drones, while the references of her pubic hair continues to the great dismay of Laura. Butters still feels guilty for Craig's mom, but quickly relents after Cartman makes a suggestion to make Laura proud.

== Production ==
On the DVD audio commentary for "The Magic Bush", Trey Parker and Matt Stone reveal the origin of the episode. After talking about drones, Parker decided to get one. He flew it around in his backyard, thought it was "pretty sweet", and put it away, with the intent to never touch it again. After showing Stone the footage he recorded, the two discussed how it is cool that "you can see everything" in the neighborhood, but "what else are you [really] gonna do with it". The idea that all one can do with a drone is spy on their neighbors was a theme in the episode.

Another occurrence that influenced the episode happened while Stone and Bill Hader were having breakfast outside a café. During the meal, the two heard a sudden buzzing noise that turned out to be a drone flying down the street. Parker said of this: "We didn't know who was flying it and it was one of those moments where you're like 'oh shit this is really different'." Parker continued: "That thing's just flying around and there's some guy looking at us. It really felt like the future, and not in a good way future."

Other things that finalized the decision to make an episode about drones were the fact that Parker and Stone were in disbelief that there are "no laws" concerning the recreational use of drones, and the sudden popularity of the devices, which Parker thought was interesting because he thinks drones are "fucking boring".

The minstrel's song at the end of the episode was originally 20–30 minutes long, but was cut down to less than a minute.

== Reception ==
The episode received mostly positive reviews from critics. The episode received a C+ rating from The A.V. Club's Eric Thurn. IGN's contributor Max Nicholson gave the episode an 8.2 out of 10. Daniel Kurland from Den of Geek gave the episode 4 out of 5 stars.
