= Stunning and Brave =

- South Park episode
- Episode no.: Season 19; Episode 1
- Directed by: Trey Parker
- Written by: Trey Parker
- Production code: 1901
- Original air date: September 16, 2015

Guest appearance
- Bill Hader as Farmer #2

Episode chronology
← Previous "#HappyHolograms"	Next → "Where My Country Gone?"
- South Park season 19

"Stunning and Brave" is the first episode in the nineteenth season of the American animated television series South Park. The 258th episode overall, it was written and directed by series co-creator Trey Parker. The episode aired on Comedy Central on September 16, 2015, and primarily parodies social justice warriors and political correctness within society, with a focus on the acceptance and praise of Caitlyn Jenner. The episode also lampoons Tom Brady and the Deflategate scandal.

== Plot ==
Mr. Mackey announces to the parents and students of South Park Elementary that following an incident in which a student referred to rape as a "Hot Cosby", Principal Victoria has been fired, and a new school administrator, PC Principal, has been hired in her place to make the school more progressive. PC Principal tells the assembly that he will work to make people aware of their racism and biases. When Kyle Broflovski is given two weeks' detention for saying that Caitlyn Jenner is not a hero, his father, Gerald, confronts Principal, and when he refers to Jenner as Bruce Jenner, Principal becomes violent and throws them both out of his office. When Gerald, Randy Marsh, Stuart McCormick and others speak critically of Jenner at a college bar, they are confronted by a group of violent, politically correct college men who insist that Jenner is stunning and brave. The college men and Principal decide to form a fraternity house. At school, Kyle, Stan Marsh, Kenny McCormick and Butters Stotch convince Eric Cartman to form a scheme to resolve the problem of Principal, invoking to him the image of Cartman's rule-breaking hero, New England Patriots quarterback Tom Brady. Cartman confronts Principal in the restroom, and threatens to frame him for child molestation, but Principal violently beats him for employing words that Principal perceives to be politically incorrect, and Cartman is hospitalized as a result.

Randy goes to the fraternity house and is inadvertently pledged into the group with the help of a large amount of alcohol. In the hospital, Cartman is ready to give up and accept that he and the rest of the gang are bigots, but Kyle refuses to accept this and is resolute in his position that Jenner is not a nice person. Randy and the other pledges shame Kyle by waking him to a room full of pigs painted with the word "biggit". After a dream where Cartman is simultaneously Tom Brady, Roger Goodell and Bill Belichick, with Brady evading consequences for his actions during the Deflategate scandal, Cartman pledges to Butters that he will get the better of Principal. After a brutal hazing, Kyle asks Stan to make Randy and his PC gang stop assaulting him. When Butters tells Cartman that Kyle is now the main target of the PC fraternity members, Cartman vows retribution. Cartman and others mount an 'anti-PC' assault on the fraternity house but Kyle interrupts it, publicly calling Jenner a hero and brave. PC Principal leads everyone to applaud Kyle, and a clip from the 2015 ESPY Awards is shown. Randy is then initiated into the PC fraternity, which believes he was responsible for Cartman's assault that prompted Kyle to "check his privilege". The boys begrudgingly conclude that political correctness is not going away any time soon.

== Reception ==
IGN's Max Nicholson gave the episode a 7.8 out of 10 and stated "South Park's latest episode took on political correctness with scathing wit and truly outrageous moments."

Chris Longo from Den of Geek rated it 3.5 out of 5 stars and said in his review that "it's easy to come away wanting more from this episode, although I thought the message was sound."

Writing for The A.V. Club, Dan Caffrey gave a B− rating to the episode and stated: "While the idea of equating the increasing mob mentality of the PC police with a hell-raising frat is funny at first, the comparison ultimately ends up being blunt, repetitive, and one-sided."

Jonathon Dornbush of Entertainment Weekly wrote that the show "points the finger at the faults of everyone else on both sides of the PC argument. And, if 'Stunning and Brave' is any indication, the show will continue to do so while remaining hilarious".

Writing for CBS Boston, Matt Dolloff praised Cartman's dream scene as "hilarious" and described it as the best part of the episode.

Series co-creator Trey Parker received an Emmy nomination for Outstanding Character Voice-Over Performance for this episode.
