= You're Not Yelping =

- South Park episode
- Episode no.: Season 19; Episode 4
- Directed by: Trey Parker
- Written by: Trey Parker
- Production code: 1904
- Original air date: October 14, 2015

Episode chronology
← Previous "The City Part of Town"	Next → "Safe Space"
- South Park season 19

"You're Not Yelping" is the fourth episode of the nineteenth season and the 261st overall episode of the animated television series South Park, written and directed by series co-creator Trey Parker. The episode premiered on Comedy Central on October 14, 2015. The episode primarily parodies the popularity of Yelp restaurant reviews.

== Plot ==
After a Whole Foods Market opens in South Park, numerous restaurants start to open nearby. When Randy Marsh and Gerald Broflovski are told there is a 30-minute wait for a table at one restaurant, Gerald mentions that he is a Yelp reviewer, and he and Randy are immediately seated. Meanwhile, Eric Cartman, also a Yelp reviewer, extorts free food from a new Mexican restaurant by threatening to give it a poor review. When Cartman is rude to the restaurant owner's son David (pronounced Dah-VEED), who works there as a busboy, David asserts himself to Cartman, but his father warns him not to do so out of fear of receiving bad reviews. When Cartman learns the next day that David is now attending South Park Elementary, he deliberately mispronounces David's name, belittles him, and threatens to lower the rating he gave to the restaurant unless David complies with Cartman's demands and demeaning insults. He also pressures other restaurants into bringing him free food at lunch.

Other Yelp reviewers around town become increasingly excessive in their demands. When the owner of the Whistlin' Willy's family restaurant throws them out in frustration, his business experiences a rise in popularity. Other restaurants follow suit, banning all Yelp reviewers and food bloggers. Angered at what he sees as threats to his exclusive position as a food critic, Cartman calls the bloggers to a meeting at his house but is shocked at the sheer size of the crowd he draws. He rallies them by saying that they need to have one clear leader, not realizing that every member of the crowd sees themselves in that role. The crowd storms Whistlin' Willy's, destroying it and "beheading" the owner by pulling his over-sized mascot costume's head off in a style similar to the beheadings by ISIS. Yelp reviewers all over South Park begin to wage war against restaurants. The next day, Cartman's friends angrily confront him, saying that Whistlin' Willy's was a favorite of theirs.

David refuses to humiliate himself for Cartman's amusement anymore and publicly challenges the Yelp reviewers' leader for a fight, believing he is addressing Cartman. This news quickly spreads, and David, accompanied by Kyle Broflovski, finds himself facing a crowd of all the reviewers at once, each thinking that the challenge was directed specifically at them. Kyle devises a plan to deal with them all: one by one, and without each other's knowledge, each Yelp reviewer is invited into Mayor McDaniels' office and given a golden badge proclaiming them as the most elite food critic in South Park and to ensure that they get the treatment they deserve at restaurants. Restaurants open their doors to the Yelp reviewers again, but begin tainting dishes with bodily secretions such as urine, mucus, semen or feces whenever anyone with a badge places an order. The critics do not notice the tainting, and even Cartman eagerly eats the laced food that David brings to him every day.

== Critical reception ==
IGN's Max Nicholson gave the episode a 6.0 out of 10, and commented that "while Cartman and his legion of food critics offered a handful of laughs early on, 'You're Not Yelping' as a whole felt drawn-out and dull." Chris Longo from Den of Geek gave the episode 2.5 out of 5 stars, summarizing "After three strong episodes, 'You're Not Yelping' gets the lowest ratings from me so far as I’m beginning to think we’re hitting a saturation point with the show getting by on Cartman pointing and laughing at minorities." Writing for The A.V. Club, Dan Caffrey gave an A− rating to the episode, and commented in his review that "it's that exact contrast—this idea of something so trivial treated so dramatically—that makes 'You're Not Yelping' work." Caffrey also noted that the episode as it aired on South Park Studios only had commercials for the Yelp website.

The episode received an Emmy nomination for Outstanding Animated Program.
