= Gluten Free Ebola =

- South Park episode
- A parodic food pyramid model featured in the episode.
- Episode no.: Season 18; Episode 2
- Directed by: Trey Parker
- Written by: Trey Parker
- Production code: 1802
- Original air date: October 1, 2014

Episode chronology
← Previous "Go Fund Yourself"	Next → "The Cissy"
- South Park season 18

"Gluten Free Ebola" is the second episode in the eighteenth season of the American animated television series South Park. The 249th overall episode, it was written and directed by series co-creator Trey Parker. The episode premiered on Comedy Central in the United States on October 1, 2014. The episode lampoons the trend of the gluten-free diet lifestyle and the constant changes recommended to the Western pattern diet and the then-current food guide.

== Plot ==
Following the events of "Go Fund Yourself", Stan, Cartman, Kyle, and Kenny return to school, only to find themselves ostracized for having viciously insulted their friends prior to their startup company. Meanwhile, at a meeting, Mr. Mackey gloats about his newfound gluten-free diet, greatly annoying other staff.

In order to gain back their popularity, Cartman decides to throw a party for a "cause", choosing Scott Malkinson's diabetes. They announce the party over the local radio station WSPIC, with Principal Victoria, who had earlier been converted into gluten-free by Mr. Mackey, asking whether it has gluten-free foods, for which the boys have no response.

Later at the community center, a scientist from the United States Department of Agriculture tries to explain that the rumors about gluten being bad are false by extracting gluten from a piece of dough made of wheat. Mr. Mackey pressures him to drink the gluten sample in order to back the scientist's claims; he complies, and violently dies, sending the entire town into anarchy. Cartman, who's in a panicked state, calls Kyle and tells him that the whole town has taken all the food with gluten and the party cannot happen. The USDA tries to find a way to end the crisis.

At the Marsh residence, two USDA agents enter and find a can of beer in the garbage, which Randy sees no problem with. Unknown to him, beer contains wheat, which ends up getting him quarantined at a Papa John's restaurant with Mr. Garrison and an unnamed civilian. Stan, who has been tasked with getting the pop star Lorde to perform at the party, attempts to ascertain the identity of Randy's co-worker who knows Lorde before Randy is forcefully pushed back inside Papa John's.

Cartman then has a dream of Aunt Jemima (a parody reference to Mother Abigail), who tells him the food pyramids are upside-down, but Cartman has no idea what she is talking about. As the gluten-free toppings at the Papa John's run out, the unnamed resident eats the pizza dough containing gluten, thinking it's all a setup, but he dies shortly afterwards.

At the radio station, Stan, Kyle, and Kenny announced that they have canceled the party to focus their efforts on addressing the public about the dangers of gluten. Cartman, claiming that he knows how to solve the crisis, calls the USDA and tells them that the food pyramid is upside down. Much to their surprise, the new dietary system works. The boys then throw a successful party with Stan reconciling with Wendy, leading her to ask him to dance with her as the credits appended "GF" (gluten-free) to a handful of the cast and crew. Randy Marsh performs as Lorde at the party foreshadowing the next episode.

== Production ==
The idea for the episode came from Trey Parker and Matt Stone noticing how people they work with, and society in general, were going on gluten-free diets. It became so common that they went on diets themselves and thought it would be fun to do an episode mocking themselves.

== Reception ==
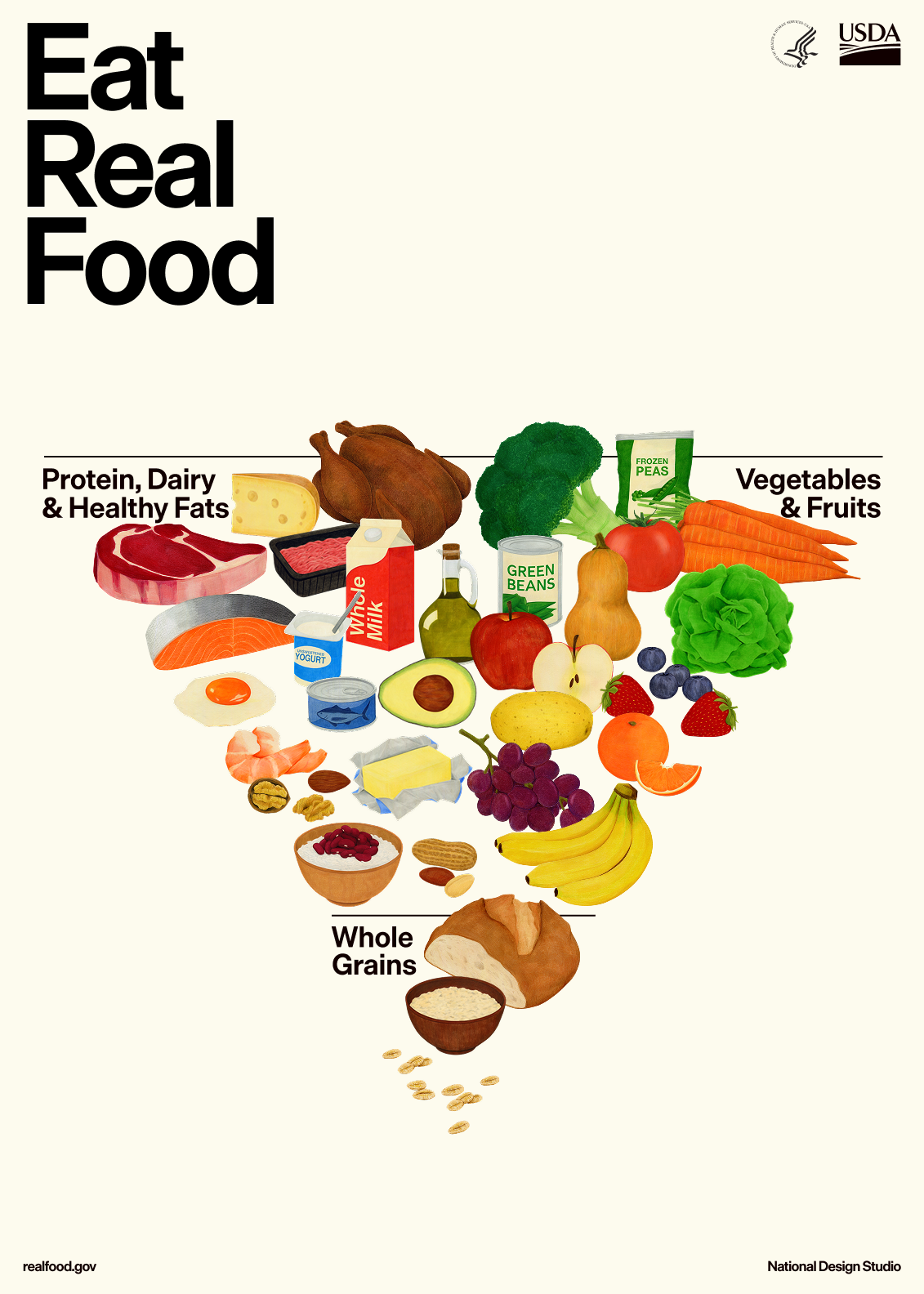
Food pyramid from the HHS' "Eat Real Food" campaign, which has been compared to the episode.

The episode received a C from The A.V. Club's Josh Mordell. Mordell found the gluten-free panic "reasonably funny", but felt the episode lacked a B-story.

Similarly, IGN's contributor Max Nicholson gave the episode a 7 out of 10, praising the panic caused by gluten products, but was also disappointed with the storyline following the boys' party, noting that "the radio show segments were among the least funny South Park moments in recent memory".

Spin magazine's Brennan Carley criticized the Lorde parody, asking: "has Lorde ever really done anything all that worthy of drawing the cartoon creators' ire?" South Park responded by a subplot in the following week's episode "The Cissy", featuring a Spin reporter named "Brandon Carlile" investigating the concert and stating: "It would be a shame if someone was…having fun at her expense."

The episode saw renewed attention in January 2026 when the United States Secretary of Health and Human Services under Robert F. Kennedy Jr. issued a new model of the food pyramid that placed meats, dairy, fats, fruit, and vegetables all at the top of an inverted pyramid. This prompted social media user to claim "Gluten Free Ebola" predicted the inversion of the food pyramid, and the "Make America Healthy Again" movement was just recycling South Park jokes. In response to the comparison, Kennedy's Twitter account @SecKennedy posted an edited clip from the episode where the traditional model was reorganized into the 2026 model.
