= South Park: Phone Destroyer =

Mobile action and collectible card game

- Developer: Ubisoft RedLynx (Note: Additional work by Ubisoft Pune.)
- Publisher: Ubisoft
- Director: Trey Parker
- Producer: Matt Stone
- Writer: Trey Parker
- Composer: Jamie Dunlap
- Series: South Park
- Platforms: iOS, Android
- Release: WW: November 9, 2017
- Genres: Real-time strategy, action, collectible card game
- Modes: Single-player, multiplayer

South Park: Phone Destroyer is a free-to-play real-time strategy collectible card game developed by Ubisoft RedLynx and published by Ubisoft. It was released on iOS and Android on November 9, 2017.

Based upon the American adult animated sitcom South Park, South Park: Phone Destroyer follows the children of the small town as they play a game based around different role-playing games using different themes (Adventure, Sci-Fi, Mystical, Fantasy, Superheroes and Neutral). The player takes the role of The New Kid as previously introduced in South Park: The Stick of Truth and again in South Park: The Fractured but Whole.

== Gameplay ==
The game is played with decks of cards that consist of characters from the South Park television series. Each card costs energy, which restores over time. Mechanically, it is somewhat similar to Clash Royale. There are different versions of each character for every theme which the player can unlock through opening card packs or purchasing them in the Daily Shop or PvP Shop, such as Stan who is dressed as a program from Tron, or Cartman who is dressed as either a sheriff, a grand wizard, a monk, "The Coon" or Awesom-O. Most of the cards have their own special ability with its own unique purpose. Card packs are also purchasable by way of in-app purchases. Other gameplay aspects include real-time player versus player battles and a customizable deck editor, which the player can use to experiment with different card combinations in order to help them progress through the game.

== Plot ==
The kids of South Park argue about a new game for them to play. Cartman, who is dressed as a sheriff, decides the kids should play Cowboys and Indians. The kids initially seem reluctant until Cartman suggests the New Kid can help the Cowboys win the game. Using FaceTime to contact the New Kid, he invites them to come and play by means of using their smartphone which he dubs as a powerful weapon, that can assure their victory. The ending of the game depends on whether the player bought stuff with real money which results in 3 different results to the New Kid's "contributions to the game" (In-App Purchases).

=== Endings ===
==== No Money Spent ====
The kids are disappointed since they knew that people worked hard on the game. Stan then says that he knew they'd get nothing by making the game a "Freemium" one. In other words, the player didn't spend any money on in-app purchases.

==== Some Money Spent ====
Cartman concludes that the money spent is what the New Kid thought it was worth. The kids mull over what they could buy with the money the player spent. Stan then says that they should've charged the players to play the game first like in the old days.

==== A Lot of Money Spent ====
The kids are so happy that the player spent a lot on in-app purchases and Kyle says the player should see someone about mobile game addiction.

== Release and reception ==
South Park: Phone Destroyer was announced at E3 2017, and released worldwide on November 9, 2017. On June 9, 2022, it was revealed on the official South Park Phone Destroyer Facebook page that the game will get its final card release (Legendary rank Dr. Mephesto) and one set of balance changes before an end to all new content. While this is clearly the beginning of the end of the game, the game will continue working with no set end date announced.

The game received a mixed response from critics, according to review aggregator Metacritic. Various outlets deemed the game's freemium status and microtransaction-based mechanics ironic, referencing a 2014 South Park episode "Freemium Isn't Free" that criticized the practice.
