= Cock Magic =

- South Park episode
- Episode no.: Season 18; Episode 8
- Directed by: Trey Parker
- Written by: Trey Parker
- Production code: 1808
- Original air date: November 19, 2014

Guest appearance
- Peter Serafinowicz as Magic: The Gathering match commentator

Episode chronology
← Previous "Grounded Vindaloop"	Next → "#REHASH"
- South Park season 18

"Cock Magic" is the eighth episode in the eighteenth season of the American animated television series South Park. The 255th overall episode, it was written and directed by series co-creator and co-star Trey Parker. The episode premiered on Comedy Central in the United States on November 19, 2014. The episode lampoons the popularity of the collectible card game Magic: The Gathering using double entendres of various sexual innuendo, women's sports, and cockfighting versus the stand for animal rights.

== Plot ==
At school, members of the girls' volleyball team try to gather support for their upcoming game, but Cartman, Craig, Stan, Kyle, and Kenny all turn them down, as Kenny is scheduled to compete in a game of Magic: The Gathering. Kenny wins his game, and the others brag at school about Kenny's brutality in the game. Wendy is disappointed in Stan for not attending the volleyball game. A janitor overhears the boys' talking and gives them information on a more "hardcore" secret underground event. Stan, Kyle, Cartman, and Kenny all arrive at City Wok to find chickens playing Magic in a scene resembling a cockfight, known as "cock magic". Stan, Kyle, and Cartman enjoy the event, but Kenny feels bad for the roosters. Police, led by Detective Harris, arrive at Kenny's parents' home, searching for the cock magic ring. Randy warns the kids about cock magic, as he was involved with it back in college, and he demonstrates his knowledge of a completely different type of "cock magic" by performing magic tricks with his penis. The boys go looking for a rooster they can train to play with the help of Kenny's knowledge. Stan raises questions about animal rights, but the boys eventually choose a younger chicken that has not yet expressed a preference for a fighting style of Magic, and they name their chicken McNuggets. Meanwhile, Randy practices his form of cock magic, since he believes that people are talking about it again.

McNuggets wins a Magic game at City Wok, and the boys are given information on another, more upscale, event. Randy unsuccessfully attempts to entertain a group of children at a birthday party with his cock magic, performing as "The Amazingly Randi". The girls' volleyball coach comes to class to encourage turnout, and Stan, Kyle, and Cartman all joke about it, but Wendy, who is the team captain, also makes a speech and leaves Stan stunned. The parents at the birthday party attempt to report Randy's cock magic show to the police, who are confused as they are looking for the cock magic fighting games, and they arrest the mother for calling in a fake 911 report. Kyle, Kenny, and Cartman bring McNuggets to the next event being held at a Panda Express, but Stan is attending a girls' volleyball game to gain favor with Wendy. The event features an undefeated rooster named Gadnuk, Breaker of Worlds, and the boys realize McNuggets is outmatched, but they are forced to play.

Kenny steps in for McNuggets to play Gadnuk, while Cartman is relaying to Stan all the information via cell phone at the game. Kenny appears to be on the verge of winning the game when the police bust the event. They reveal that they knew about the event due to fliers that had been passed out, which was actually done by Randy, who is performing as The Amazingly Randi for the halftime entertainment. As Randy performs to a stunned crowd, everyone (including Kyle, Cartman, & Kenny) who was involved in the Magic: The Gathering business use the distraction to discreetly escape, eventually leaving only Randy with the police. At school, Kenny wonders what they will do with McNuggets now that his underground fighting career is seemingly over. Stan comes up with the idea to combine the girls' volleyball game against McNuggets playing Magic, as the game finally has the crowd attention they have been wanting all along.

== Production ==
At the end of the production of "Freemium Isn't Free", the sixth episode of this season, Trey Parker and Matt Stone had to quickly come up with what it was that Stan was doing now instead of playing freemium games. They settled on board games. Because it was fun to put some of their favorite board games in the background of that scene, Parker and Stone started discussing doing an episode where the characters play board games, with the twist being that it would be treated like an illegal activity. Also considered was a slightly modified version where instead of it being illegal, the characters played the game like a serious sport. For the game, they chose Magic: The Gathering because Parker had played it before and was a fan of it. Once it was spontaneously decided that roosters would be involved, the term "cock magic" was coined and it set up Randy doing his own cock magic.

Peter Serafinowicz was brought in to do the voice of the announcer. Parker and Stone thought Serafinowicz had a "beautiful voice" so they had him do several different voices to see which would be the best fit. Originally, the voice was done in a low, calm golf announcer voice. Despite being "funny for a little bit", Parker and Stone felt that "the scenes just kind of died out" and the voice had to be funnier. At the "very last minute", it was decided that the voice would be performed in the style of a big and exciting fight announcer where the announcer gets "super excited" after a sudden knockout. Serafinowicz performed the role like an overexcited English football announcer and Parker and Stone were "dying [with] laughter".

== Reception ==
The episode received generally positive reviews from critics. The episode received an A− rating from The A.V. Club's Dan Caffrey, who headlined his review with "The show does away with commentary and ends up with one of the season’s best episodes." Max Nicholson from IGN gave the episode a 6.5 out of 10 and noted that it was "feeling muddled and unfocused". Daniel Kurland from Den of Geek gave the episode 3.5 out of 5 stars and stated: "It might not be the best episode of the season, but it’s a very solid piece of fluff installment in the meantime."
