= Handicar =

- South Park episode
- Episode no.: Season 18; Episode 4
- Directed by: Trey Parker
- Written by: Trey Parker
- Production code: 1804
- Original air date: October 15, 2014

Episode chronology
← Previous "The Cissy"	Next → "The Magic Bush"
- South Park season 18

"Handicar" is the fourth episode in the eighteenth season of the American animated television series South Park. The 251st episode overall, it was written and directed by series co-creator Trey Parker. The episode premiered on Comedy Central in the United States on October 15, 2014. The episode lampoons several trends in the automotive industry including Uber and Lyft, Matthew McConaughey's celebrity endorsement of Lincoln Motor Company, and Tesla, culminating in a Wacky Races-style marathon. It is the fourth episode (The other three being "Terrance and Phillip in Not Without My Anus", "Pip", and "A Million Little Fibers") not to feature any of the four main characters of South Park: Stan Marsh, Kyle Broflovski, Eric Cartman and Kenny McCormick.

== Plot ==
As Gerald and Sheila Broflovski leave a movie theater, some friends tell them that they have hired a Handicar, a new service owned and operated by Timmy Burch. The Handicar is Timmy's motorized wheelchair pulling a decorated wagon behind it. Meanwhile, a South Park resident rides in a taxi driven by an angry Russian driver who complains that taxi service has been declining, as Timmy drives by in his Handicar. Also, a Hummer salesman cannot get customers to come to his sales event, as nearby pedestrians are instead picked up by Timmy.

A group of disabled children are fundraising for summer camp, and Timmy is the leading fundraiser due to his Handicar business. But Nathan, along with his sidekick Mimsy, does not want to go to summer camp considering he got raped by a shark last time, and decides to end Handicar. When a group of taxi drivers and the Hummer salesman meet, Nathan suggests they take out Timmy. The taxi drivers break into Timmy's bedroom and break his legs, which fails since Timmy is already disabled. Nathan calls Timmy and offers to become a Handicar driver, but he plans to sexually harass the first female passenger he gets in order to shut down Handicar. Nathan sexually propositions a female passenger, but the passenger is a transvestite who brutally rapes Nathan in a restroom worse than the shark. Gerald and Sheila hire a Handicar, but they get a normal driver who discloses that Timmy has expanded to anyone who can get a wheelchair and a "handi-cap" (referring to the hat worn as part of the driver uniform). Multiple people are now drivers for Handicar, as Nathan delivers a line reminiscent of Matthew McConaughey's celebrity endorsement of Lincoln Motor Company.

A Tesla event hosted by Elon Musk flops, as the audience only wants to know about Handicar. Musk is met by Nathan and Mimsy who suggest that Handicar be proven inferior to Tesla. Nathan and Musk drive up alongside Timmy and challenge Timmy to a race as a fundraising event. Other vehicle groups join in the race and the news reports the return of the Wacky Races, which have been banned due to their brutality. Timmy is unsure about the race, but the other Handicar drivers (now joined by McConaughey) convince him that it will be best for his fundraising.

The Wacky Races begin and the competitors are: a Lyft car, a Zipcar now driven by McConaughey, the angry Russian and his taxi, the Hummer salesman in a Hummer, Elon Musk with Nathan and Mimsy in a Tesla D (equipped with technology that parodies Professor Pat Pending's Convert-a-Car), Canadian actress Neve Campbell in a pink car with square wheels powered by queefs (who resemble Penelope Pitstop), Timmy and his Handicar, a Japanese self-driving car, and the Wacky Racers characters Dick Dastardly and Muttley. South Park residents watch the live coverage on CNN throughout the morning.

The race rules are to race to a passenger waiting to be picked up and then cross the finish line with the passenger to win. After multiple cartoon incidents in the style of Wacky Races are referenced, Dick Dastardly and Muttley cut down a tree, causing multiple cars to crash, but Timmy picks up the passenger and avoids the roadblock. Nathan, Mimsy, and Musk close in, as Nathan attempts to detonate a bomb placed on Timmy's car, but a fleet of Handicar drivers run the Tesla off the road. Nathan and Mimsy steal Dastardly's car and pass Timmy, but as Nathan activates the bomb, instead the Zipcar is blown up causing McConaughey to be thrown into a wormhole, as Mimsy has planted the bomb on the wrong "fake, soft-spoken douche bag that everyone loves". Timmy wins the race.

As a result of his victory, Timmy sells the rights to Handicar to Elon Musk for $2.3 billion, becoming the summer camp's fundraising champion and making the summer camp fundraiser a huge success. At home, Nathan finally tells his mom directly that he does not want to go to summer camp. However, his mom fakes being able to understand Nathan, as she and her husband have already planned a trip to Italy while he's at camp and she's determined not to let her son ruin it.

== Cultural references ==
Many of the lines by Matthew McConaughey are references to the 2014 Lincoln Motor Company commercials, which he starred in.

== Reception ==
The episode received mixed reviews from critics. The episode received a C+ rating from The A.V. Club's David Kallison. IGN's contributor Max Nicholson gave the episode a 5.0 out of 10.
