= Safe Space (South Park) =

- South Park episode
- Episode no.: Season 19; Episode 5
- Directed by: Trey Parker
- Written by: Trey Parker
- Production code: 1905
- Original air date: October 21, 2015

Episode chronology
← Previous "You're Not Yelping"	Next → "Tweek x Craig"
- South Park season 19

"Safe Space" is the fifth episode of the nineteenth season and the 262nd overall episode of the animated television series South Park, written and directed by series co-creator Trey Parker. The episode premiered on Comedy Central on October 21, 2015. It parodies the idea of safe spaces while also continuing the season-long lampoon on political correctness.

== Plot ==
Cartman is in PC Principal's office crying after receiving negative comments for his appearance in a picture he posted online of himself wearing only underwear and lifting weights. Principal suggests having another student filter out negative comments on Cartman's social media accounts and printing out only the positive comments to Cartman. Cartman agrees and Principal asks Kyle, Wendy, and Butters to filter out the negative comments. Kyle and Wendy get two weeks of detention when they refuse, but Butters, fearful of being grounded by his parents, agrees.

Meanwhile, at Whole Foods Market, Randy is pressured by a cashier to give additional money for poor starving children while paying for groceries. The cashier continues increasingly pressuring him to make donations in his subsequent visits until he finally makes a donation, but is then embarrassed again by the cashier for only giving one dollar to charity.

Principal holds a student assembly featuring guest speaker Steven Seagal, who childishly tells the students that he has also been a victim of body shaming like Cartman. Principal orders Butters to help Seagal in the same manner he has been helping Cartman. Eventually, Butters is filtering negative comments for an increasingly large number of people, including Demi Lovato and Vin Diesel, which requires him to stay up late at night and suffer from sleep deprivation.

Randy films a commercial featuring poor starving children to support his cause to make the supermarket a safe space free of "charity shaming". Cartman, Randy, and others sing an original song about their safe space, with the song introducing the personification of "Reality", who threatens to destroy their safe spaces. Randy and others make a new commercial to support a shameless America in which citizens are not criticized for any of their attributes or actions. In order to pressure the Whole Foods Market cashier to stop asking him for donations, Randy tells him that he is hosting a charity fundraiser dinner for his shameless America. The cashier then asks Randy if he will help put a hamster through college, and eventually Randy replies that his fundraiser is actually aiding the cause of sending hamsters to college, for which the cashier happily wishes him a good day.

Meanwhile, a sleep-deprived Butters begins hallucinating that Reality is appearing in his room and threatening him. This results in a traumatized Butters showing up at school in the nude and jumping out of a window, for which he is hospitalized. The charity dinner, hosted by model Gigi Hadid, is disrupted by Reality, who angrily tells the guests they are all living in denial and informs them what has happened to Butters as a result of their relegating all of the negativity directed towards them to Butters. In response, they make a new commercial to help raise money for iPads for poor starving children so that they can filter negative comments from the fundraisers' social media accounts. At the town center, the citizens opt to have Butters publicly execute Reality by hanging him.

== Critical reception ==
IGN's Max Nicholson gave the episode a 7.3 out of 10 and commented that the storyline with Randy and the supermarket donations "hit its mark this week. Not only was it relatable, but it also touched on some of the same points Cartman's storyline addressed, but in a finer, more innovative way" but felt the episode had a "vague stance". Chris Longo from Den of Geek gave the episode 3 out of 5 stars, and stated that "What’s really paying off in the episode, and this season as a whole, is South Park’s ability to play an issue down the middle." Writing for The A.V. Club, Dan Caffrey gave a B+ rating to the episode, noting the blend of the two storylines was "a strategy that, on top of being comedically surprising, often forces the viewer to keep their own feelings of superiority in check."
