= Rehash (South Park) =

"#REHASH"
- South Park episode
- Episode no.: Season 18; Episode 9
- Directed by: Trey Parker
- Written by: Trey Parker
- Production code: 1809
- Original air date: December 3, 2014

Guest appearance
- PewDiePie as himself (live action)

Episode chronology
← Previous "Cock Magic"	Next → "#HappyHolograms"
- South Park season 18

"#REHASH" is the ninth episode in the eighteenth season of the American animated television series South Park. The 256th overall episode, it was written and directed by series co-creator and co-star Trey Parker. The episode premiered on Comedy Central in the United States on December 3, 2014. The episode is part one of the two-part season finale. The episode lampoons the popularity of Internet Let's Play celebrities and the phenomena of Internet trending topics that lack actual relevance. The episode also references and intertwines multiple elements from previous episodes in the eighteenth season of South Park. YouTuber PewDiePie plays himself in this episode.

== Plot ==
Kyle Broflovski has purchased video games to play with his brother Ike. However, Ike is more interested in PewDiePie's Let's Play videos, much to Kyle's disdain. The popularity of LP is noticed by Eric Cartman, who begins his own commentaries on his classmates. Ike has subscribed to Cartman's CartmanBrah channel, which annoys Kyle. Kyle later invites Ike's friends over to play video games, but they all watch Let's Plays in Ike's bedroom. The children dismiss Kyle, along with Stan Marsh, as out-of-touch "grandpas", and Kyle perceives his living room to be "dying".

Randy Marsh learns of an upcoming benefit concert that will feature a roster of popular musicians, including his secret identity, Lorde. Randy is reluctant to perform due to his reliance on pitch correction software, but his producer reminds Randy that he needs the money due to his son Stan's spending on freemium gaming. Randy relents when his daughter, Shelley, expresses a desire to see Lorde perform, unaware of the truth. At the concert, Randy has second thoughts, but his producer insists that the audience does not care about the performance, telling Randy to "just go out there and pump your hips and rub your clit." Randy notices Iggy Azalea performing with a hologram of Michael Jackson and feels like something is "lost". When Randy's performance begins, his off-key singing and poor live performance disillusion the audience. Randy accidentally sets the Michael Jackson hologram free and then rubs his groin in an attempt to win the audience back, but this only further enrages them and later causes Shelley to tear down her Lorde poster. Randy calls his producer, who says that fame has never been about music, but the publicity generated by performers' antics, Randy being a recent example.

The Jackson hologram boards a bus heading toward South Park, as he needs to "take care of some important business". The Syntech Hologram Company, in response, activates a Tupac Shakur hologram to pursue Jackson.

Randy again contacts his producer, resolving to publicly reveal his identity as Lorde. The producer responds that artists are merely exploited to generate revenue, and that a hologram of Lorde will appear on The Tonight Show Starring Jimmy Fallon, exposing her anus to create more publicity. Seeing Randy as an obstacle to this plan, the producer's henchmen attempt to restrain Randy, who escapes. When Randy informs his wife Sharon of the plan, she is incredulous that she slept with a hologram, which is revealed to be Tupac. Meanwhile, Randy's producer conspires with Cartman to install him as the leader in an upcoming social media revolution involving holograms.

== Production ==
Trey Parker and Matt Stone said on the DVD audio commentary that this episode was originally two separate episodes, one about PewDiePie and one about Lorde. This plan did not materialize because they couldn't figure out an ending that would be long enough to fill up the time for either show. To rectify this, they intended to put them together to make one episode. However, this didn't work either because Parker had written a lot of good material and now felt it needed to be a three-part story arc episode. They considered actually doing this but expected problems with Comedy Central. After shifting back and forth between one episode and three episodes, they finally settled on two partway through the production cycle. In hindsight, they thought it would have been better off if they made it a three-part story.

The scene in which Randy/Lorde is at the concert and gets into a fight with Iggy Azalea was originally going to be used as the final scene for "The Cissy", the third episode of this season. This idea was scrapped with the intention to use it later; it was used in this episode, but with a few modifications. Sia was originally present but was at some point removed and Randy was going to get in a fight with everyone else, not just one person.

The PewDiePie story originated from Parker having similar experiences to Kyle that he had with his step-son. Another influence on the story was that Parker and Stone felt that more people experienced South Park: The Stick of Truth, their video game, through PewDiePie than by actually buying and playing the game themselves. They thought it would be fun to "rip" on this.

Parker and Stone said that making this episode, and the second part, made them feel old, mainly because the episodes deal with newer things that young people are interested in, such as new technology, pop music, and the focus on Internet. This is also where the title came from; things like Twitter, YouTube Let's Play, and the Internet in general, sometimes feel like places where all people do is "rehash each other's shit", an opinion that is shared by several characters in the episode.

== Reception ==
The episode received a B+ rating from The A.V. Club's Eric Thurn, who commented "at first this seemed like a pretty good, if also a bit scatter-brained episode of South Park", but praised the continuity shown in both this episode and the entire season.

Max Nicholson from IGN gave the episode a 7.8 out of 10, stating "in terms of sheer meta-ness, this week's #Rehash was off the charts."

Chris Longo from Den of Geek gave the episode 2.5 out of 5 stars and called it "an episode that throws a lot of fun ideas at us with nothing to balance them out."
