= Where My Country Gone? =

- South Park episode
- Episode no.: Season 19; Episode 2
- Directed by: Trey Parker
- Written by: Trey Parker
- Production code: 1902
- Original air date: September 23, 2015

Episode chronology
← Previous "Stunning and Brave"	Next → "The City Part of Town"
- South Park season 19

"Where My Country Gone?" is the second episode of the nineteenth season of the animated television series South Park, and the 259th episode overall, written and directed by series co-creator Trey Parker. The episode premiered on Comedy Central on September 23, 2015. It parodies illegal immigration to the United States and the 2016 presidential candidacy of Donald Trump, along with Caitlyn Jenner and political correctness.

== Plot ==
Kyle Broflovski is unwillingly honored at the White House by Barack Obama for his acceptance of Caitlyn Jenner (in the previous episode). His reward is to be driven back home by Jenner, who runs over a pedestrian while leaving the White House (in reference to Jenner's real life collision).

Mr. Garrison observes that many Canadians have entered the United States illegally, placing many Canadian students in South Park Elementary. When he reacts intolerantly to a group of them disrupting his class, PC Principal forces the entire faculty to take "Canadian-language" night classes to better help their Canadian students. Garrison reacts to this by composing a song, "Where My Country Gone?" lamenting how illegal immigration has ruined his country. He uses the song to rally the townspeople to his cause. When Garrison interrupts a school presentation on Canadian history, he is fired, stirring tension between American and Canadian students. Eric Cartman and his friends decide that the only way to bring peace is to encourage a romantic relationship between the factions: they appoint Butters Stotch to ask out a Canadian girl.

Garrison gets the entire town behind his proposal to literally "fuck the Canadians to death", then build a wall to prevent further illegal immigration from Canada. However, it is discovered that Canada has already built an immense border wall of its own, to (according to a Canada border guard) prevent Americans from raping Canadian women and preserve Canada's "cool shit". To find out what "cool shit" they are hiding, Garrison sneaks into Canada by going over Niagara Falls in a barrel.

Meanwhile, Butters begins dating a Canadian girl named Charlotte. The two find themselves falling in love. At dinner with her family, he learns that they and other Canadians left Canada unwillingly. Charlotte's father explains that during the last Canadian election there was a brash candidate (a parody of Donald Trump and his positions on immigration) that said outrageous things without offering realistic solutions to problems. Everyone thought it was funny, and thus did not take him seriously as a candidate. He was elected, to their chagrin, because they let the joke go on for too long and neglected to vote against him. After dinner, Butters reveals his romantic feelings for Charlotte, who reciprocates.

Barely surviving his jaunt across the border, Garrison finds that Canada has become a deserted wasteland and heads to the President's office. There, a physical altercation ensues between the two, which ends when Garrison gains the upper hand and rapes the Canadian President to death. Upon hearing the news that the Canadian President is dead, the emigrants – including Charlotte's family – return to Canada. Back in the United States, Garrison attributes the "win" to his policy. Kyle starts to point out that the conflict actually stemmed from such hostile policies but suddenly goes silent because "no one wants another speech". Garrison tells the people of South Park that he will join the 2016 campaign for President of the United States with his running mate, Caitlyn Jenner. The two leave for Washington, D.C. in a car driven by Jenner, who immediately runs over another pedestrian.

== Reception ==
"Where My Country Gone?" received positive reviews. IGN's Max Nicholson gave the episode an 8.0 out of 10, concluding "This week's South Park improved on the first, offering both a scathing satire and a clear target: Donald Trump. With the help of both Mr. Garrison and Butters (and Canadian Donald Trump), 'Where My Country Gone?' proved to be a surprisingly enjoyable entry". Chris Longo from Den of Geek rated it 4 out of 5 stars and said in his review that "this was an episode that should be satisfying even for those who have been put off by the constant flavor of the week references and faux cameos." Writing for The A.V. Club, Dan Caffrey gave an A− rating to the episode, enjoying the way that it had built on the previous episode and the parody of Donald Trump, although finding Caitlyn Jenner's physical appearance "more than a little nasty". Rolling Stone writer Jon Blistein praised Mr. Garrison's campaign to rid America of Canadians as "hilariously ignorant".

== See also ==
- Trump travel ban
- Executive Order 13769
