= Naughty Ninjas =

- South Park episode
- Episode no.: Season 19; Episode 7
- Directed by: Trey Parker
- Written by: Trey Parker
- Production code: 1907
- Original air date: November 11, 2015

Guest appearance
- Bill Hader as Tom

Episode chronology
← Previous "Tweek x Craig"	Next → "Sponsored Content"
- South Park season 19

"Naughty Ninjas" is the seventh episode of the nineteenth season and the 264th overall episode of the animated television series South Park, written and directed by series co-creator Trey Parker. The episode premiered on Comedy Central on November 11, 2015. Continuing the season's theme of political correctness, the plot primarily lampoons police brutality.

== Plot ==
A large number of police are called to South Park Elementary in full riot gear believing that there is a danger there, when actually PC Principal has called them in to silence one child (Leslie Meyers) who has allegedly been speaking during school assemblies. He uses a laser pointer to point out Leslie in the crowd. Officer Barbrady comes in the back door with his gun drawn, causing everyone including PC principal to turn towards him. Getting shined at by PC Principal who still has his laser pointer engaged, Barbrady fires his gun and accidentally shoots a Latino student in the arm, resulting in him being fired by Mayor McDaniels. When Stuart McCormick calls the police because of the violent homeless people in the now-abandoned SodoSopa district, the police refuse to come, as they do not want to be fired as well. Later, Kenny McCormick and Tolkien Black use one of the buildings near Kenny's home to play as ninjas and reveal that they can legitimately scare people away. More kids join this new ninja group and scare away the vagrants from the area, forcing them to relocate from SodoSopa to Shi Tpa Town and the Whole Foods Market, including Barbrady, who has been evicted from his home. Over time, the residents of South Park become increasingly intolerant of the police, including vandalizing their vehicles and refusing service to them.

The news reports that the kids playing as ninjas are actually joining Islamic State of Iraq and the Levant (ISIS) due to the similarity of their clothing, and they are blamed for the increased homeless problem in South Park. Randy Marsh, Gerald and Sheila Broflovski, McDaniels and others go to the police to beg for their help but are refused assistance. The kids receive a video message from ISIS, believing that the message is from a group of real ninjas, and ISIS sends them some money. Meanwhile, McDaniels, Randy and others find Barbrady in the streets and beg him to come back to the police force and shoot the kids that have turned to ISIS. As Barbrady is about to invade the ninja building, Randy realizes that the kids are playing as ninjas and not ISIS members and rushes to stop him. Barbrady decides to talk the children down, genuinely afraid of shooting them. When it seems like the situation will end peacefully, Randy finds and tackles Barbrady, causing Barbrady to shoot another child in the arm, which results in him being fired again. South Park residents agree to turn their backs as the police use their brutality to force the homeless back into SodoSopa. Meanwhile, Barbrady talks with an unknown man who warns him about the changes in South Park, which are apparently part of a plan that involves Leslie, and asks for his help.

== Critical reception ==
IGN's Max Nicholson gave the episode an 8.0 out of 10, noting: "This week's South Park was out for blood on its former self, as the townspeople shunned Officer Barbrady... the only thing that didn't land was the police brutality subplot". Chris Longo from Den of Geek gave the episode 3.5 out of 5 stars and summarized in his review: "it's shaping up to be one of the best seasons in a decade if it can stick the landing". Writing for The A.V. Club, Dan Caffrey rated the episode an A− and noted that "As it turns out, 'Naughty Ninjas' has less to do with institutionalized racism (not in a direct sense anyway) and more to do with people only being compassionate when it suits them. That is to say, they're not actually compassionate at all, which is a theme the show has been exploring all season: this idea of trendy progressivism."
