= Sponsored Content (South Park) =

- South Park episode
- Episode no.: Season 19; Episode 8
- Directed by: Trey Parker
- Written by: Trey Parker
- Production code: 1908
- Original air date: November 18, 2015

Guest appearance
- Bill Hader as Tom

Episode chronology
← Previous "Naughty Ninjas"	Next → "Truth and Advertising"
- South Park season 19

"Sponsored Content" is the eighth episode of the nineteenth season and the 265th overall episode of the animated television series South Park, written and directed by the series co-creator Trey Parker, and is also the first episode of a three-episode story arc that serves as the season finale. The episode premiered on Comedy Central on November 18, 2015. It parodies the abundance of online advertising, native advertising and clickbaits while humorously linking them to artificial intelligence, while continuing its season-long lampoon of political correctness. The story arc of this episode continues into the following episode "Truth and Advertising" and concludes with the episode "PC Principal Final Justice".

== Plot ==
PC Principal is extremely angry over the word "retarded" being used in an op-ed column in the school newspaper and brings the paper's editor, Jimmy Valmer, to his office. Principal demands to review future editions of the newspaper before they are published to eliminate any offensive terms, but Jimmy refuses and accuses Principal of being unknowingly biased towards students with disabilities, a trait known as ableism. Principal states that the newspaper can no longer be distributed on campus, so Jimmy resorts to hand-delivering the paper to homes in South Park, including the fraternity house where Principal lives. Principal is further outraged when he sees that Jimmy's editorial in the newest edition refers to Principal's policy as "retarded".

Stephen Stotch comments to his wife Linda how refreshing it is to be able to simply read the news, without having to deal with the online newspapers, which are filled with sponsored content, clickbait ads and hyperlinks, but she is in a near-catatonic state staring at her smartphone. Principal brings Jimmy in to talk with another disabled student, Nathan, who expresses distress at hearing the word "retarded", but privately Nathan admits to Jimmy that he believes all the changes happening in South Park are not a coincidence and that "a war is coming". At a Presidential debate, Hillary Clinton's physical appearance is attacked by Mr. Garrison and his running mate, Caitlyn Jenner. Garrison and Jenner are then met backstage by Principal Victoria.

PC Principal hosts a party at his fraternity house for disabled people, including Jimmy, Timmy Burch, and others, but they are all marginalized there, as the younger fraternity members seem more interested in having sex with the women there, which they refer to as "crushing pussies". The next day, Jimmy prints an editorial that equates the politically correct term of "PC" to mean "Pussy Crushing". An advertising representative from GEICO offers Jimmy $26 million to allow their sponsored content in the school newspaper, but Jimmy refuses, as he has always declined any ads in the school newspaper. The man threatens to shoot Jimmy, but as he comments about the upcoming war, he is shot dead by Officer Barbrady, who then removes Jimmy from the scene. Randy and Sharon Marsh argue over the PC story in the newspaper, and Sharon finally demands that Randy stop going to their fraternity house, noting that Randy has changed and become more aggressive due to his association with the politically correct crowd.

Jimmy and Barbrady meet with a group of men led by a mysterious stranger (seen in the previous episode "Naughty Ninjas"), who states that online ads have become more intelligent and even anticipate people's desires and needs to the point where they have developed a level of artificial intelligence. Jimmy is tested and shown to have an unusual ability to distinguish actual news stories from online ads, after which he is introduced to a schoolmate named Leslie. Jimmy and Leslie realize that the men they have been speaking with are former news reporters. Victoria, who has been speaking with Garrison and Jenner, reveals that she was never fired, but replaced. Principal removes Jimmy from the school newspaper and replaces him with Nathan. After speaking with Leslie, Jimmy identifies her as an advertisement, while Principal is extremely shocked as he views an online ad featuring himself and Leslie. Jenner drives herself, Victoria and Garrison back to South Park, running over multiple people in the process.

== Critical reception ==
IGN's Max Nicholson gave the episode a 7.8 out of 10 and summarized that the episode "didn't really have the 'epic tie-in' feel it was going for within the larger PC storyline". Chris Longo from Den of Geek gave the episode 4 out of 5 stars and wrote in his review that the episode "hits all the right notes because Matt [Stone] and Trey [Parker] approach the dynamic between the readers, publishers, and advertisers in a way that’s painfully accurate". Writing for The A.V. Club, Dan Caffrey rated the episode an A− and especially enjoyed the sci-fi references in the show, stating: "It also helps that everything’s played with a chilly sterility — Jimmy’s conversation with Leslie feels reminiscent of Blade Runner, Ghost in the Shell, A.I., and any number of other films involving humans and the androids among them — that feels like a true embrace of science fiction rather than a straight-up parody of it."
