= Freemium Isn't Free =

- South Park episode
- Episode no.: Season 18; Episode 6
- Directed by: Trey Parker
- Written by: Trey Parker
- Production code: 1806
- Original air date: November 5, 2014

Episode chronology
| ← Previous "The Magic Bush" | Next → "Grounded Vindaloop" |
- South Park season 18

"Freemium Isn't Free" is the sixth episode in the eighteenth season of the American animated television series South Park. The 253rd episode overall, it was written and directed by series co-creator and co-star Trey Parker. The episode premiered on Comedy Central in the United States on November 5, 2014. The episode lampoons the popularity of freemium mobile apps made by other adult animated series such as The Simpsons: Tapped Out and Family Guy: The Quest for Stuff. The episode links addiction to freemium games to other addictions, including alcoholism and gambling addiction, and their possible genetic predisposition. The episode was nominated for the Primetime Emmy Award for Outstanding Animated Program at the 67th Primetime Emmy Awards.

== Plot ==
Jimmy runs into Kyle at school and tells him about the newest game, a mobile app (which closely resembles games such as The Simpsons Tapped Out and Family Guy: The Quest for Stuff) based on Terrance and Phillip, and encourages Kyle to download it, since it is free. As Kyle plays, he discovers that the game offers freemium upgrades. In Canada, the Prince of Canada and the Minister of Mobile Gaming are amazed at the profits they receive, when Terrance and Phillip enter, angry that their likenesses have been used to make a game without consulting them and how it is not free, since it charges premiums. The Prince and Minister disclose they have purposefully created a boring game based on the concept of mobile RPGs, and that everyone is doing it.

Randy and Sharon Marsh yell at Stan for spending $489 on the app. Randy worries that Stan may have inherited a gambling problem due to Grampa Marvin Marsh having compulsive gambling issues, as Sharon accuses Randy of having his own compulsive issues with alcohol. Terrance and Phillip, after receiving $10,000,000 checks, begrudgingly accept that since everyone is making boring games and earning micropayments for them, then it must be acceptable. Stan is visited by Kyle, Cartman, and Kenny because Stan skipped school just to play. They realize that Jimmy told all of them about the game. Kyle, Cartman, and Kenny confront Jimmy and make him admit that he is being paid to push the game to others. Terrance and Phillip raise concerns about people spending excess money on micropayments, so the Prince and the Minister agree to fund a campaign to play the game in moderation, much like alcohol industry advertisements do. Randy takes Stan to see Marvin, who is addicted to a slot machine, and then confronts Stan and Marvin about their obsessive personalities, as Marvin retorts that Randy is obsessive about alcohol. Stan and Grampa agree to stop their addictive spending.

Jimmy confesses that he has been pushing the game like a drug dealer because he is addicted to another freemium game, and compares freemium games to drug addictions. Stan receives multiple text alerts about the game and cannot stop himself from playing again, now having charged over $26,000, while Randy's alcohol consumption increases. Stan goes to Kyle, Cartman, Kenny, and Jimmy for help. Jimmy encourages Stan to seek out a higher power for help, much like Alcoholics Anonymous and other similar twelve-step programs. Kyle makes a convoluted plan to tell people how Canada has been hiring pushers to get people addicted, but Cartman instead just tweets the information, and it starts trending. Terrance and Phillip again are angered, as the Minister reveals that he had always planned to exploit the addictive nature of people with the game. Stan prays for help, but is visited by Satan, who explains to him what addictions are.

As Terrance and Phillip continue to listen to the Minister explain his plan, the Minister reveals himself to be the Canadian devil, Beelzaboot (a portmanteau of Beelzebub and the Canadian raising pronunciation of "about"). Satan realizes that the game is from Canada (particularly immediately realizing it is from Beelzaboot, despite Satan previously urging him to be more "nuanced" in his temptation), so he possesses Stan (after asking for his permission to do so), then heads to Canada to battle Beelzaboot. Satan defeats Beelzaboot, and Stan is returned to South Park unharmed (to the point his friends react to him literally erupting from the ground in the middle of their basketball game by casually asking if he was okay with vocal indifference). The Prince vows to never produce any more freemium games. While Stan and Marvin play board games to counter their addictive natures, Randy offers to place bets on the outcome, as Stan slams his head on the table in chagrin at Randy's hypocrisy.

== Production ==
Trey Parker and Matt Stone called "Freemium Isn't Free" their favorite episode of the season. On the DVD audio commentary for this episode, they discussed how the episode formed. Parker and Stone had been pitched by several different companies on the idea of creating a freemium mobile game based on the South Park franchise. They were unsure about actually creating the game because they thought the types of games freemium games usually result in were "pretty offensive" in shamelessly asking for money so they decided to do a "shit load of research". During this time, they decided to go ahead and make an episode that revolves around freemium games. The research Parker and Stone did was originally only for fully understanding freemium games but because they had decided to make this episode, the research was very beneficial for the episode.

== Reception ==
The episode generally received above average reviews from critics. The episode received a B− rating from The A.V. Club's Josh Modell, though he felt that it "dragged a lot". IGN's contributor Max Nicholson gave the episode a 7.5 out of 10, commenting that "it took awhile for this episode to get off the ground, but once it did, it was pretty entertaining". However, Chris Longo from Den of Geek only gave the episode 2 out of 5 stars, calling the episode, along with the previous week's episode "The Magic Bush", "the two weakest episodes of the season".

== See also ==
- South Park: Phone Destroyer, a freemium mobile game based on South Park
