= The Cissy =

3rd episode of the 8th season of South Park

- South Park episode
- Episode no.: Season 18; Episode 3
- Directed by: Trey Parker
- Written by: Trey Parker
- Production code: 1803
- Original air date: October 8, 2014

Guest appearance
- Sia as Lorde

Episode chronology
← Previous "Gluten Free Ebola"	Next → "Handicar"
- South Park season 18

"The Cissy" is the third episode in the eighteenth season of the American animated television series South Park. It is the 250th overall episode and was written and directed by series co-creator Trey Parker. The episode premiered on Comedy Central in the United States on October 8, 2014. The episode explores transgender individuals and gender identity. Musician Sia is featured as the AutoTuned voice of Randy Marsh, who is revealed to be the musician Lorde.

== Plot ==
While waiting for the school bus, the thoughts of Eric Cartman are heard as he angrily thinks about the bullying he has apparently experienced, and discusses the item in his pocket, implied to be a gun. Getting tired of the stalls in the boys' room being occupied, he puts a bow on his hat, which was the actual item in his pocket and claims to be "transginger" (a malapropism of transgender) in order to use the girls' toilets at school. Principal Victoria is unimpressed, but Mr. Garrison advises her to give in to avoid the scandal Cartman is almost certain to cause. The girls however are disgusted at Cartman's presence in their toilets, so the school compromises by installing a very fancy transgender toilet in the janitor's room.

Meanwhile, following the previous episode in which Randy Marsh appeared to impersonate Lorde for the children's party, it is now revealed that Randy actually is Lorde, who does not otherwise exist. Randy is struggling to keep this secret from both his wife Sharon, and from a suspicious Spin magazine reporter named Brandon Carlile.

To get back at Cartman for his actions, Wendy uses Cartman's private bathroom by claiming to be transgender herself, using the name "Wendyl". Cartman is furious at losing his private room. After angrily confronting Principal Victoria, Cartman takes his anger out on Wendy's boyfriend Stan by saying dating her makes him gay. Stan, now confused, attempts to discuss gender identity with his father, but Randy misunderstands and instead reveals to Stan that he actually is Lorde. He explains that he started using the women's bathroom at work out of convenience, pretending to be a woman, but eventually found the bathroom to be conducive to creating music. He even shows Stan how he uses home studio software to make himself sound like a woman on a song. This leaves Stan even more confused. At the Geological Survey, Randy/Lorde's boss proposes a separate bathroom to appease the other women at the office; however, Randy/Lorde says the bathroom is critical for his/her musical creations.

E! News reports that Lorde is abandoning music and Spin will reveal the singer's secret. Cartman teases Stan about his gender confusion issues, coining the insult "cissy", based on the term "cisgender". Sharon comforts Randy and indirectly encourages him to continue to express himself as Lorde. Randy completes another, more personal song called "Push (Feel Good on a Wednesday)". Enjoying the music, and realizing the deep personal meaning behind it, the female geologists decide to accept Randy's alias, and Brandon Carlile (the Spin magazine reporter) deletes his exposé on Lorde. The school decides to get rid of the transgender bathroom and allow anyone to use the bathroom with which they are most comfortable, thus foiling Cartman's plans. For those who are bothered by transgender people, a new designation is made to keep them away from the cis people who do not care: cissy bathrooms. Forced by Butters to use that bathroom, Stan begins to appreciate it and sings a song similar to Lorde's.

== Production ==
Series co-creators Trey Parker and Matt Stone had the Cartman gender storyline figured out from the start of the production on the episode, but virtually had nothing else to go with it for much of the production cycle. In "Gluten Free Ebola", the previous episode and second of this season, the boys are still despised for their behavior in the first episode of the season, "Go Fund Yourself". Parker and Stone liked the idea of having a story carry over from one episode to the next so decided to expand on that in doing it again. (More episodes in the future would also feature this theme; the nineteenth season in particular featured this in a major way, with every episode in the season – except for the first – carrying over a story from the previous episode.) The idea from "Gluten Free Ebola" they chose was the scene where Randy pretends to be Lorde. To play with this idea some more for this episode, they decided to make it so that Randy really was Lorde, in part because some reviewers of the previous episode thought this really was the case and gave criticism for it.

The fictional Lorde's song "Push (Feel Good on a Wednesday)" was sung by Sia. Sia confirmed her involvement in an interview with NME in February 2015, and also praised the song written by Trey Parker. Sia assumed that Lorde would "find it funny".

The episode was originally called "Cartman's Bathroom".

== Reception ==
The episode received a B+ from The A.V. Club's Eric Thurm. IGN's contributor Max Nicholson gave the episode a 7.5 out of 10.

Slate's Christin Scarlett Milloy lauded the episode's approach to transgender issues, noting, "when it comes to trans in mainstream media, it seems the tables have finally begun to turn".

Lorde parodied the portrayal of herself in the episode by stating some of the lines her character said. She later stated, "...We actually, in my hotel room, went ‘Ya ya ya ya ya I’m Lorde! Ya ya ya!’ for like an hour..." Lorde, overall, reacted positively towards the episode, posting praise for its themes and humor on her Instagram account.
