= Truth and Advertising =

- South Park episode
- Episode no.: Season 19; Episode 9
- Directed by: Trey Parker
- Written by: Trey Parker
- Production code: 1909
- Original air date: December 2, 2015

Guest appearance
- Bill Hader as Tom

Episode chronology
← Previous "Sponsored Content"	Next → "PC Principal Final Justice"
- South Park season 19

"Truth and Advertising" is the ninth episode of the nineteenth season and the 266th overall episode of the animated television series South Park, written and directed by series co-creator Trey Parker. It is the second part of a three-episode story arc which began with the previous episode "Sponsored Content" and concludes with the following episode "PC Principal Final Justice" that together serve as the season finale. It premiered on Comedy Central on December 2, 2015. Like the previous episode, this episode continues to parody the abundance of online advertising while continuing its season-long lampoon of political correctness.

== Plot ==
After Kyle is called to the principal's office, he finds Mr. Mackey there instead who tells him that PC Principal has lost his mind, with him and his fellow fraternity members going on a hunger strike and that Jimmy and Leslie have both gone missing. Meanwhile, Jimmy explains about how ads have evolved over time, becoming smarter and taking human form, in which Leslie is one of them.

Randy and his family are eating dinner when Randy proposes that the family move out of South Park because it "sucks" now without elaborating. After dinner, Randy explains to Sharon that ever since South Park's revitalization, it has become too expensive to live in and he has taken out a second mortgage on the house to help pay for the expenses. Back at the news base, Jimmy is talking to the newsmen about how he has become attracted to Leslie, despite her being an ad. The newsmen tell him that an ad's purpose is to entice and manipulate people. Jimmy suggests posting the story to the school's newspaper, but is rebuffed as the newsmen tell him to just figure out what the ads are planning.

At South Park Elementary, Stan runs up to Kyle with a school newspaper clipping stating that Principal has sent Jimmy and Leslie on a Disney Cruise for good behavior, but the boys know better as Jimmy was in charge of the school newspaper before being replaced by Nathan. They go to the school newsroom to get answers but are left with nothing after Nathan starts acting stupid to throw them off-course as he directly communicates with the ads on his computer.

Mr. Garrison, Caitlyn Jenner and Principal Victoria arrive at the Whole Foods Market with disguises on and Mr. Garrison is shocked about the state of his town. Back at the news base, Jimmy's attempts to interrogate Leslie fail, leaving him to start accepting her, with the head newsman convinced that he is now "thinking with his dick". At Cartman's house, Stan, Kyle, Cartman, Kenny and Butters search through news articles trying to solve the case, but end up at various stores after getting distracted by pop-up ads. This leads to some tension between Kyle and Stan who strongly believe the other is causing the distraction on purpose to avoid finding out the truth. Randy is ambushed by Garrison, Jenner and Victoria, who then knock him out after they discover a 'PC' tattoo on his buttocks. Back at the base, Leslie tells Jimmy that Principal is the enemy and then places a pop-up ad on the newsmen's monitor so they can not see them. While isolated from the newsmen, Leslie asks Jimmy to help her escape; this sequence references the 2014 artificial intelligence thriller Ex Machina.

At a motel, Randy wakes up tied to a chair being interrogated by the trio, who explain that the political correctness movement is not only happening in the United States, but internationally as well with PC Principal being the cause of it all, and Randy vows to kill him if this is true. Jimmy and Leslie attempt to escape, but are caught by the newsmen with the leader asking Officer Barbrady to kill them both, but Barbrady, not wanting to kill or injure anyone else, aids Jimmy and Leslie in their escape despite accidentally shooting a newsman in the shoulder. At the school, mutual suspicion between Kyle and Stan leads to the two to start arguing and then turning into a physical confrontation.

At the school newsroom, Jimmy and Leslie confront Nathan about his lies, but Leslie betrays Jimmy and brutally assaults him, revealing the fact that Nathan is one of the agents of Leslie and the other ads and proving the newsmen were correct in their warnings to Jimmy not to trust Leslie. At the fraternity house, Randy, Garrison, Jenner and Victoria discover the place abandoned before discovering a computer that Principal used to see the ad featuring him and Leslie. They come to the conclusion that Principal may be trying to help, but they get distracted after looking through the computer and end up at a store just as the boys did earlier. Leslie goes to Kyle's house to ask for his help and last four digits of his Social Security number, and they leave together.

== Critical reception ==
IGN's Max Nicholson gave the episode a 7.2 out of 10 and stated that the episode "was a little sluggish, especially in terms of the main plot. While Jimmy and Leslie's storyline made some headway on that front, the boys came up empty-handed in their investigation – although their sudden transitions to consumerist hotspots were really funny." Writing for The A.V. Club, Dan Caffrey rated the episode a B and stated in his review: "it's a chapter of the increasingly epic season 19 that relies almost entirely on cryptic intentions, shifting allegiances, and general confusion among the characters as they try to unravel who’s really behind the recent madness around town".
