= The City Part of Town =

- South Park episode
- Episode no.: Season 19; Episode 3
- Directed by: Trey Parker
- Written by: Trey Parker
- Production code: 1903
- Original air date: September 30, 2015

Episode chronology
← Previous "Where My Country Gone?"	Next → "You're Not Yelping"
- South Park season 19

"The City Part of Town" is the third episode of the nineteenth season and the 260th overall episode of the animated television series South Park, written and directed by series co-creator Trey Parker. The episode premiered on Comedy Central on September 30, 2015. The episode primarily tackles gentrification and continues the season-long parody of political correctness.

== Plot ==
Following Mr. Garrison's anti-immigration campaigning in the previous episode, South Park is ridiculed by Jimmy Fallon on TV. To counter the bad publicity, the town decides to convince Whole Foods Market to build a store there. This requires passing a thorough inspection with a representative of the firm, so Mayor McDaniels, with the help of Randy Marsh, decides to build a fancy and modern gentrified district, SoDoSoPa ("South of Downtown South Park"). The new district is intentionally built around Kenny McCormick's dilapidated home to appeal to young hipsters who enjoy the "rustic charm" of the scenery. SoDoSoPa runs several commercials (filmed in live action) advertising that all of the new restaurants and shops are "supporting" the original poor residents — when in fact no one in Kenny's family actually works at any of them. Soon the new district starts building middle-class apartment units for customers and employees to live in — all while claiming that this is revitalizing the poor residents that it was simply built around. The new district quickly attracts many people who depart the existing Chinese restaurant, City Wok. Its owner, Mr. Kim, hires a child labor force to try to cut costs, and Kenny manages to get a job in the restaurant.

Meanwhile, the Whole Foods Market representative comes into town and all the citizens try to behave properly to give a good image. After speaking with PC Principal the representative seems to have a good impression of the town. However, when Randy and others find out that Mr. Kim is creating his own gentrified district named CtPa Town (pronounced: "shitty part of town") and hiring children, they mob his restaurant and force the child laborers out, leading to a massive brawl. However, everyone becomes silent when they notice that the representative was observing the fight. He, however, seems to like the energy that the town put in to impress him and decides that the city will have the market. Everyone cheers and leaves, except for Kenny and Kim, who grants Kenny his "child labor wage". Kenny then comes back home and gives his sister a doll paid for by his meager wages. Kenny goes to sleep in his room despite the loud nocturnal noises from SoDoSoPa. The episode ends with a mock commercial featuring the citizens walking inside the new Whole Foods Market — which turns out to be located in CtPa Town, causing SoDoSoPa to be abandoned.

== Production ==
In subsequent episodes in the season, the CtPa Town district had the spelling changed to Shi Tpa Town.

== Critical reception ==
IGN contributor Max Nicholson gave the episode a 7.5 out of 10, noting the episode "wasn't all that outrageous. Not that that's a bad thing, because a lot of the recurring bits here were amusing." Chris Longo from Den of Geek gave it 3.5 out of 5 stars and said in his review in regards to the continuity shown in the series, "South Park as a show is changing with it, and it's changing for the better. Sorry to all the cheesy poof purists, but this South Park is every bit as good as it's ever been." Writing for The A.V. Club, Dan Caffrey gave an A− rating to the episode, and summarized the episode as "a big fuck-you to the PC Police and other assorted critics of the show", adding that "It's a challenge that says 'You want a more tolerant South Park? Here it is.'"
