= Grounded Vindaloop =

- South Park episode
- Episode no.: Season 18; Episode 7
- Directed by: Trey Parker
- Written by: Trey Parker
- Production code: 1807
- Original air date: November 12, 2014

Guest appearance
- Bill Hader as Steve

Episode chronology
← Previous "Freemium Isn't Free"	Next → "Cock Magic"
- South Park season 18

"Grounded Vindaloop" is the seventh episode in the eighteenth season of the American animated television series South Park. The 254th episode overall, it was written and directed by series co-creator and co-star Trey Parker. The episode premiered on Comedy Central in the United States on November 12, 2014. The episode lampoons virtual reality headsets including the Oculus Rift using various science-fiction movie references, and customer service call centers.

== Plot ==
In school, Butters walks around wearing goggles and headphones, believing he is in a virtual reality (VR) setting of his school, when actually Cartman is playing a joke on him and communicating with him via a walkie-talkie. Butters becomes so convinced that he is in a VR setting that he goes home and punches his father, Stephen, in the genitals as payback for all the times he's been grounded, then steals a car in the style of Grand Theft Auto, and tries to assault a prostitute but gets stabbed in the process. Butters wakes up in a hospital without his fake VR equipment. Cartman shows up, dressed similarly to Morpheus from The Matrix and, using dialog similar to Total Recall and magic illusions, convinces Butters that he is still trapped in the VR world since Butters took off the equipment outside of Cartman's room, which was the designated access point. The next day, Cartman receives a phone call from an Indian call center employee calling himself Steve (Bill Hader), from Oculus Rift's technical support, who tells him that he is actually the one trapped in a VR state. Cartman's mother, Liane, walks into Cartman's room and finds him in a catatonic state, hooked up to an Oculus Rift. Though she suggests that he has spent too much time with the device, she leaves his room after putting a meal on his desk.

Cartman confronts Butters, as he's now being grounded, about the call from Oculus Rift and threatens him by saying that whatever happens in VR happens in real life. Kenny takes Kyle and Stan to Cartman's house, where Cartman is still hooked up to the Oculus Rift. Kyle calls customer support and gets Steve again, who tells Kyle that they are doing a "total recall" of all the headsets, due to problems being experienced by them. Kyle and Stan think that this is a prank, but Steve says that one of them will have to put on a headset and attempt to guide Cartman to an access point. Kyle does so, but Cartman tells Kyle that it is actually Kyle trapped in the VR world and that Cartman was sent to save Kyle. Kyle calls the Best Buy store to see who actually purchased the device, but he is transferred to customer service, getting Steve again. Cartman and Kyle are both completely confused.

Stephen and Linda discuss about Butters being grounded, and Stephen cannot remember why he's grounded in the first place. Cartman and Kyle meet with Stan, who is on the phone with Steve, and Kenny, who is unconscious and hooked up to an Oculus Rift. Stan tells Cartman and Kyle that what they are doing is all reality, while Cartman claims that he is a computer program, so one of the others must still be trapped in the VR world. Steve tells Stan that Butters was the first one to call customer service, then Steve calls customer service himself, getting another version of himself on the other end. Steve tells Steve that the call to customer service from within the VR setting has caused a customer feedback loop, which he names a customer service Vindaloop (a portmanteau of Vindaloo and loop). Kyle, Stan, and Cartman go to Butters, but Stephen catches the gang in the room and is upset since Butters is still grounded. Steve is still on the phone with Stan and tells him that the paradox is due to a rule that customer service cannot be contacted from within VR. Steve tells Stan that the crucial question he must answer to resolve the paradox is the one that he has been asking him all along: "Have I answered your questions and provided good customer service?" When Stan finally answers yes, Butters, Stephen, Kyle, and Cartman all disappear before Stephen is about to whip Butters with his belt. Stan realizes he has been the one in the VR setting, and heads back to an access point. Stephen realizes Butters is not grounded anymore and sends him outside to play. As Stan takes off the Oculus Rift, the scene cuts to a live action shot of Kyle, Stan, Cartman, and Kenny, played by actors, at a computer, as Stan praises the Oculus Rift, despite its poor graphics. Shortly afterwards, an over-excited Butters enters the room, hopping up and down, elated to his friends that he's not grounded anymore.

== Production ==
On the DVD audio commentary for "Grounded Vindaloop", Trey Parker and Matt Stone discuss how the episode started: a drawing of Butters in the fake virtual reality headset that Cartman would use to mess with him. Parker said "It just seemed like such a natural way for Cartman to fuck with Butters by putting something like this on his head and telling him that he was in virtual reality when he really wasn't." One reason they stuck with it was because this idea of Cartman fooling Butters for his own entertainment had worked so well in past episodes, citing season seven's "Casa Bonita" as a good example.

Before actually starting work on the episode, Parker and Stone felt that the episode would be "so fuckin' fun" to write because as the episode unfolds, the viewers would be constantly getting confused as to which reality is real and which ones are the simulations. However, when working on the episode, particularly after the first act, Parker and Stone even became confused as to which world is the real world. They said to themselves beforehand that it will work, they'll figure it out later, but when that time came, it was more difficult to put it all together than expected.

Another influence of the episode was that Parker and Stone had been discussing doing something South Park related with virtual reality tools. They had also seen people experimenting with South Park virtual reality games.

== Reception ==
The episode received mostly positive reviews from critics. The episode received a C+ rating from The A.V. Club's Eric Thurm, who commented that he had "no idea what actually 'happened' in 'Grounded Vindaloop'." Max Nicholson from IGN gave the episode an 8.0 out of 10, calling it "easily one of the smartest episodes of Season 18 thus far." Chris Longo from Den of Geek gave the episode 4.5 out of 5 stars and claimed that "an episode like this goes a long way to show that no matter the misstep—like the previous two mediocre episodes—Matt and Trey can get back to what they've done best for 18 seasons."
