= Go Fund Yourself =

- South Park episode
- Episode no.: Season 18; Episode 1
- Directed by: Trey Parker
- Written by: Trey Parker
- Production code: 1801
- Original air date: September 24, 2014

Guest appearance
- Roger Goodell (archive sound) as himself

Episode chronology
| ← Previous "The Hobbit" | Next → "Gluten Free Ebola" |
- South Park season 18

"Go Fund Yourself" is the first episode in the eighteenth season of the American animated television series South Park. The 248th episode of the series overall, it was written and directed by series co-creator Trey Parker. The episode premiered on Comedy Central in the United States on September 24, 2014. In the episode, Stan, Kyle, Cartman, Kenny, and Butters decide to create a startup company funded through Kickstarter so that they never have to work again. While choosing a name, they realize that the Washington Redskins American football team has lost its trademark on "Redskins" because it is racially disparaging to Native Americans, so they decide to use that name for their company. The new company receives enough money for the boys to live luxuriously without doing any work, until the football team destroys Kickstarter's servers during a raid, preventing the boys from accessing their startup company page and receiving their money.

The episode received positive reviews from critics. National Football League (NFL) commissioner Roger Goodell appears as himself via archive sound.

== Plot ==
Stan, Kyle, Cartman, Kenny, and Butters decide to leave school and get rich quick by creating a start-up company through crowdfunding website Kickstarter, but have a hard time getting a name that is not already taken. When Cartman finds out that the Washington Redskins football team has lost the trademark to their team name, he suggests using it for their company. This angers Washington team owner Daniel Snyder, who tries to blackball Cartman. With ISIS supporting them, Kyle and Stan leave to form their own startup company, which Stan eventually also quits.

Snyder, increasingly frustrated, asks other NFL owners to use their connections to have Cartman change his company's logo. Cartman responds by adding hand-drawn breasts, testicles and a penis to the Redskins logo. This leads Snyder and his team to break into the Kickstarter headquarters and burn it to the ground. Cartman, Kyle, and Stan lose the money from their Kickstarter projects, but reconcile and refurbish their company into a replacement for Kickstarter to make money off their clients. Everything goes well for the boys until the Redskins' game against the Dallas Cowboys when Snyder himself is forced to play in place of his disillusioned team and is severely wounded. Taking pity on the team owner, the townspeople form a mob against the boys' company (including ISIS), threatening to boycott them unless the boys change the name and go back to school.

== Production ==
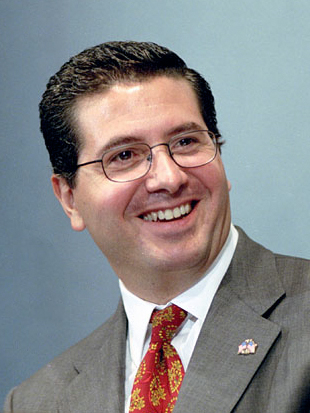
Washington Redskins owner Daniel Snyder is mocked in the episode for his stance on maintaining his franchise's team name

Trey Parker and Matt Stone wanted to spoof the Washington Redskins name controversy, thinking that the controversy would be "the big issue" in the National Football League that season. Several scenes were complete and it was decided that this would be the first episode of the season. However, around a week before air, the Ray Rice domestic violence incident happened. Parker and Stone felt that this complicated matters; they felt the Redskins controversy wasn't the big story anymore and if they aired the episode as is, people would wonder why they didn't spoof Ray Rice in an episode about the NFL. As a result, much of the episode was modified trying to find a way to fit this story in. Eventually, Parker and Stone settled on referencing the Rice incident rather than making it a major theme, and finishing the episode how they originally intended, focusing on the Redskins and Kickstarter.

The episode was originally titled "Piling On", alluding to the fact that "everyone was talking about" the NFL and a South Park episode about it would be "piling it on". Its eventual title references the website GoFundMe and is a pun of the phrase "Go fuck yourself".

Parker originally drew a penis and breasts on a Redskins logo on a whiteboard in the writers room for fun. Everybody thought it was genius and it provided inspiration to finish the episode.

The scene in which Dan Snyder sheds a tear while looking towards the camera is a parody of the famous 1970s commercial "Keep America Beautiful", which features "The Crying Indian". To make the owner's head turn towards the camera in a way that mimics the ad campaign, the animators needed to build a series of special head poses.

== Promotion ==
To promote the episode, Comedy Central purchased commercial time on Fox owned-and-operated station WTTG in Washington, D.C. while it aired the Redskins' game against the Philadelphia Eagles on September 21, 2014. The teaser features Snyder, head coach Jay Gruden and quarterback Robert Griffin III confronting Cartman about using the Washington Redskins name. However, it was Kirk Cousins who appeared in the actual episode to reflect the fact he had replaced Griffin on the field while the latter recovered from an ankle injury.

== Reception ==
The episode received a B− rating from The A.V. Club's Eric Thurm. Thurm praised the episode's parody of recent controversy in the NFL, but also criticized its startup satire for "happening at the basest level possible". IGN's Max Nicholson gave the episode a score of 8 out of 10 and called it "an enjoyable half-hour of TV", particularly commending the prevalent cultural references.
