= Tweek x Craig =

- South Park episode
- Episode no.: Season 19; Episode 6
- Directed by: Trey Parker
- Written by: Trey Parker
- Production code: 1906
- Original air date: October 28, 2015

Episode chronology
← Previous "Safe Space"	Next → "Naughty Ninjas"
- South Park season 19

"Tweek x Craig" is the sixth episode of the nineteenth season and the 263rd overall episode of the animated television series South Park, written and directed by series co-creator Trey Parker. The episode premiered on Comedy Central on October 28, 2015. The episode parodies the slash fiction genre of yaoi art and the acceptance of the gay community, while continuing its season-long lampoon of political correctness.

== Plot ==
PC Principal and Wendy host an assembly to introduce students to the Asian art of yaoi, which has increased due to the influx of Asian students. The pictures shown are all manga-style drawings of Tweek and Craig engaged in homoerotic and homosexual activity, and the gang is confused at this. Tweek and Craig are brought in to Principal's office where they both assert that they are not gay, but Principal ignores their denial and tells them that if there is a relationship between them, they must have affirmative consent. Stan talks with his father Randy about his confusion over who "the Asians" arbitrarily decide to portray as gay in yaoi. Randy, who knows nothing about the topic but is desperate to appear politically correct, comes to the conclusion that Asians are allowed to decide who is actually gay or not. Meanwhile, Randy is thrilled at the appearance/coming out of the closet of the "gay couple", citing the Whole Foods Market in town as part of the reason.

At Whole Foods, Craig's father Thomas is congratulated for Craig being gay, but he is unwilling to accept this. At Tweek's home, Tweek's parents celebrate and accept his gay status by rewarding him with money. As Cartman ponders the relationship of Tweek and Craig, he starts fantasizing again about his Cupid-like alter ego Cupid Me (last seen in "Cartman Finds Love"). Cupid Me visits Craig in his sleep and shoots him with a love arrow to help with their relationship. Cupid Me then begins to express his homosexual feelings for Cartman, who rejects him. The next day at school, the growing tension between Tweek and Craig leads to them fighting, but it is dismissed as a lovers' quarrel, and they are given money and dismissed without punishment.

When Randy calls General Secretary of the Chinese Communist Party Xi Jinping to ask for clarifications about yaoi, the Chinese leader angrily replies that the Japanese, not Chinese, do this and begins ranting about the rape of Nanking. As Thomas turns to alcohol, Randy tells him that he has no control over whether or not Craig is gay: it is the Japanese who make those decisions and they even got away with "raping Don King"; at the same time, Kyle explains to Stan and several other students what yaoi really is: an art form "created by girls for girls" as a perverse way to make men seem attractive. Craig convinces Tweek to announce that they are gay and then stage a fake breakup in order to put the matter to rest. Initially reluctant, Tweek gets carried away with the performance, portraying Craig as a manipulative cheater and himself as the wronged party. Craig becomes massively unpopular, with yaoi artists getting even more inspired by Tweek's heartbreak and the town's residents becoming severely depressed.

Cartman meets Cupid Me at a gay bar to ask him for help, and Cupid Me agrees but insists on having a date with Cartman as payment. Tweek apologizes to Craig for making him appear to be manipulative but Craig pushes him away and rejects his idea to pretend to get back together. Thomas becomes willing to accept his son's sexuality thanks to a love arrow shot by Cupid Me, and encourages Craig to be gay and gives him money. Tweek and Craig make amends and begin holding hands together in public and playing games together, bringing joy back to the town. Meanwhile, Cartman has his date with Cupid Me, which involves a massage in his bed. As Cupid Me attempts to molest Cartman, Cartman is revealed to be alone in his bathroom masturbating, having hallucinated Cupid Me the entire episode.

== Production ==
Prior to the airing of the episode, producers solicited viewers to submit yaoi-style fan art drawings of Tweek and Craig, which were incorporated into the episode.

== In other media ==
There is a side-mission for collecting yaoi art of Tweek and Craig for Craig's dad in the 2017 role-playing video game South Park: The Fractured but Whole.

== Reception ==
IGN's Max Nicholson gave the episode an 8.5 out of 10, and commented in his review that the yaoi theme "resulted in one of the funniest episodes of South Park for [him] in recent memory – definitely this season". Chris Longo from Den of Geek gave the episode 3 out of 5 stars and stated that "Slowly turning the town of South Park into a liberal bastion of modern Millennial and social media values has opened a whole new side of not just the town folks, but of Matt and Trey's humor. Yeah, the [South Park] residents are still bigoted shit-kickers, but now their hearts are in the right place." Writing for The A.V. Club, Dan Caffrey noted that he did not know of the actual existence of Tweek and Craig yaoi art, while giving the episode an A− rating and commenting: "if anything, 'Tweek x Craig' is critical not of homophobia, but of something much more general, something that's become the target of many, many South Park episodes since the show first aired: following a trend without doing the research".

Series co-creator Matt Stone received an Emmy nomination for Outstanding Character Voice-Over Performance for this episode.
