= Craig Tucker =

Fictional character from the TV series South Park

- South Park character
- First appearance: "Mr. Hankey, the Christmas Poo" (1997)
- Created by: Trey Parker; Matt Stone
- Designed by: Trey Parker; Matt Stone
- Voiced by: Matt Stone

In-universe information
- Alias: Super Craig
- Gender: Male
- Occupation: Elementary school student
- Family: Laura Tucker (mother); Thomas Tucker (father); Tricia Tucker (sister)
- Significant other: Tweek Tweak
- Religion: Roman Catholic
- Education: South Park Elementary
- Residence: South Park, Colorado, United States

Craig Tucker is a fictional character in the adult animated television series South Park. He is voiced by series co-creator Matt Stone. One of the main characters' fourth-grade classmates, he debuted in the season one episode "Mr. Hankey, the Christmas Poo" singing "We Wish You a Merry Christmas" with the rest of the third-grade class. His speaking debut was in "Rainforest Shmainforest". A pragmatist, Craig commonly strays from the plans of the main characters in favor of more practical, realistic approaches and solutions to main issue.

== Appearance ==
Craig is commonly seen wearing a blue aviator or chullo hat. He is characterized by this and his slightly more deep, nasal, monotone voice. In some scenes, including during a head lice check in "Lice Capades", Craig is seen with no hat and black hair. He is also seen as a stereotypical metrosexual in "South Park is Gay!", and an anime-styled ninja wielding a katana in "Good Times with Weapons".

== Biography ==
=== Inception ===
In the beginning of South Park, Craig was said to be the most violent and strongest student in the third-grade class (excluding Cartman). Cartman once claimed that Craig was the "biggest troublemaker in class", and parents of his classmates have cited him as a "bad influence". In a running gag during the show's earlier seasons, establishing shots of Mr. Mackey's office would feature Craig waiting outside, yet his activities were never seen. In the first several seasons, Craig has a habit of giving people the finger, a trait the show's official website attributes to his learning the behavior from his family, all of whom frequently use the gesture as well, most notably in the third season episode, "Tweek vs. Craig", in which his entire family take turns flipping each other off at the dinner table. This trait was used less throughout the show's runtime, and was last seen in the episode "Fun with Veal". Along with the rest of the characters, Craig moved to the fourth grade in "Fourth Grade".

==== Rivalry with the main characters ====
Craig dislikes the four main characters (Stan Marsh, Kyle Broflovski, Kenny McCormick and Eric Cartman) and rivals them in several episodes. Craig is a pragmatist and has no wish to become involved in any extraordinary adventures the other main characters on the show customarily experience. In the season 12 (2008) episodes "Pandemic" and "Pandemic 2: The Startling", Craig repeatedly castigates the main characters' propensity for engaging in schemes that catastrophically backfire upon them. He also complains that they just seem to blindly accept that these things happen to them. He decides that he will no longer participate in such schemes, and walks away from the one in which they find themselves in the latter episode. However, by taking this action he fulfills an ancient prophecy, by stepping on a mysterious platform that allows him to defeat the giant guinea pig monster responsible for that story line's conflict. He concludes from this that just because there are things in life that cannot be controlled does not mean that one should accept them without protest.

==== "Craig's gang" ====
Despite his dislike of the main characters, particularly Cartman, he is often depicted as one of the boys who repeatedly join Cartman in his many schemes, at times serving as a right-hand man. According to the creators of South Park, Craig's best friend is his classmate Tolkien Black. In "We Be Clubbin'", Craig and Tweek state that they were "best friends", likely because their youth mixes romantic and platonic bonds together. He is also close friends with Clyde Donovan and Jimmy Valmer, who are members of Craig's clique known as "Craig's gang".

Members of "Craig's gang" include:

- Craig Tucker
- Tolkien Black
- Clyde Donovan
- Jimmy Valmer
- Tweek Tweak
- Jason White (former)
- Butters Stotch (former)

=== Homosexuality and relationship with Tweek Tweak ===
In the Season 19 episode "Tweek x Craig", female students of Asian backgrounds started drawing homoerotic "yaoi" images of Craig and his classmate Tweek Tweak, depicting them as lovers (an acknowledgement of amors about them). Prompted by this, they eventually resolve to stage a public "break-up" to end the rumors. Though Tweek fears he cannot do this believably, Craig encourages him that he indeed can. However, Tweek goes too far by claiming that Craig is a manipulative cheater, which has the effect of ruining Craig's reputation with girls. Tweek later reveals that Craig's encouragement gave him the confidence to believe in himself. Following the father-to-son talk between him and his father about how "you can't fight being gay", the two boys have been in a relationship. In later episodes, such as the season 21 episode "Put It Down", season 21 episode "Splatty Tomato", and the video game The Fractured but Whole, they are shown to have become sincere romantic partners but their sexuality remains ambiguous, as they are still under the impression that Japanese yaoi fangirls choose who is gay. They are often seen in the background of many episodes holding hands or being next to each other. Craig calls Tweek "babe" and "honey" in the episode "Put It Down." Also in the Post Covid specials, they are shown to be married.

== Reception ==
On a 2022 top 25 list, Looper ranked Craig #13. CBR pointed out that "Craig has gradually become more of a supporting player to the boys" and ranked him on #5 of "10 Characters who Got Way More Popular Since the Beginning". Michael John-Day of WhatCulture ranked Craig as the 2nd most "underrated" South Park character in 2020.

For his performance as both Craig and Tweek in the episode “Tweek x Craig,” Stone was nominated for the Primetime Emmy Award for Outstanding Character Voice-Over Performance at the 68th Primetime Creative Arts Emmy Awards in 2016.

== Appearances in other media ==
He plays the role of a Rogue in South Park: The Stick of Truth and plays the role of Super Craig in South Park: The Fractured but Whole (a parody of Superman from DC Comics).
