= South Park season 19 =

Season of television series

South Park
- Season 19
- Home media release cover
- No. of episodes: 10

Release
- Original network: Comedy Central
- Original release: September 16 – December 9, 2015

Season chronology
- ← Previous; Season 18 Next → Season 20

The nineteenth season of the American animated sitcom South Park premiered on Comedy Central on September 16, 2015, and ended on December 9, 2015, containing ten episodes. As with most seasons of the show, all episodes are written and directed by series co-creator and co-star Trey Parker. The Blu-Ray and DVD sets were released exclusively to Best Buy on August 16, 2016, and were available worldwide on September 6.

Much like the previous season, this season features an episode-to-episode continuity, (which the creators called 'serialized lite') with political correctness as a recurring theme. This season introduced PC Principal as a new major character, replacing South Park Elementary's previous principal, Principal Victoria.

This season featured planned "dark weeks", weeks where no new episodes aired. These were after episode three, episode six, and episode eight.

== Episodes ==
No. overall	No. in season	Title	Directed by	Written by	Original release date	Prod. code	U.S. viewers (millions)
258	1	"Stunning and Brave"	Trey Parker	Trey Parker	September 16, 2015	1901	1.76
A new principal at South Park Elementary makes the gang face their politically-incorrect past as they realize a new appreciation for Caitlyn Jenner.
259	2	"Where My Country Gone?"	Trey Parker	Trey Parker	September 23, 2015	1902	1.49
Mr. Garrison is angered by illegal Canadian immigrants coming into town and decides to build a wall to keep them all out, leading him to run for the 2016 U.S. Presidency.
260	3	"The City Part of Town"	Trey Parker	Trey Parker	September 30, 2015	1903	1.32
As the town of South Park is gentrifying around him, Kenny gets a job at City Wok, only to learn that gentrification hurts cities more than helps them.
261	4	"You're Not Yelping"	Trey Parker	Trey Parker	October 14, 2015	1904	1.37
Cartman considers himself the top online restaurant reviewer in South Park.
262	5	"Safe Space"	Trey Parker	Trey Parker	October 21, 2015	1905	1.21
Cartman is the latest victim of body shaming. Meanwhile, Randy is strong armed into giving to charity.
263	6	"Tweek x Craig"	Trey Parker	Trey Parker	October 28, 2015	1906	1.34
After Wendy gives a presentation on yaoi, news of a romantic relationship between Tweek and Craig hits South Park Elementary.
264	7	"Naughty Ninjas"	Trey Parker	Trey Parker	November 11, 2015	1907	1.42
The citizens of South Park decide they no longer need a police force in town.
265	8	"Sponsored Content"	Trey Parker	Trey Parker	November 18, 2015	1908	1.30
Jimmy's position as editor of the school newspaper conflicts with PC Principal's views.
266	9	"Truth and Advertising"	Trey Parker	Trey Parker	December 2, 2015	1909	1.43
PC Principal disappears with two of the 4th grade students as residents investigate the changes happening to South Park.
267	10	"PC Principal Final Justice"	Trey Parker	Trey Parker	December 9, 2015	1910	1.83
Kyle has chosen a dangerous alliance over his friendship with Stan.

== Reception ==
James Poniewozik of The New York Times considered it a revitalizing season for the series, praising its "ambitious, serialized story" and characterizing it as "something like a grand—if messy—unified theory of anger, inequality and disillusionment in 2015 America."

== See also ==
- South Park (Park County, Colorado)
- South Park City
