= List of South Park episodes =

South Park is an American animated television sitcom created by Trey Parker and Matt Stone for Comedy Central. Parker and Stone developed the series from two animated shorts both titled The Spirit of Christmas (1992, 1995), and was originally developed for Fox. The series was later acquired by Comedy Central, which premiered South Park on August 13, 1997. Produced for an adult audience, South Park became infamous for its profanity and dark, surreal humor that satirizes a wide range of topics. The series revolves around four boys—Stan Marsh, Kyle Broflovski, Eric Cartman, and Kenny McCormick—and their adventures in and around the eponymous Colorado town.

South Park has received multiple accolades, including three Annie Award nominations (with one win), two Critics' Choice Television Award nominations, 17 Emmy Award nominations (with five wins), 3 TCA Awards nominations, and a Peabody Award. The first twenty-six seasons and all special episodes have been released on DVD and Blu-ray, in addition to several compilation releases.

On August 5, 2021, Comedy Central announced that Parker and Stone signed a $900 million deal for extending the series to 30 seasons through 2027. The deal also included a series of 14 films for Paramount+, which are released twice per year. Parker and Stone later denied that the projects were films, and clarified that it was ViacomCBS which decided to advertise them as such. Paramount+ advertises the projects as "exclusive events", and they are generally accepted to be television specials. On July 23, 2025, it was reported that Parker and Stone signed a $1.5 billion deal with Paramount Global to make 50 new episodes through 2030, while also having the entire series exclusively available on the streaming service Paramount+ worldwide.

As of November 11, 2026, 343 episodes of South Park have aired, including seven specials, currently in its twenty-ninth season.

== Series overview ==
Season	Episodes	Originally released		
Season	Episodes	First released	Last released	Network
1	13	August 13, 1997	February 25, 1998	Comedy Central
2	18	April 1, 1998	January 20, 1999	Comedy Central
3	17	April 7, 1999	January 12, 2000	Comedy Central
4	17	April 5, 2000	December 20, 2000	Comedy Central
5	14	June 20, 2001	December 12, 2001	Comedy Central
6	17	March 6, 2002	December 11, 2002	Comedy Central
7	15	March 19, 2003	December 17, 2003	Comedy Central
8	14	March 17, 2004	December 15, 2004	Comedy Central
9	14	March 9, 2005	December 7, 2005	Comedy Central
10	14	March 22, 2006	November 15, 2006	Comedy Central
11	14	March 7, 2007	November 14, 2007	Comedy Central
12	14	March 12, 2008	November 19, 2008	Comedy Central
13	14	March 11, 2009	November 18, 2009	Comedy Central
14	14	March 17, 2010	November 17, 2010	Comedy Central
15	14	April 27, 2011	November 16, 2011	Comedy Central
16	14	March 14, 2012	November 7, 2012	Comedy Central
17	10	September 25, 2013	December 11, 2013	Comedy Central
18	10	September 24, 2014	December 10, 2014	Comedy Central
19	10	September 16, 2015	December 9, 2015	Comedy Central
20	10	September 14, 2016	December 7, 2016	Comedy Central
21	10	September 13, 2017	December 6, 2017	Comedy Central
22	10	September 26, 2018	December 12, 2018	Comedy Central
23	10	September 25, 2019	December 11, 2019	Comedy Central
24	2	September 30, 2020	March 10, 2021	Comedy Central
Specials	2	November 25, 2021	December 16, 2021	Paramount+
25	6	February 2, 2022	March 16, 2022	Comedy Central
Specials	2	June 1, 2022	July 13, 2022	Paramount+
26	6	February 8, 2023	March 29, 2023	Comedy Central
Specials	3	October 27, 2023	May 24, 2024	Paramount+
27	5	July 23, 2025	September 24, 2025	Comedy Central
28	5	October 15, 2025	December 10, 2025	Comedy Central
29	6	September 16, 2026	November 25, 2026	Comedy Central

== Episodes ==
=== Season 1 (1997–1998) ===
No. overall	No. in season	Title	Directed by	Written by	Original release date	Prod. code	U.S. viewers (millions)
1	1	"Cartman Gets an Anal Probe"	Trey Parker	Trey Parker & Matt Stone	August 13, 1997	101	0.89
2	2	"Volcano"	Trey Parker & Matt Stone	Trey Parker & Matt Stone	August 20, 1997	103	1.11
3	3	"Weight Gain 4000"	Trey Parker & Matt Stone	Trey Parker & Matt Stone	August 27, 1997	102	0.72
4	4	"Big Gay Al's Big Gay Boat Ride"	Trey Parker	Trey Parker & Matt Stone	September 3, 1997	104	0.69
5	5	"An Elephant Makes Love to a Pig"	Trey Parker (uncredited)	Trey Parker, Matt Stone & Dan Sterling	September 10, 1997	105	1.29
6	6	"Death"	Matt Stone	Trey Parker & Matt Stone	September 17, 1997	106	1.13
7	7	"Pinkeye"	Trey Parker & Matt Stone	Trey Parker, Matt Stone & Philip Stark	October 29, 1997	107	2.67 1.73 (HH) (Note: (HH) indicates the amount of households an episode was viewed in when it premiered.)
8	8	"Starvin' Marvin"	Trey Parker	Trey Parker	November 19, 1997	109	3.68 2.20 (HH)
9	9	"Mr. Hankey, the Christmas Poo"	Trey Parker & Matt Stone	Trey Parker	December 17, 1997	110	4.55
10	10	"Damien"	Trey Parker	Trey Parker & Matt Stone	February 4, 1998	108	5.55 3.01 (HH)
11	11	"Tom's Rhinoplasty"	Trey Parker (uncredited)	Trey Parker	February 11, 1998	111	4.68 2.87 (HH)
12	12	"Mecha-Streisand"	Trey Parker	Trey Parker, Philip Stark & Matt Stone	February 18, 1998	112	5.38 3.21 (HH)
13	13	"Cartman's Mom Is a Dirty Slut"	Trey Parker	Trey Parker & David R. Goodman	February 25, 1998	113	5.40 3.20 (HH)

=== Season 2 (1998–1999) ===
No. overall	No. in season	Title	Directed by	Written by	Original release date	Prod. code	U.S. viewers (millions)
14	1	"Terrance and Phillip in Not Without My Anus"	Trey Parker	Trisha Nixon & Trey Parker	April 1, 1998	201	5.55 3.25 (HH) (Note: (HH) denotes that the numbers listed are the amount of households the episode was viewed in.)
15	2	"Cartman's Mom Is Still a Dirty Slut"	Trey Parker	David Goodman & Trey Parker	April 22, 1998	202	6.20 4.00 (HH)
16	3	"Ike's Wee Wee"	Trey Parker	Trey Parker	May 20, 1998	204	4.89 2.95 (HH)
17	4	"Chickenlover"	Trey Parker	Trey Parker, Matt Stone & David Goodman	May 27, 1998	203	4.56 2.71 (HH)
18	5	"Conjoined Fetus Lady"	Trey Parker	Trey Parker, Matt Stone & David Goodman	June 3, 1998	205	3.95 2.57 (HH)
19	6	"The Mexican Staring Frog of Southern Sri Lanka"	Trey Parker	Trey Parker & Matt Stone	June 10, 1998	206	4.16 2.57 (HH)
20	7	"City on the Edge of Forever" "Flashbacks"	Trey Parker	Trey Parker & Nancy M. Pimental	June 17, 1998	207	4.80 3.06 (HH)
21	8	"Summer Sucks"	Trey Parker	Nancy M. Pimental & Trey Parker	June 24, 1998	208	3.87 2.53 (HH)
22	9	"Chef's Chocolate Salty Balls"	Trey Parker	Trey Parker, Matt Stone & Nancy M. Pimental	August 19, 1998	209	5.27 3.26 (HH)
23	10	"Chickenpox"	Trey Parker	Trey Parker, Matt Stone & Trisha Nixon	August 26, 1998	210	4.99 3.07 (HH)
24	11	"Roger Ebert Should Lay Off the Fatty Foods"	Trey Parker	Trey Parker & David Goodman	September 2, 1998	211	4.09 2.56 (HH)
25	12	"Clubhouses"	Trey Parker	Trey Parker & Nancy M. Pimental	September 23, 1998	212	3.49 2.57 (HH)
26	13	"Cow Days"	Trey Parker	Trey Parker & David Goodman	September 30, 1998	213	3.42 2.59 (HH)
27	14	"Chef Aid"	Trey Parker	Trey Parker & Matt Stone	October 7, 1998	214	3.21 2.13 (HH)
28	15	"Spookyfish"	Trey Parker	Trey Parker	October 28, 1998	215	4.91 3.11 (HH)
29	16	"Merry Christmas, Charlie Manson!"	Eric Stough	Trey Parker & Nancy M. Pimental	December 9, 1998	216	3.28
30	17	"Gnomes"	Trey Parker	Pam Brady, Trey Parker & Matt Stone	December 16, 1998	217	3.01 2.06 (HH)
31	18	"Prehistoric Ice Man"	Eric Stough	Trey Parker & Nancy M. Pimental	January 20, 1999	218	3.60 2.37 (HH)

=== Season 3 (1999–2000) ===
No. overall	No. in season	Title	Directed by	Written by	Original release date	Prod. code	U.S. viewers (millions)
32	1	"Rainforest Shmainforest"	Trey Parker & Eric Stough	Trey Parker & Matt Stone	April 7, 1999	301	3.41 2.32 (HH) (Note: (HH) denotes that the numbers listed are the amount of households the episode was viewed in.)
33	2	"Spontaneous Combustion"	Matt Stone	Trey Parker, Matt Stone & David Goodman	April 14, 1999	302	3.28 2.29 (HH)
34	3	"Succubus"	Trey Parker	Trey Parker	April 21, 1999	303	2.55 1.89 (HH)
35	4	"Jakovasaurs"	Matt Stone	Trey Parker, Matt Stone & David Goodman	June 16, 1999	305	2.92 2.07 (HH)
36	5	"Tweek vs. Craig"	Trey Parker	Trey Parker	June 23, 1999	304	2.81 1.87 (HH)
37	6	"Sexual Harassment Panda"	Eric Stough	Trey Parker	July 7, 1999	306	2.86 1.83 (HH)
38	7	"Cat Orgy"	Trey Parker	Trey Parker	July 14, 1999	307	2.98
39	8	"Two Guys Naked in a Hot Tub"	Trey Parker	Trey Parker, Matt Stone & David Goodman	July 21, 1999	308	2.97 2.03 (HH)
40	9	"Jewbilee"	Trey Parker	Trey Parker	July 28, 1999	309	2.85 1.93 (HH)
41	10	"Korn's Groovy Pirate Ghost Mystery"	Trey Parker	Trey Parker	October 27, 1999	312	3.97 2.50 (HH)
42	11	"Chinpokomon" "Chinpoko Mon"	Eric Stough & Trey Parker	Trey Parker	November 3, 1999	310	3.51 2.36 (HH)
43	12	"Hooked on Monkey Fonics"	Trey Parker	Trey Parker	November 10, 1999	313	3.04 2.05 (HH)
44	13	"Starvin' Marvin in Space"	Trey Parker	Trey Parker, Matt Stone & Kyle McCulloch	November 17, 1999	311	2.99
45	14	"The Red Badge of Gayness" "Red Badge of Gayness"	Trey Parker	Trey Parker	November 24, 1999	314	2.96 1.94 (HH)
46	15	"Mr. Hankey's Christmas Classics"	Trey Parker	Trey Parker	December 1, 1999	315	2.79
47	16	"Are You There God? It's Me, Jesus"	Eric Stough	Trey Parker	December 29, 1999	316	2.13
48	17	"World Wide Recorder Concert" "The Brown Noise"	Eric Stough	Trey Parker	January 12, 2000	317	2.57

=== Season 4 (2000) ===
No. overall	No. in season	Title	Directed by	Written by	Original release date	Prod. code	U.S. viewers (millions)
49	1	"The Tooth Fairy's Tats 2000" "The Tooth Fairy's Tats"	Trey Parker	Trey Parker, Matt Stone & Nancy M. Pimental	April 5, 2000	402	2.38
50	2	"Cartman's Silly Hate Crime 2000" "Cartman's Silly Hate Crime"	Trey Parker & Eric Stough	Trey Parker	April 12, 2000	401	2.62
51	3	"Timmy 2000" "Timmy"	Trey Parker	Trey Parker	April 19, 2000	404	2.88 1.83 (HH) (Note: (HH) denotes that the numbers listed are the number of households the episode was viewed in.)
52	4	"Quintuplets 2000" "Contorting Quintuplets 2000" "Quintuplets"	Trey Parker	Trey Parker	April 26, 2000	403	2.74 1.81 (HH)
53	5	"Cartman Joins NAMBLA"	Eric Stough	Trey Parker	June 21, 2000	406	2.75 1.82 (HH)
54	6	"Cherokee Hair Tampons"	Trey Parker	Trey Parker	June 28, 2000	407	2.84 1.72 (HH)
55	7	"Chef Goes Nanners"	Trey Parker & Eric Stough	Trey Parker	July 5, 2000	408	2.45
56	8	"Something You Can Do with Your Finger"	Trey Parker	Trey Parker	July 12, 2000	409	2.92 1.81 (HH)
57	9	"Do the Handicapped Go to Hell?"	Trey Parker	Trey Parker	July 19, 2000	410	2.24
58	10	"Probably"	Trey Parker	Trey Parker	July 26, 2000	411	3.03 2.01 (HH)
59	11	"Fourth Grade"	Trey Parker	Trey Parker	November 8, 2000	412	3.60
60	12	"Trapper Keeper"	Trey Parker	Trey Parker	November 15, 2000	413	3.27
61	13	"Helen Keller! The Musical"	Trey Parker	Trey Parker	November 22, 2000	414	3.51 (Note: This episode also received 1.6 million viewers with persons aged 18-34.)
62	14	"Pip" "Great Expectations"	Eric Stough	Trey Parker	November 29, 2000	405	2.39
63	15	"Fat Camp"	Trey Parker	Trey Parker	December 6, 2000	415	3.61 (Note: This episode also received 1.93 million viewers with persons aged 25 to 54.) 2.31 (HH)
64	16	"The Wacky Molestation Adventure"	Trey Parker	Trey Parker	December 13, 2000	416	2.87
65	17	"A Very Crappy Christmas"	Adrien Beard	Trey Parker	December 20, 2000	417	3.75 2.30 (HH)

=== Season 5 (2001) ===
No. overall	No. in season	Title	Directed by	Written by	Original release date	Prod. code	U.S. viewers (millions)
66	1	"It Hits the Fan"	Trey Parker	Trey Parker	June 20, 2001	502	3.03 2.10 (Note: The episode was viewed in 2.30 million households in terms of cable household coverage ratings.) (HH)
67	2	"Cripple Fight"	Trey Parker	Trey Parker	June 27, 2001	503	2.74 1.78 (Note: The episode was viewed in 1.82 million households in terms of cable household coverage ratings.) (HH)
68	3	"Super Best Friends"	Trey Parker	Trey Parker	July 4, 2001	504	1.66
69	4	"Scott Tenorman Must Die"	Eric Stough	Trey Parker	July 11, 2001	501	2.81 1.88 (HH)
70	5	"Terrance and Phillip: Behind the Blow"	Trey Parker	Trey Parker	July 18, 2001	505	2.77
71	6	"Cartmanland"	Trey Parker	Trey Parker	July 25, 2001	506	3.09
72	7	"Proper Condom Use"	Trey Parker	Trey Parker	August 1, 2001	507	2.45
73	8	"Towelie"	Trey Parker	Trey Parker	August 8, 2001	508	2.68
74	9	"Osama bin Laden Has Farty Pants"	Trey Parker	Trey Parker	November 7, 2001	509	2.23
75	10	"How to Eat with Your Butt"	Trey Parker	Trey Parker	November 14, 2001	510	3.16
76	11	"The Entity"	Trey Parker	Trey Parker	November 21, 2001	511	2.30
77	12	"Here Comes the Neighborhood"	Eric Stough	Trey Parker	November 28, 2001	512	3.03
78	13	"Kenny Dies"	Trey Parker	Trey Parker	December 5, 2001	513	2.66
79	14	"Butters' Very Own Episode"	Eric Stough	Trey Parker	December 12, 2001	514	2.63

=== Season 6 (2002) ===
No. overall	No. in season	Title	Directed by	Written by	Original release date	Prod. code	Viewers (millions)
80	1	"Jared Has Aides"	Trey Parker	Trey Parker	March 6, 2002	602	3.30
81	2	"Asspen"	Trey Parker	Trey Parker	March 13, 2002	603	2.60
82	3	"Freak Strike"	Trey Parker	Trey Parker	March 20, 2002	601	3.15
83	4	"Fun with Veal"	Trey Parker	Trey Parker	March 27, 2002	605	2.78
84	5	"The New Terrance and Phillip Movie Trailer"	Trey Parker	Trey Parker	April 3, 2002	604	2.78
85	6	"Professor Chaos"	Trey Parker	Trey Parker	April 10, 2002	606	2.43
86	7	"Simpsons Already Did It"	Trey Parker	Trey Parker	June 26, 2002	607	1.94
87	8	"Red Hot Catholic Love"	Trey Parker	Trey Parker	July 3, 2002	608	1.49
88	9	"Free Hat"	Toni Nugnes	Trey Parker	July 10, 2002	609	2.80
89	10	"Bebe's Boobs Destroy Society"	Trey Parker	Trey Parker	July 17, 2002	610	2.53
90	11	"Child Abduction Is Not Funny"	Trey Parker	Trey Parker	July 24, 2002	611	2.01
91	12	"A Ladder to Heaven"	Trey Parker	Trey Parker	November 6, 2002	612	2.65
92	13	"The Return of the Fellowship of the Ring to the Two Towers"	Trey Parker	Trey Parker	November 13, 2002	613	2.80
93	14	"The Death Camp of Tolerance"	Trey Parker	Trey Parker	November 20, 2002	614	2.23
94	15	"The Biggest Douche in the Universe"	Trey Parker	Trey Parker	November 27, 2002	615	1.71
95	16	"My Future Self 'n' Me"	Trey Parker & Eric Stough	Trey Parker	December 4, 2002	616	2.95
96	17	"Red Sleigh Down"	Trey Parker	Trey Parker	December 11, 2002	617	1.98

=== Season 7 (2003) ===
No. overall	No. in season	Title	Directed by	Written by	Original release date	Prod. code	Viewers (millions)
97	1	"Cancelled"	Trey Parker	Trey Parker	March 19, 2003	704	2.34
98	2	"Krazy Kripples"	Trey Parker	Trey Parker	March 26, 2003	702	2.50
99	3	"Toilet Paper"	Trey Parker	Trey Parker	April 2, 2003	703	2.82
100	4	"I'm a Little Bit Country"	Trey Parker	Trey Parker	April 9, 2003	701	3.04
101	5	"Fat Butt and Pancake Head"	Trey Parker	Trey Parker	April 16, 2003	705	2.60
102	6	"Lil' Crime Stoppers"	Trey Parker	Trey Parker	April 23, 2003	706	2.40
103	7	"Red Man's Greed"	Trey Parker	Trey Parker	April 30, 2003	707	2.56
104	8	"South Park Is Gay"	Trey Parker	Trey Parker	October 22, 2003	708	3.10
105	9	"Christian Rock Hard"	Trey Parker	Trey Parker	October 29, 2003	709	2.42
106	10	"Grey Dawn"	Trey Parker	Trey Parker	November 5, 2003	710	2.24
107	11	"Casa Bonita"	Trey Parker	Trey Parker	November 12, 2003	711	2.65
108	12	"All About Mormons"	Trey Parker	Trey Parker	November 19, 2003	712	2.35
109	13	"Butt Out"	Trey Parker	Trey Parker	December 3, 2003	713	2.68
110	14	"Raisins"	Trey Parker	Trey Parker	December 10, 2003	714	2.91
111	15	"It's Christmas in Canada"	Trey Parker	Trey Parker	December 17, 2003	715	2.39

=== Season 8 (2004) ===
No. overall	No. in season	Title	Directed by	Written by	Original release date	Prod. code	U.S. viewers (millions)
112	1	"Good Times with Weapons"	Trey Parker	Trey Parker	March 17, 2004	801	3.31
113	2	"Up the Down Steroid"	Trey Parker	Trey Parker	March 24, 2004	803	3.64
114	3	"The Passion of the Jew"	Trey Parker	Trey Parker	March 31, 2004	804	4.43
115	4	"You Got F'd in the A"	Trey Parker	Trey Parker	April 7, 2004	805	3.96
116	5	"Awesom-O"	Trey Parker	Trey Parker	April 14, 2004	802	3.81
117	6	"The Jeffersons"	Trey Parker	Trey Parker	April 21, 2004	807	4.23
118	7	"Goobacks"	Trey Parker	Trey Parker	April 28, 2004	806	2.79
119	8	"Douche and Turd"	Trey Parker	Trey Parker	October 27, 2004	808	2.91
120	9	"Something Wall-Mart This Way Comes"	Trey Parker	Trey Parker	November 3, 2004	809	3.05
121	10	"Pre-School"	Trey Parker	Trey Parker	November 10, 2004	810	3.26
122	11	"Quest for Ratings"	Trey Parker	Trey Parker	November 17, 2004	811	3.20
123	12	"Stupid Spoiled Whore Video Playset"	Trey Parker	Trey Parker	December 1, 2004	812	3.14
124	13	"Cartman's Incredible Gift"	Trey Parker	Trey Parker	December 8, 2004	813	2.66
125	14	"Woodland Critter Christmas"	Trey Parker	Trey Parker	December 15, 2004	814	2.58

=== Season 9 (2005) ===
No. overall	No. in season	Title	Directed by	Written by	Original release date	Prod. code	Viewers (millions)
126	1	"Mr. Garrison's Fancy New Vagina"	Trey Parker	Trey Parker	March 9, 2005	901	2.97
127	2	"Die Hippie, Die"	Trey Parker	Trey Parker	March 16, 2005	902	2.36
128	3	"Wing"	Trey Parker	Trey Parker	March 23, 2005	903	2.30
129	4	"Best Friends Forever"	Trey Parker	Trey Parker	March 30, 2005	904	2.72
130	5	"The Losing Edge"	Trey Parker	Trey Parker	April 6, 2005	905	2.62
131	6	"The Death of Eric Cartman"	Trey Parker	Trey Parker	April 13, 2005	906	2.61
132	7	"Erection Day"	Trey Parker	Trey Parker	April 20, 2005	907	2.91
133	8	"Two Days Before the Day After Tomorrow"	Trey Parker	Trey Parker	October 19, 2005	908	2.49
134	9	"Marjorine"	Trey Parker	Trey Parker	October 26, 2005	909	2.25
135	10	"Follow That Egg!"	Trey Parker	Trey Parker	November 2, 2005	910	2.87
136	11	"Ginger Kids"	Trey Parker	Trey Parker	November 9, 2005	911	2.59
137	12	"Trapped in the Closet"	Trey Parker	Trey Parker	November 16, 2005	912	2.41
138	13	"Free Willzyx"	Trey Parker	Trey Parker	November 30, 2005	913	2.48
139	14	"Bloody Mary"	Trey Parker	Trey Parker	December 7, 2005	914	2.58

=== Season 10 (2006) ===
No. overall	No. in season	Title	Directed by	Written by	Original release date	Prod. code	Viewers (millions)
140	1	"The Return of Chef"	Trey Parker	Trey Parker	March 22, 2006	1001	3.49
141	2	"Smug Alert!"	Trey Parker	Trey Parker	March 29, 2006	1002	3.38
142	3	"Cartoon Wars Part I"	Trey Parker	Trey Parker	April 5, 2006	1003	3.02
143	4	"Cartoon Wars Part II"	Trey Parker	Trey Parker	April 12, 2006	1004	3.49
144	5	"A Million Little Fibers"	Trey Parker	Trey Parker	April 19, 2006	1005	2.68
145	6	"ManBearPig"	Trey Parker	Trey Parker	April 26, 2006	1006	2.72
146	7	"Tsst"	Trey Parker	Trey Parker	May 3, 2006	1007	2.88
147	8	"Make Love, Not Warcraft"	Trey Parker	Trey Parker	October 4, 2006	1008	3.40
148	9	"Mystery of the Urinal Deuce"	Trey Parker	Trey Parker	October 11, 2006	1009	2.95
149	10	"Miss Teacher Bangs a Boy"	Trey Parker	Trey Parker	October 18, 2006	1010	2.50
150	11	"Hell on Earth 2006"	Trey Parker	Trey Parker	October 25, 2006	1011	2.96
151	12	"Go God Go"	Trey Parker	Trey Parker	November 1, 2006	1012	3.25
152	13	"Go God Go XII"	Trey Parker	Trey Parker	November 8, 2006	1013	3.53
153	14	"Stanley's Cup"	Trey Parker	Trey Parker	November 15, 2006	1014	2.94

=== Season 11 (2007) ===
No. overall	No. in season	Title	Directed by	Written by	Original release date	Prod. code	U.S. viewers (millions)
154	1	"With Apologies to Jesse Jackson"	Trey Parker	Trey Parker	March 7, 2007	1101	2.77
155	2	"Cartman Sucks"	Trey Parker	Trey Parker	March 14, 2007	1102	2.75
156	3	"Lice Capades"	Trey Parker	Trey Parker	March 21, 2007	1103	3.06
157	4	"The Snuke"	Trey Parker	Trey Parker	March 28, 2007	1104	3.17
158	5	"Fantastic Easter Special"	Trey Parker	Trey Parker	April 4, 2007	1105	2.95
159	6	"D-Yikes!"	Trey Parker	Trey Parker	April 11, 2007	1106	2.82
160	7	"Night of the Living Homeless"	Trey Parker	Trey Parker	April 18, 2007	1107	3.11
161	8	"Le Petit Tourette"	Trey Parker	Trey Parker	October 3, 2007	1108	3.32
162	9	"More Crap"	Trey Parker	Trey Parker	October 10, 2007	1109	2.98
163	10	"Imaginationland Episode I"	Trey Parker	Trey Parker	October 17, 2007	1110	3.43
164	11	"Imaginationland Episode II"	Trey Parker	Trey Parker	October 24, 2007	1111	3.60
165	12	"Imaginationland Episode III"	Trey Parker	Trey Parker	October 31, 2007	1112	3.87
166	13	"Guitar Queer-O"	Trey Parker	Trey Parker	November 7, 2007	1113	3.97
167	14	"The List"	Trey Parker	Trey Parker	November 14, 2007	1114	3.77

=== Season 12 (2008) ===
No. overall	No. in season	Title	Directed by	Written by	Original release date	Prod. code	U.S. viewers (millions)
168	1	"Tonsil Trouble"	Trey Parker	Trey Parker	March 12, 2008	1201	3.07
169	2	"Britney's New Look"	Trey Parker	Trey Parker	March 19, 2008	1202	2.97
170	3	"Major Boobage"	Trey Parker	Trey Parker	March 26, 2008	1203	3.60
171	4	"Canada on Strike"	Trey Parker	Trey Parker	April 2, 2008	1204	2.80
172	5	"Eek, a Penis!"	Trey Parker	Trey Parker	April 9, 2008	1205	3.50
173	6	"Over Logging"	Trey Parker	Trey Parker	April 16, 2008	1206	3.13
174	7	"Super Fun Time"	Trey Parker	Trey Parker	April 23, 2008	1207	3.08
175	8	"The China Probrem"	Trey Parker	Trey Parker	October 8, 2008	1208	3.73
176	9	"Breast Cancer Show Ever"	Trey Parker	Trey Parker	October 15, 2008	1209	2.85
177	10	"Pandemic"	Trey Parker	Trey Parker	October 22, 2008	1210	2.78
178	11	"Pandemic 2: The Startling"	Trey Parker	Trey Parker	October 29, 2008	1211	3.08
179	12	"About Last Night..."	Trey Parker	Trey Parker	November 5, 2008	1212	3.60
180	13	"Elementary School Musical"	Trey Parker	Trey Parker	November 12, 2008	1213	2.96
181	14	"The Ungroundable"	Trey Parker	Trey Parker	November 19, 2008	1214	3.29

=== Season 13 (2009) ===
No. overall	No. in season	Title	Directed by	Written by	Original release date	Prod. code	U.S. viewers (millions)
182	1	"The Ring"	Trey Parker	Trey Parker	March 11, 2009	1301	3.41
183	2	"The Coon"	Trey Parker	Trey Parker	March 18, 2009	1302	3.27
184	3	"Margaritaville"	Trey Parker	Trey Parker	March 25, 2009	1303	2.77
185	4	"Eat, Pray, Queef"	Trey Parker	Trey Parker	April 1, 2009	1304	3.01
186	5	"Fishsticks"	Trey Parker	Trey Parker	April 8, 2009	1305	3.11
187	6	"Pinewood Derby"	Trey Parker	Trey Parker	April 15, 2009	1306	2.78
188	7	"Fatbeard"	Trey Parker	Trey Parker	April 22, 2009	1307	2.59
189	8	"Dead Celebrities"	Trey Parker	Trey Parker	October 7, 2009	1308	2.67
190	9	"Butters' Bottom Bitch"	Trey Parker	Trey Parker	October 14, 2009	1309	2.56
191	10	"W.T.F."	Trey Parker	Trey Parker	October 21, 2009	1310	2.58
192	11	"Whale Whores"	Trey Parker	Trey Parker	October 28, 2009	1311	2.57
193	12	"The F Word"	Trey Parker	Trey Parker	November 4, 2009	1312	2.82
194	13	"Dances with Smurfs"	Trey Parker	Trey Parker	November 11, 2009	1313	2.77
195	14	"Pee"	Trey Parker	Trey Parker	November 18, 2009	1314	2.87

=== Season 14 (2010) ===
No. overall	No. in season	Title	Directed by	Written by	Original release date	Prod. code	U.S. viewers (millions)
196	1	"Sexual Healing"	Trey Parker	Trey Parker	March 17, 2010	1401	3.74
197	2	"The Tale of Scrotie McBoogerballs"	Trey Parker	Trey Parker	March 24, 2010	1402	3.24
198	3	"Medicinal Fried Chicken"	Trey Parker	Trey Parker	March 31, 2010	1403	2.99
199	4	"You Have 0 Friends"	Trey Parker	Trey Parker	April 7, 2010	1404	3.07
200	5	"200"	Trey Parker	Trey Parker	April 14, 2010	1405	3.33
201	6	"201"	Trey Parker	Trey Parker	April 21, 2010	1406	3.50
202	7	"Crippled Summer"	Trey Parker	Trey Parker	April 28, 2010	1407	3.55
203	8	"Poor and Stupid"	Trey Parker	Trey Parker	October 6, 2010	1408	3.14
204	9	"It's a Jersey Thing"	Trey Parker	Trey Parker	October 13, 2010	1409	3.25
205	10	"Insheeption"	Trey Parker	Trey Parker	October 20, 2010	1410	2.89
206	11	"Coon 2: Hindsight"	Trey Parker	Trey Parker	October 27, 2010	1411	2.76
207	12	"Mysterion Rises"	Trey Parker	Trey Parker	November 3, 2010	1412	2.85
208	13	"Coon vs. Coon and Friends"	Trey Parker	Trey Parker	November 10, 2010	1413	2.79
209	14	"Crème Fraîche"	Trey Parker	Trey Parker	November 17, 2010	1414	2.49

=== Season 15 (2011) ===
No. overall	No. in season	Title	Directed by	Written by	Original release date	Prod. code	U.S. viewers (millions)
210	1	"HumancentiPad"	Trey Parker	Trey Parker	April 27, 2011	1501	3.11
211	2	"Funnybot"	Trey Parker	Trey Parker	May 4, 2011	1502	2.59
212	3	"Royal Pudding"	Trey Parker	Trey Parker	May 11, 2011	1503	2.43
213	4	"T.M.I."	Trey Parker	Trey Parker	May 18, 2011	1504	2.42
214	5	"Crack Baby Athletic Association"	Trey Parker	Trey Parker	May 25, 2011	1505	2.53
215	6	"City Sushi"	Trey Parker	Trey Parker	June 1, 2011	1506	2.56
216	7	"You're Getting Old"	Trey Parker	Trey Parker	June 8, 2011	1507	2.30
217	8	"Ass Burgers"	Trey Parker	Trey Parker	October 5, 2011	1508	2.94
218	9	"The Last of the Meheecans"	Trey Parker	Trey Parker	October 12, 2011	1509	2.90
219	10	"Bass to Mouth"	Trey Parker	Trey Parker	October 19, 2011	1510	2.43
220	11	"Broadway Bro Down"	Trey Parker	Trey Parker & Robert Lopez (uncredited)	October 26, 2011	1511	2.92
221	12	"1%"	Trey Parker	Trey Parker	November 2, 2011	1512	2.85
222	13	"A History Channel Thanksgiving"	Trey Parker	Trey Parker	November 9, 2011	1513	2.85
223	14	"The Poor Kid"	Trey Parker	Trey Parker	November 16, 2011	1514	2.41

=== Season 16 (2012) ===
No. overall	No. in season	Title	Directed by	Written by	Original release date	Prod. code	U.S. viewers (millions)
224	1	"Reverse Cowgirl"	Trey Parker	Trey Parker	March 14, 2012	1601	2.63
225	2	"Cash for Gold"	Trey Parker	Trey Parker	March 21, 2012	1602	2.31
226	3	"Faith Hilling"	Trey Parker	Trey Parker	March 28, 2012	1603	2.70
227	4	"Jewpacabra"	Trey Parker	Trey Parker	April 4, 2012	1604	2.69
228	5	"Butterballs"	Trey Parker	Trey Parker	April 11, 2012	1605	2.23
229	6	"I Should Have Never Gone Ziplining"	Trey Parker	Trey Parker	April 18, 2012	1606	2.43
230	7	"Cartman Finds Love"	Trey Parker	Trey Parker	April 25, 2012	1607	2.33
231	8	"Sarcastaball"	Trey Parker	Trey Parker	September 26, 2012	1608	1.84
232	9	"Raising the Bar"	Trey Parker	Trey Parker	October 3, 2012	1609	1.69
233	10	"Insecurity"	Trey Parker	Trey Parker	October 10, 2012	1610	2.33
234	11	"Going Native"	Trey Parker	Trey Parker	October 17, 2012	1611	1.98
235	12	"A Nightmare on FaceTime"	Trey Parker	Trey Parker	October 24, 2012	1612	1.89
236	13	"A Scause for Applause"	Trey Parker	Trey Parker	October 31, 2012	1613	1.96
237	14	"Obama Wins!"	Trey Parker	Trey Parker	November 7, 2012	1614	2.19

=== Season 17 (2013) ===
No. overall	No. in season	Title	Directed by	Written by	Original release date	Prod. code	U.S. viewers (millions)
238	1	"Let Go, Let Gov"	Trey Parker	Trey Parker	September 25, 2013	1701	2.89
239	2	"Informative Murder Porn"	Trey Parker	Trey Parker	October 2, 2013	1702	2.49
240	3	"World War Zimmerman"	Trey Parker	Trey Parker	October 9, 2013	1703	2.06
241	4	"Goth Kids 3: Dawn of the Posers"	Trey Parker	Trey Parker	October 23, 2013	1704	1.83
242	5	"Taming Strange"	Trey Parker	Trey Parker	October 30, 2013	1705	1.89
243	6	"Ginger Cow"	Trey Parker	Trey Parker	November 6, 2013	1706	2.39
244	7	"Black Friday"	Trey Parker	Trey Parker	November 13, 2013	1707	2.07
245	8	"A Song of Ass and Fire"	Trey Parker	Trey Parker	November 20, 2013	1708	2.39
246	9	"Titties and Dragons"	Trey Parker	Trey Parker	December 4, 2013	1709	2.48
247	10	"The Hobbit"	Trey Parker	Trey Parker	December 11, 2013	1710	2.17

=== Season 18 (2014) ===
No. overall	No. in season	Title	Directed by	Written by	Original release date	Prod. code	U.S. viewers (millions)
248	1	"Go Fund Yourself"	Trey Parker	Trey Parker	September 17, 2014	1801	2.40
249	2	"Gluten Free Ebola"	Trey Parker	Trey Parker	September 24, 2014	1802	2.24
250	3	"The Cissy"	Trey Parker	Trey Parker	October 1, 2014	1803	2.02
251	4	"Handicar"	Trey Parker	Trey Parker	October 15, 2014	1804	1.73
252	5	"The Magic Bush"	Trey Parker	Trey Parker	October 22, 2014	1805	1.73
253	6	"Freemium Isn't Free"	Trey Parker	Trey Parker	October 29, 2014	1806	1.70
254	7	"Grounded Vindaloop"	Trey Parker	Trey Parker	November 12, 2014	1807	1.66
255	8	"Cock Magic"	Trey Parker	Trey Parker	November 19, 2014	1808	1.69
256	9	"#REHASH"	Trey Parker	Trey Parker	December 3, 2014	1809	2.10
257	10	"#HappyHolograms"	Trey Parker	Trey Parker	December 10, 2014	1810	1.66

=== Season 19 (2015) ===
No. overall	No. in season	Title	Directed by	Written by	Original release date	Prod. code	U.S. viewers (millions)
258	1	"Stunning and Brave"	Trey Parker	Trey Parker	September 16, 2015	1901	1.76
259	2	"Where My Country Gone?"	Trey Parker	Trey Parker	September 23, 2015	1902	1.49
260	3	"The City Part of Town"	Trey Parker	Trey Parker	September 30, 2015	1903	1.32
261	4	"You're Not Yelping"	Trey Parker	Trey Parker	October 14, 2015	1904	1.37
262	5	"Safe Space"	Trey Parker	Trey Parker	October 21, 2015	1905	1.21
263	6	"Tweek x Craig"	Trey Parker	Trey Parker	October 28, 2015	1906	1.34
264	7	"Naughty Ninjas"	Trey Parker	Trey Parker	November 11, 2015	1907	1.42
265	8	"Sponsored Content"	Trey Parker	Trey Parker	November 18, 2015	1908	1.30
266	9	"Truth and Advertising"	Trey Parker	Trey Parker	December 2, 2015	1909	1.43
267	10	"PC Principal Final Justice"	Trey Parker	Trey Parker	December 9, 2015	1910	1.83

=== Season 20 (2016) ===
No. overall	No. in season	Title	Directed by	Written by	Original release date	Prod. code	U.S. viewers (millions)
268	1	"Member Berries"	Trey Parker	Trey Parker	September 14, 2016	2001	2.17
269	2	"Skank Hunt"	Trey Parker	Trey Parker	September 21, 2016	2002	1.58
270	3	"The Damned"	Trey Parker	Trey Parker	September 28, 2016	2003	1.79
271	4	"Wieners Out"	Trey Parker	Trey Parker	October 12, 2016	2004	1.82
272	5	"Douche and a Danish"	Trey Parker	Trey Parker	October 19, 2016	2005	1.32
273	6	"Fort Collins"	Trey Parker	Trey Parker	October 26, 2016	2006	1.41
274	7	"Oh, Jeez"	Trey Parker	Trey Parker	November 9, 2016	2007	2.03
275	8	"Members Only"	Trey Parker	Trey Parker	November 16, 2016	2008	1.79
276	9	"Not Funny"	Trey Parker	Trey Parker	November 30, 2016	2009	1.45
277	10	"The End of Serialization as We Know It"	Trey Parker	Trey Parker	December 7, 2016	2010	1.82

=== Season 21 (2017) ===
No. overall	No. in season	Title	Directed by	Written by	Original release date	Prod. code	U.S. viewers (millions)
278	1	"White People Renovating Houses"	Trey Parker	Trey Parker	September 13, 2017	2101	1.68
279	2	"Put It Down"	Trey Parker	Trey Parker	September 20, 2017	2102	1.25
280	3	"Holiday Special"	Trey Parker	Trey Parker	September 27, 2017	2103	1.25
281	4	"Franchise Prequel"	Trey Parker	Trey Parker	October 11, 2017	2104	1.12
282	5	"Hummels & Heroin"	Trey Parker	Trey Parker	October 18, 2017	2105	0.93
283	6	"Sons a Witches"	Trey Parker	Trey Parker	October 25, 2017	2106	1.22
284	7	"Doubling Down"	Trey Parker	Trey Parker	November 8, 2017	2107	1.13
285	8	"Moss Piglets"	Trey Parker	Trey Parker	November 15, 2017	2108	1.09
286	9	"Super Hard PCness"	Trey Parker	Trey Parker	November 29, 2017	2109	0.90
287	10	"Splatty Tomato"	Trey Parker	Trey Parker	December 6, 2017	2110	0.97

=== Season 22 (2018) ===
No. overall	No. in season	Title	Directed by	Written by	Original release date	Prod. code	U.S. viewers (millions)
288	1	"Dead Kids"	Trey Parker	Trey Parker	September 26, 2018	2201	1.09
289	2	"A Boy and a Priest"	Trey Parker	Trey Parker	October 3, 2018	2202	0.93
290	3	"The Problem with a Poo"	Trey Parker	Trey Parker	October 10, 2018	2203	0.97
291	4	"Tegridy Farms"	Trey Parker	Trey Parker	October 17, 2018	2204	0.71
292	5	"The Scoots"	Trey Parker	Trey Parker	October 31, 2018	2205	0.84
293	6	"Time to Get Cereal"	Trey Parker	Trey Parker	November 7, 2018	2206	0.83
294	7	"Nobody Got Cereal?"	Trey Parker	Trey Parker	November 14, 2018	2207	0.82
295	8	"Buddha Box"	Trey Parker	Trey Parker	November 28, 2018	2208	0.83
296	9	"Unfulfilled"	Trey Parker	Trey Parker	December 5, 2018	2209	0.77
297	10	"Bike Parade"	Trey Parker	Trey Parker	December 12, 2018	2210	0.83

=== Season 23 (2019) ===
No. overall	No. in season	Title	Directed by	Written by	Original release date	Prod. code	U.S. viewers (millions)
298	1	"Mexican Joker"	Trey Parker	Trey Parker	September 25, 2019	2301	0.92
299	2	"Band in China"	Trey Parker	Trey Parker	October 2, 2019	2302	0.73
300	3	"Shots!!!"	Trey Parker	Trey Parker	October 9, 2019	2303	0.95
301	4	"Let Them Eat Goo"	Trey Parker	Trey Parker	October 16, 2019	2304	0.77
302	5	"Tegridy Farms Halloween Special"	Trey Parker	Trey Parker	October 30, 2019	2305	0.84
303	6	"Season Finale"	Trey Parker	Trey Parker	November 6, 2019	2306	0.84
304	7	"Board Girls"	Trey Parker	Trey Parker	November 13, 2019	2307	0.85
305	8	"Turd Burglars"	Trey Parker	Trey Parker	November 27, 2019	2308	0.66
306	9	"Basic Cable"	Trey Parker	Trey Parker	December 4, 2019	2309	0.80
307	10	"Christmas Snow"	Trey Parker	Trey Parker	December 11, 2019	2310	0.81

=== Season 24 (2020–2021) ===
South Park, season 24 episodes
No. overall	No. in season	Title	Directed by	Written by	Original release date	Prod. code	U.S. viewers (millions)
308	1	"The Pandemic Special"	Trey Parker	Trey Parker	September 30, 2020	2401	2.27
309	2	"South ParQ Vaccination Special"	Trey Parker	Trey Parker	March 10, 2021	2402	1.74

=== Specials (2021) ===
South Park, specials
No. overall	Title	Directed by	Written by	Original release date
310	"South Park: Post COVID"	Trey Parker	Trey Parker	November 25, 2021
311	"South Park: Post COVID: The Return of COVID"	Trey Parker	Trey Parker	December 16, 2021

=== Season 25 (2022) ===
No. overall	No. in season	Title	Directed by	Written by	Original release date	Prod. code	U.S. viewers (millions)
312	1	"Pajama Day"	Trey Parker	Trey Parker	February 2, 2022	2501	0.84 (Note: The first episode was simulcast on numerous Paramount channels, earning additional first-run views beyond the amount cited here.)
313	2	"The Big Fix"	Trey Parker	Trey Parker	February 9, 2022	2502	0.66
314	3	"City People"	Trey Parker	Trey Parker	February 16, 2022	2503	0.66
315	4	"Back to the Cold War"	Trey Parker	Trey Parker	March 2, 2022	2504	0.53
316	5	"Help, My Teenager Hates Me!"	Trey Parker	Trey Parker	March 9, 2022	2505	0.62
317	6	"Credigree Weed St. Patrick's Day Special"	Trey Parker	Trey Parker	March 16, 2022	2506	0.49

=== Specials (2022) ===
South Park, specials
No. overall	Title	Directed by	Written by	Original release date
318	"South Park: The Streaming Wars"	Trey Parker	Trey Parker	June 1, 2022
319	"South Park: The Streaming Wars Part 2"	Trey Parker	Trey Parker	July 13, 2022

=== Season 26 (2023) ===
No. overall	No. in season	Title	Directed by	Written by	Original release date	Prod. code	U.S. viewers (millions)
320	1	"Cupid Ye"	Matt Stone	Matt Stone	February 8, 2023	2601	0.48
321	2	"The Worldwide Privacy Tour"	Trey Parker	Trey Parker	February 15, 2023	2602	0.56
322	3	"Japanese Toilet"	Trey Parker	Trey Parker	March 1, 2023	2603	0.48
323	4	"Deep Learning"	Trey Parker	Trey Parker & ChatGPT	March 8, 2023	2604	0.47
324	5	"DikinBaus Hot Dogs"	Trey Parker	Trey Parker	March 22, 2023	2605	0.43
325	6	"Spring Break"	Trey Parker	Trey Parker	March 29, 2023	2606	0.47

=== Specials (2023–2024) ===
South Park, specials
No. overall	Title	Directed by	Written by	Original release date
326	"South Park: Joining the Panderverse"	Trey Parker	Trey Parker	October 27, 2023
327	"South Park (Not Suitable for Children)"	Trey Parker	Trey Parker	December 20, 2023
328	"South Park: The End of Obesity"	Trey Parker	Trey Parker	May 24, 2024

=== Season 27 (2025) ===
No. overall	No. in season	Title	Directed by	Written by	Original release date	Prod. code	U.S. viewers (millions)
329	1	"Sermon on the 'Mount"	Trey Parker	Trey Parker	July 23, 2025	2701	0.43
330	2	"Got a Nut"	Trey Parker	Trey Parker	August 6, 2025	2702	0.84
331	3	"Sickofancy"	Trey Parker	Trey Parker	August 20, 2025	2703	0.85
332	4	"Wok Is Dead"	Trey Parker	Trey Parker	September 3, 2025	2704	0.67
333	5	"Conflict of Interest"	Trey Parker	Trey Parker	September 24, 2025	2705	0.55

=== Season 28 (2025) ===
No. overall	No. in season	Title	Directed by	Written by	Original release date	Prod. code	U.S. viewers (millions)
334	1	"Twisted Christian"	Trey Parker	Trey Parker	October 15, 2025	2801	0.52
335	2	"The Woman in the Hat"	Trey Parker	Trey Parker	October 31, 2025	2802	0.31
336	3	"Sora Not Sorry"	Trey Parker	Trey Parker	November 12, 2025	2803	0.53
337	4	"Turkey Trot"	Trey Parker	Trey Parker	November 26, 2025	2804	0.37
338	5	"The Crap Out"	Trey Parker	Trey Parker	December 10, 2025	2805	0.46

=== Season 29 (2026) ===
No. overall	No. in season	Title	Directed by	Written by	Original release date	Prod. code	U.S. viewers (millions)
339	1	"South American Biker Gangs"	Trey Parker	Trey Parker	September 16, 2026	2901	N/A
340	2	"Billionaire Weenietown"	Trey Parker	Trey Parker	September 30, 2026	2902	N/A
341	3	"You Like That on Your Face"	Trey Parker	Trey Parker	October 14, 2026	2903	N/A
342	4	"Guinea Pig on a Stick"	Trey Parker	Trey Parker	October 28, 2026	2904	TBD
343	5	"We Be Clubbin'"	Trey Parker	Trey Parker	November 11, 2026	2905	TBD

== See also ==
- List of South Park home video releases
