= South Park season 25 =

Season of television series

South Park
- Season 25
- Home media release cover
- No. of episodes: 6

Release
- Original network: Comedy Central
- Original release: February 2 – March 16, 2022

Season chronology
- ← Previous; Season 24 Next → Season 26

The twenty-fifth season of the American animated sitcom series South Park premiered on Comedy Central on February 2, 2022 and ended on March 16, 2022.

== Marketing ==
To celebrate the show's 25th anniversary, live Broadway orchestral covers of the series' songs were performed, alongside the release date of the upcoming season.

On March 16, 2022, a live concert celebrating 25 years of South Park music was announced, which took place at the Red Rocks Amphitheatre in Morrison, Colorado, on August 10, 2022. On June 7, 2022, a second concert was announced and took place on August 9, 2022. The concerts featured appearances by Trey Parker and Matt Stone and music by Primus and Ween. The concert aired as a special on August 13 on Comedy Central, which is the anniversary date of the show's premiere, and became available the next day on Paramount+. An exhibition, titled South Park: The 25th Anniversary Experience, and various pop-up stores were set up at select locations in the United States and other countries.

== Episodes ==
No. overall	No. in season	Title	Directed by	Written by	Original release date	Prod. code	U.S. viewers (millions)
312	1	"Pajama Day"	Trey Parker	Trey Parker	February 2, 2022	2501	0.84 (Note: The first episode was simulcast on numerous Paramount channels, earning additional first-run views beyond the amount cited here.)
After failing to show respect for their teacher, PC Principal revokes Pajama Day privileges for the entire fourth grade class as punishment. Cartman is distraught. The kids are not going to stand for it but PC Principal refuses to back down.
313	2	"The Big Fix"	Trey Parker	Trey Parker	February 9, 2022	2502	0.66
When Randy invites the Black family to Tegridy Farms, Stan is amazed to learn a new truth about one of his friends.
314	3	"City People"	Trey Parker	Trey Parker	February 16, 2022	2503	0.66
When Cartman's mom gets a job as a real estate agent, Cartman forms his own real estate business.
315	4	"Back to the Cold War"	Trey Parker	Trey Parker	March 2, 2022	2504	0.53
After the 2022 Russian invasion of Ukraine, Mr. Mackey prepares for a nuclear war, while Butters is preparing for a dressage competition.
316	5	"Help, My Teenager Hates Me!"	Trey Parker	Trey Parker	March 9, 2022	2505	0.62
The boys begin playing Airsoft and start spending time with teenagers who cause them problems.
317	6	"Credigree Weed St. Patrick's Day Special"	Trey Parker	Trey Parker	March 16, 2022	2506	0.49
While Butters is excited to celebrate St. Patrick's Day, Randy gets into trouble with Steve Black. Butters is shocked that most people in South Park do not know what St. Patrick's Day is all about.

== Reception ==
Screen Rant felt that the season was too short, saying that "it took quite a while for South Park season 25 to get going. Some of the earlier episodes, such as 'Pajama Day', felt like they were going through the motions with their COVID-related satire, and by the time the season did get going with a pair of Butters-centric episodes touching upon cancel culture and the Russian invasion of Ukraine, the season was already over. Without more episodes to properly develop and marinate character-specific plot threads and the brilliant current events satire that came with them, South Park's latest season, unfortunately, did not tell a complete and satisfying story."

== Home media ==
The season was released on Blu-ray and DVD on April 4, 2023.

== See also ==
- South Park (Park County, Colorado)
- South Park City
