= South Park season 21 =

Season of television series

South Park
- Season 21
- Home media release cover
- No. of episodes: 10

Release
- Original network: Comedy Central
- Original release: September 13 – December 6, 2017

Season chronology
- ← Previous; Season 20 Next → Season 22

The twenty-first season of the American animated sitcom South Park premiered on Comedy Central on September 13, 2017, and contains ten episodes. This season had planned "dark weeks" (weeks during which no new episodes would air) after episode three, episode six, and episode eight. The season lampooned many events and cultural institutions such as the Trump administration, the Unite the Right rally in Charlottesville, Netflix, the Marvel Cinematic Universe, and themes of self-victimization. The season received mixed to positive reviews, with many reviewers praising the show's ability to remain relevant and choice of abandoning the linear narrative that dominated much of the previous season, despite many of the previous story threads being carried over into this season such as Cartman's relationship with Heidi. The seasons ratings declined overall in comparison to the previous season. The second episode "Put It Down" received an Emmy nomination.

== Marketing ==
Comedy Central announced on August 22 that the network would be running a marathon of South Park consisting of 254 episodes, all airing over eight days, in a similar vein to The Simpsons 600 episode marathon that aired over 13 days of the previous year. The marathon drew more than 10 million unique viewers to the network. Online across Instagram, Facebook, and Twitter over 7 million video views were generated as well as 500,000 engagements. The stunt helped increase the ratings of other Comedy Central programs as well such as Broad City, which premiered directly after South Park.

== Episodes ==
No. overall	No. in season	Title	Directed by	Written by	Original release date	Prod. code	U.S. viewers (millions)
278	1	"White People Renovating Houses"	Trey Parker	Trey Parker	September 13, 2017	2101	1.68
Randy and Sharon start a home renovation show that is threatened. Cartman's relationship with Heidi becomes strained and he grows attached to his Amazon Alexa.
279	2	"Put It Down"	Trey Parker	Trey Parker	September 20, 2017	2102	1.25
Tweek and Craig's relationship is strained. Cartman begs Heidi to take him back but claims suicidal thoughts. Everyone else is busy mourning people killed by distracted drivers.
280	3	"Holiday Special"	Trey Parker	Trey Parker	September 27, 2017	2103	1.25
A relationship is formed when Randy kisses a Native American man.
281	4	"Franchise Prequel"	Trey Parker	Trey Parker	October 11, 2017	2104	1.12
The Coon and Friends members struggle to start a superhero franchise while fake news gets spread about them through Facebook. Mark Zuckerberg visits South Park, invading everyone's privacy and speaking like a 1970s voiced-over kung fu villain.
282	5	"Hummels & Heroin"	Trey Parker	Trey Parker	October 18, 2017	2105	0.93
Opioids cause a problem in South Park and Stan is believed to be responsible.
283	6	"Sons a Witches"	Trey Parker	Trey Parker	October 25, 2017	2106	1.22
When a witch causes problems for South Park's Halloween, Cartman looks for a way to use this crisis to kill his girlfriend whom he finds annoying.
284	7	"Doubling Down"	Trey Parker	Trey Parker	November 8, 2017	2107	1.13
Kyle is fed up with Cartman's abuse towards Heidi and gets involved. President Garrison's advisers worry about some of his recent actions.
285	8	"Moss Piglets"	Trey Parker	Trey Parker	November 15, 2017	2108	1.09
Timmy and Jimmy's science project catches the attention of some very important people. As Heidi and Cartman's codependent relationship continues, she takes on his appearance and behavior, earning the disapproval of her peers.
286	9	"Super Hard PCness"	Trey Parker	Trey Parker	November 29, 2017	2109	0.90
PC Principal falls in love with the new vice-principal. Kyle realizes how wrong Terrance and Philip are.
287	10	"Splatty Tomato"	Trey Parker	Trey Parker	December 6, 2017	2110	0.97
The President, Mr. Garrison, continues to cause problems for the children of South Park.

== Reception ==
The twenty-first season of South Park received mixed reviews. On Rotten Tomatoes, the season holds a 54% approval rating based on 13 reviews, stating "South Park delivers an uncharacteristically stilted season that feels timid in its satire and unsure of who or what it's lampooning."

Jesse Schedeen with IGN rated the entire season an 8.2 out of 10, praising the creators Trey Parker and Matt Stone for shifting away from continuity-heavy storylines and commentary on current events and returning to its roots in absurdity-based situational humor. Schedeen commented, "It's not that this season ignored what was going on in the world this year, but it wasn't quite so obsessed with lampooning current events from week to week. That shift, more than anything else, resulted in a stronger, more well-rounded show."

== Home media ==
This season was released in its entirety on DVD and Blu-ray on June 5, 2018.

== See also ==
- South Park (Park County, Colorado)
- South Park City
