= Credigree Weed St. Patrick's Day Special =

- South Park episode
- Episode no.: Season 25; Episode 6
- Directed by: Trey Parker
- Written by: Trey Parker
- Production code: 2506
- Original air date: March 16, 2022

Episode chronology
← Previous "Help, My Teenager Hates Me!"	Next → "South Park: The Streaming Wars"
- South Park season 25

"Credigree Weed St. Patrick's Day Special" is the sixth episode and the season finale of the twenty-fifth season of the American animated television series South Park. The 317th episode overall of the series, it premiered on Comedy Central in the United States on March 16, 2022.

== Plot ==
Randy Marsh prepares to release a new blend of Tegridy Farms marijuana for Saint Patrick's Day, but becomes frustrated when he sees that neighboring farm Credigree Weed, owned by Steve Black, is also selling a St. Patrick's Day Special. Meanwhile, Butters Stotch arrives at South Park Elementary in a jovial mood, and pinches a fellow student who is not wearing green, but it was later revealed that the student was actually wearing green socks. Because she did not consent to this pinching, Butters is arrested and thrown in jail for sexual assault. Back at Credigree Weed, Randy and Steve fight after the former accuses the latter of culturally appropriating Irish and white culture. Randy is thrown into jail with Butters, who interprets his arrival as a sign of hope from Saint Patrick himself.

Steve receives an order from the owner of the Irish bar Farty O'Cools for two-and-a-half tons of Credigree Weed. His wife Linda wonders how he will procure such a large amount, but Steve remains optimistic nonetheless. Randy uses his phone call to convince his son Stan to ditch school and smuggle some Tegridy Weed into jail. He and his friends hide the cannabis in a cake, and Randy is about to offer some to a nearby guard when a shipment of free Credigree Weed arrives at the police station. Enraged by this, Randy uses magical leprechaun powers to break out of prison with Butters.

He arrives at his cannabis farm only to find that his business partner Towelie had sold the Tegridy Farms St. Patrick's Day Special to Steve at half-price. Randy beats Towelie up and travels to Farty O'Cools to confront Steve, where patrons are on high alert after the news announces that a sexual predator (Butters) has escaped his cell. The police chase Butters down, and as he is about to surrender, the real Saint Patrick descends upon South Park and delivers a disillusioned speech about how the original message of St. Patrick's Day—getting drunk and performing sexual acts—has been lost. Saint Patrick sexually assaults various women and men during this speech, causing the townsfolk to lose interest in him and the holiday altogether.

The episode ends with the news that St. Patrick's Day, the final holiday where white people can fully celebrate their race, has been cancelled; it is also revealed that Butters has been sentenced to five years of community service.

== Reception ==
Dan Caffrey of The A.V. Club gave the episode an "A-," claiming that although nobody at the end of the episode "seems ready to wax philosophical on the pitfalls and complexities of cultural appropriation," such an unresolved ending is still "successful here because, to put it crassly, the jokes just work. It will always be funny to see the wholesome Butters thrown into unbearably gritty situations like getting arrested for sexual assault. It will always be funny to see Randy deal with his latest perceived injustice. It will always be funny to see another debauched villain portrayed as a lo-fi cardboard cutout [similar to] Saddam Hussein and Mel Gibson."

Max Nocerino of Future of the Force gave the episode "a solid A," while the website awarded it five out of five stars. He called the episode's main message of cultural appropriation "absurdist-surreal South Park at its finest," as well as praising the secondary message satirizing "the misogynistic culture of inappropriately touching women due to the lure of revealing and skimpy outfits."
