= Doubling Down (South Park) =

- South Park episode
- Episode no.: Season 21; Episode 7
- Directed by: Trey Parker
- Written by: Trey Parker
- Production code: 2107
- Original air date: November 8, 2017

Episode chronology
← Previous "Sons a Witches"	Next → "Moss Piglets"
- South Park season 21

"Doubling Down" is the seventh episode in the twenty-first season of the American animated television series South Park. The 284th overall episode of the series, it first aired on Comedy Central in the United States on November 8, 2017. This episode parodied the decreasing popularity of the Donald Trump administration by loosely comparing it to suffering from Stockholm syndrome.

== Plot ==
Eric Cartman's abusive treatment of Heidi Turner is straining their relationship. He blames his anger issues on his poor diet, so Heidi convinces Cartman to try a vegan diet with her in an attempt to reconcile. The next day at lunch, Cartman continues to degrade Heidi to the rest of the boys, but treats her kindly when she shows up. When Kyle Broflovski talks to Heidi after school about her relationship with Cartman, she gets defensive and avoids the subject. At Heidi's home, Cartman states that he now enjoys Beyond Meat and presents her with a bucket of KFC to try, claiming that it is actually "Beyond KFC" and vegan. Back at school, she feels bloated and ill, while Cartman insults her behind her back and tells the boys that she is getting fat. Kyle goes to a girls' volleyball practice to ask them to stop mocking Heidi, and they question if Kyle is doing so because he has feelings for Heidi himself. He decides to back off his attempts to break up Cartman and Heidi, but later talks to Heidi in the school gymnasium. The two bond as Kyle tells Heidi that Cartman is an expert at playing the victim and will never change.

Cartman goes to Tolkien Black's house claiming that he and Heidi have broken up again and asks to move in with Token and participate in any acts of disrespecting the American flag or other forms of social protesting that their family may do. While there, Token's parents reveal to Cartman that Heidi has been seen holding hands with Kyle. Cartman has a brief vision of Kyle dancing around with imagery and music that evokes the song "Pink Elephants on Parade" from Dumbo. The girls take Heidi out to dinner to celebrate while also belittling her for ever having a relationship with Cartman, which makes Heidi question her feelings. Heidi visits Cartman to apologize and complete their break-up, but Cartman decides to tell her more information. Soon afterwards, Heidi blames Kyle for manipulating her and breaks up with him, returning to Cartman again.

Meanwhile, at the White House, President Garrison is warned by Mitch McConnell, Paul Ryan, and Mike Pence of the general discord against him and his administration as he is keeping on his campaign promise to "fuck them all to death". Garrison then locks the trio in his office after they threaten to stand up against him. When Ryan is questioned by reporters about his support of Garrison, he is shown with a semen-stained black eye and only voices support for Garrison out of fear. Ryan finds a poll which shows Garrison's approval ratings to be very low, and he and the others plan to use it against Garrison, but Garrison finds them and states he knows how to handle societal psychology. When they bring Garrison a cake to celebrate his one-year anniversary of becoming president, Garrison promises that the next three years will be even better, as he walks out from behind his desk wearing a large strap-on dildo.

== Critical reception ==
Dani Di Placido of Forbes loved the episode, stating in his review that it was "the best episode of the season, and perhaps the best the show has been in years" and that "This episode, and the brilliant 'Put It Down' have shown that Matt and Trey have learned how to use their 'Trump card.' Garrison-Trump is a lethal weapon, to be used sparingly, for when they actually have something worth saying. Compared to the ocean of white noise out there, it's admirably restrained, and South Park's satire is all the sharper for it."

Dan Caffrey of The A.V. Club gave the episode an A− rating, and summarized in his review "'Doubling Down' simply recognizes that this past election was complicated. It recognizes that Trump voters, like anyone else, are complicated. Should their opposers embrace them or should they never bother reaching out in the first place? In Parker and Stone's eyes, that's something that can't be answered by a mere cartoon."

Jesse Schedeen of IGN rated the episode a 6.3 out of 10, stating that "Unfortunately, the emphasis on pointless Oval Office humor weighed down this episode pretty severely. It's just more evidence that South Park needs to keep easing up on the political humor for a while."

Joe Matar of Den of Geek rated the episode 2.5 out of 5 stars, and wrote: "'Doubling Down' isn't funny or well-plotted. It's relentlessly dark and cruel and – though I can appreciate some of the darkness of the Garrison plot and enjoy some of the broader plot developments about the Cartman, Heidi, and Kyle love triangle – the storytelling is ultimately too scattershot."

Jeremy Lambert of 411Mania rated the episode a 7.3 out of 10, stating that the episode "tried to blend the serial story with the ability to stand-alone and the mix came out weird due to prior episodes this season. Still, the plot of the episode was Cartman vs. Kyle and that always works."
