= Franchise Prequel =

- South Park episode
- Episode no.: Season 21; Episode 4
- Directed by: Trey Parker
- Written by: Trey Parker
- Production code: 2104
- Original air date: October 11, 2017

Episode chronology
← Previous "Holiday Special"	Next → "Hummels & Heroin"
- South Park season 21

"Franchise Prequel" is the fourth episode in the twenty-first season of the American animated television series South Park. The 281st overall episode of the series, it first aired on Comedy Central in the United States on October 11, 2017.

This episode parodies the Marvel Cinematic Universe and the spread of fake news through sites such as Facebook while also serving as a lead-in to the launch of the video game South Park: The Fractured but Whole.

== Plot ==
Eric Cartman and his classmates are planning to launch a superhero franchise with an original Netflix series for their "Coon and Friends" alter egos, but are slandered by fake news stories on Facebook accusing them of burning the American flag and engaging in various sex acts, which damages their reputations. The boys learn Butters Stotch is behind this, but he refuses to stop, as he engages in this activity in the guise of his supervillain identity, Professor Chaos, and has started a company to spread fake news for profit. A Netflix staffperson tells Cartman they cannot approve their series until the problem of the damaging information about them is removed from Facebook.

Troubled by the fake stories, the boys' parents decide to invite Facebook chairman and CEO Mark Zuckerberg to a town assembly so he can provide insight on the matter. During his speech, he does not address the citizens' concerns, instead dismissing their complaints and pretending to deflect their attempts to "block" him by speaking and moving in the style of blocking techniques from martial arts films. After the unsuccessful assembly, he continues to irritate the townspeople by appearing uninvited in their homes and vehicles, showing up at restaurants to eat people's food, and acting as if everyone else's property is his. The townspeople complain to the police about his behavior, who inform the public that they cannot interfere with Zuckerberg's actions because they invited him to town, and let him into their lives.

When Coon and Friends confront Butters at his headquarters, Zuckerberg appears, having been paid by Butters to protect him, preventing Coon and Friends from removing the slanderous information from Facebook. Cartman then devises a plan: He and the other boys attack him in front of the other townspeople, who cheer them on. Zuckerberg fights back, beating the children, but Cartman publicly laments that his allies were merely protesting on behalf of persecuted groups like black people and the handicapped, and informs Zuckerberg that the video of him beating the children is being broadcast on Facebook Live. Zuckerberg panics and shuts down the site to prevent the video from spreading further, ending Butters' scheme.

Butters' father, Stephen, furiously drags Butters to Russian President Vladimir Putin's office in Moscow, an enraged Stephen rebukes Butters for what he has done, and then does the same to Putin for giving him the idea in the first place. The boys are now able to proceed with their franchise plan, but then split up over disagreements related to the franchise's release schedule.

== Reception ==
Jesse Schedeen from IGN rated the episode an 8 out of 10, saying "While not the strongest episode of the season so far, 'Franchise Prequel' serves as an enjoyable lead-in to The Fractured But Whole while also lampooning recent Facebook controversies. This episode could have done a little more with its Mark Zuckerberg parody. However, the return of Professor Chaos, the scathing critique of fake news and the adults who read it and the terrific ending more than made up for any problems."

Jeremy Lambert with 411 Mania rated it a 5 out of 10, stating "It's tough to judge 'Franchise Prequel' given that it's 100 percent linked to the release of next week's South Park video game The Fractured But Whole. Some of the stuff that seemed out of nowhere and meaningless in tonight's episode may make sense once we go through the entire story of the videogame." He also added the episode "may be a prequel to the game or it may be a 30-minute (with commercials) advertisement for the game. Either way, it didn't feel like your regular episode of South Park."

The A.V. Club contributor Dan Caffrey gave the episode a C+ rating, commenting that "By the end, 'Franchise Prequel' takes some timely jabs at Marvel's byzantine rollout plan for its cinematic universe, as well as our own complicity in the fake news problem by relying so much on Facebook to begin with. But neither of those elements get more than a scene. Most of the episode just focuses on the kids pretending to be superheroes, which I suppose that makes for an alright video game commercial."
