= Hummels & Heroin =

- South Park episode
- Episode no.: Season 21; Episode 05
- Directed by: Trey Parker
- Written by: Trey Parker
- Production code: 2105
- Original air date: October 18, 2017

Guest appearances
- Josh Gad as Marcus Preston and Ms. McGullicutty

Episode chronology
← Previous "Franchise Prequel"	Next → "Sons a Witches"
- South Park season 21

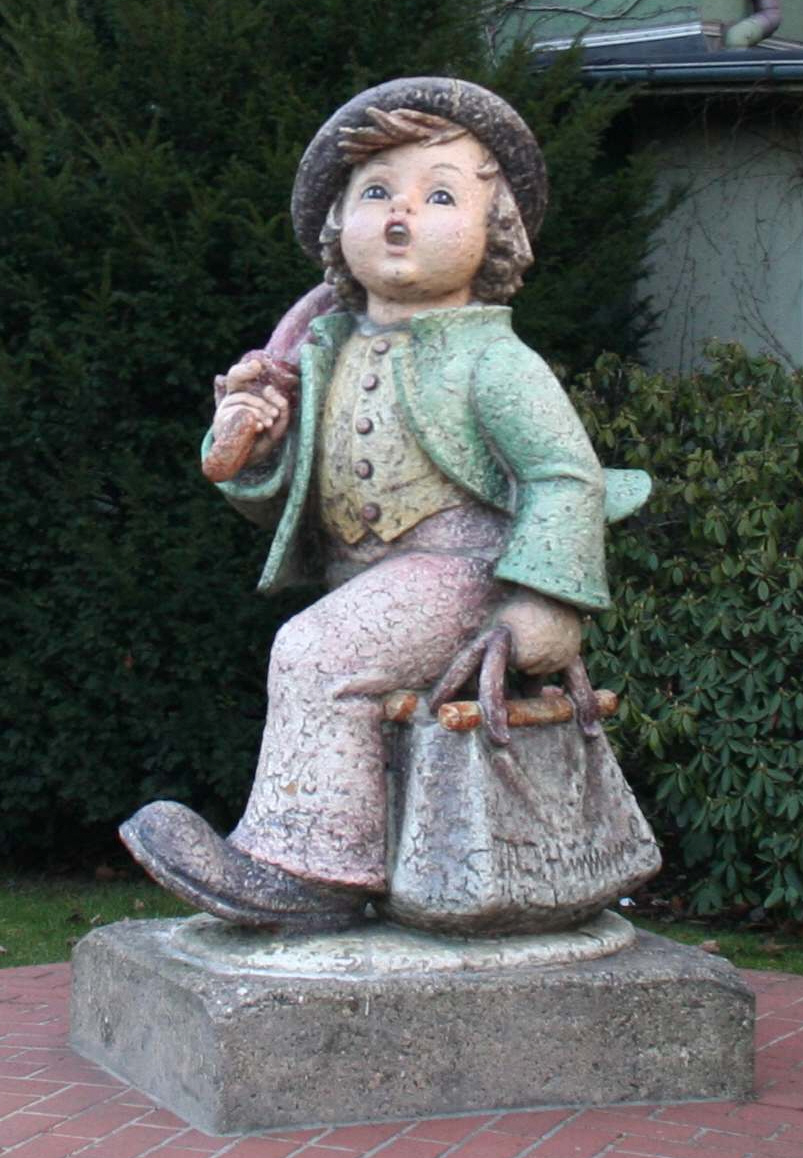
Statue of a Hummel in front of the W. Goebel porcelain factory

"Hummels & Heroin" is the fifth episode in the twenty-first season of the American animated television series South Park. The 282nd overall episode of the series, it premiered on Comedy Central in the United States on October 18, 2017.

This episode parodies the opioid epidemic while also comparing life in a retirement community to that in prison.

== Plot ==
A child named Marcus Preston has a birthday party where a costumed character entertainer of Chuck E. Cheese vomits and dies from having overdosed on painkillers as the police are unable to locate the source of the drugs. Stan Marsh goes to a retirement home to visit his Grandpa Marvin and brings him a present of a Hummel figurine. Grandpa tells Stan he must deliver a pillow made by another resident, Ms. McGillicudy, who has become the "top bitch" at the home. Stan later exchanges it for a limited-edition Hummel with another costumed character of Swiper the Fox. At school, Marcus hosts an assembly mourning the recent deaths of multiple costumed characters due to overdoses from painkillers, including the now-deceased Swiper. Stan realizes he has unknowingly been a drug mule, as the boys try to convince Stan to turn in his Grandpa. At the retirement home, Grandpa explains to Stan that McGillicudy's collection of Hummels has put her in power, as she vaguely threatens both Stan and Grandpa if they do not cooperate with her. Marcus visits a coroner's office for the autopsy of Chuck E. Cheese where the coroner reveals that the entertainer, along with all of the other recently deceased costumed characters, had Hummels stashed in his anal cavity.

Marcus confronts Stan about his recent increase of Hummel purchases and threatens to expose Stan if he is involved. Stan begs the boys for help, as he plans to steal McGillicudy's Hummel collection and give them to Grandpa, thus making him the one in charge, so Eric Cartman comes up with a plan. Marcus rushes to another birthday party where an entertainer dressed as the character Peppa Pig reveals to him the connection between Hummels and old people before Peppa dies. At the retirement home, the boys dress up and sing as a barbershop quartet while Stan finds McGillicudy's room and puts the Hummels into a large sack. There, he is confronted by Marcus but Stan convinces Marcus to instead go after the people really responsible for the death of Chuck E. Cheese. Stan brings the sack of Hummels to Grandpa but is confronted by McGillicudy. Grandpa uses the sack of Hummels to beat down McGillicudy and her companions to become the new "top bitch" of the nursing home and sending McGillicudy to "solitaire" confinement, while Marcus visits a convention of pharmaceutical doctors to ask them some questions.

== Production notes ==
Rap artist Killer Mike performed an original song for this episode titled "They Got Me Locked Up In Here".

== Critical reception ==
Jesse Schedeen from IGN rated the episode a 5.8 out of 10, and thought the episode "was definitely a miss, failing to offer the same insightful look at the struggles of South Park's elderly citizens we've seen in past episodes. This episode still had some strong moments, especially where the musical numbers were concerned, but it still serves as a low point for Season 21 so far."

Jesse Longo with Den of Geek rated it 2.5 out of 5 stars, commenting that "The episode was less of a trip and more of a mellow high. I've written time and time again that South Park feels disjointed when they squish three plots into 22 minutes or mix and match elements of current events."

Dan Caffrey with The A.V. Club gave the episode an A− rating, and he noted in his review that "As a society, we worsen drug epidemics by keeping people relegated to the awful circumstances that drove them to sell or use the stuff in the first place. That generalization is fine by me. I'm not sure what else Trey Parker and Matt Stone would have to say about the matter outside of the general shittiness of it all, and because 'Hummels & Heroin' works in service of story escalation rather than a sharpened moral, it ends up being the first truly gut-busting episode of season 21."
