= Moss Piglets (South Park) =

- South Park episode
- Episode no.: Season 21; Episode 8
- Directed by: Trey Parker
- Written by: Trey Parker
- Production code: 2108
- Original air date: November 15, 2017

Episode chronology
← Previous "Doubling Down"	Next → "Super Hard PCness"
- South Park season 21

"Moss Piglets" is the eighth episode of the twenty-first season of the American animated television series South Park. The 285th overall episode of the series, it first aired on Comedy Central in the United States on November 15, 2017.

This episode parodied the declining viewership and attendance of the National Football League due to the national anthem protests.

== Plot ==
At South Park Elementary, the special education class is having a science fair, and Nathan and his sidekick Mimsy plan to win the fair with a baking soda volcano diorama in order to impress girls. Timmy and Jimmy are also partners in the fair and are studying water bears, having learned about them from watching Octonauts. They have discovered that the water bears dance to Taylor Swift's music and Nathan is concerned that his experiment will lose to theirs. Later, he and Mimsy sabotage the water bears by adding lye and a plugged-in hair iron to the bowl containing the water bears. Instead of killing them, the water bears advance socially and can now dance the hokey pokey. The next day, a helicopter filled with men in black suits and sunglasses arrive and state that they are there to help with the water bears experiment as they believe that water bears are somehow the key to their survival, and they demand the rest of the special education students to disregard their projects and focus solely on the water bears. When Nathan and Mimsy try to take credit for the water bears progression and refer to them as government workers, they reveal that they are actually with the National Football League (NFL) led by Jerry Jones. Jimmy believes that they are there to study the water bears' resilience in order to reduce concussions, but Jones reveals that they are actually interested in the water bears in order to turn them into fans and help increase their decreasing ratings from national anthem protests.

Meanwhile, the girls at school become concerned for Heidi Turner, who has become fatter and adopted Cartman's aggressive and self-centered mannerisms since getting back together with him. Heidi is brought to Mr. Mackey's office where she is asked to be the judge for the science fair as she had previously volunteered to do so. Heidi objects but Mr. Mackey forces her to cooperate. Heidi continues to complain to others about judging the science fair and holds a school assembly to complain about the funding of what she considers frivolous programs such as the science fair. When Cartman raises objections to her behavior in the assembly, she is aggressive towards him as well.

Heidi's complaints at the assembly force Mr. Mackey and PC Principal to cancel the science fair, but when they inform the special education class of this, the NFL men draw guns on them and force them to continue the experiment. Heidi demands that Cartman do something, but when he calls her a "bitch", she forces him to change his tone and words. As the experiment progresses, Heidi steals the bowl of water bears and attempts to escape. Heidi is cornered and when Cartman begs Heidi to stop and to return to her old ways, she instead drinks the bowl of the water bears. The two later watch television together as she continues to be aggressive and demanding towards him while the NFL men begin studying Nathan's volcano.

== Critical reception ==
Dan Caffrey of The A.V. Club gave the episode a B− rating but did not like how Nathan and Mimsy were used in the episode, stating "While there are some minor laughs to be had at the absurdity of Jones' boneheaded solution and its gradual reveal, the second half of 'Moss Piglets' more or less eliminates Jimmy, Timmy, Nathan, and Mimsy from the narrative. With the focus having shifted to the NFL's efforts to boost its ratings, we're left without an anchor."

Jesse Schedeen of IGN gave the episode an 8.6 out of 10 rating and summarized in his review that "'Moss Piglets' showcases South Park doing what it does best – telling a mostly standalone story about the kids getting into wacky shenanigans with a sprinkle of continuity and a dash of topical humor. While this episode dabbled in some familiar subject matter, it managed to deliver an entertaining take-down of the NFL and establish Heidi as a true force to be reckoned with. This episode worked as a great, self-contained romp, but there's potential to keep building from here."

Chris Longo of Den of Geek gave the episode a 2 out of 5 stars rating, stating in his review that "The promise of Nathan and Mimsy took a backseat to Jerry Jones and the NFL searching for new fans to make up for people tuning out the NFL because of protests, concussions, or because generally the league puts out a trash product on a weekly basis. Even for viewers fed up with the NFL, the storyline came out of nowhere, barely connects to the glorious Water Bears, and wastes the potential of Nathan and Mimsy, and Jimmy and Timmy for that matter."

Jeremy Lambert of 411Mania gave the episode a 7 out of 10 rating and summarized his review stating "'Moss Piglets' was another good episode in a very strong season. I'm always up for a Nathan/Mimsy vs. Jimmy/Timmy battle. I'm also up for seeing a female version of Cartman, especially when it was done as well as it was. There was nothing bad about this episode, and it's another episode that plays now and years from now, but it did feel like a step down from previous episodes in the series."
