= Help, My Teenager Hates Me! =

- South Park episode
- Episode no.: Season 25; Episode 5
- Directed by: Trey Parker
- Written by: Trey Parker
- Production code: 2505
- Original air date: March 9, 2022

Episode chronology
← Previous "Back to the Cold War"	Next → "Credigree Weed St. Patrick's Day Special"
- South Park season 25

"Help, My Teenager Hates Me!" is the fifth episode of the twenty-fifth season of the American animated television series South Park. The 316th episode overall of the series, it premiered on Comedy Central in the United States on March 9, 2022. This episode features the boys having to learn to deal with the angst and frustration of teenagers, as the boys want to play Airsoft and find teenagers are their only willing participants.

== Plot ==
Fourth grader Kyle Broflovski begs his father Gerald to allow him to purchase an Airsoft gun so he can play with his friends Stan Marsh, Eric Cartman, and Kenny McCormick. Gerald is warned by the Airsoft store employee that mostly teenagers play this game. At the Airsoft field, the teenagers there complain that playing against fourth graders would be too easy, so the field manager splits the teams into two groups, each one consisting of two teens paired with two fourth graders. The younger boys enjoy the game, but after returning home, the mother of Kyle's teenage partner, Trevor, drops him off at Kyle's house, stating, "He said he's your teenager now." Kyle's friends are also assigned to take care of their teenage partners, who are moody like Trevor. The fourth graders are ill-equipped to deal with this, and it hampers the next partnered Airsoft game.

Following advice from the book Help, My Teenager Hates Me!, Kyle suggests taking their teenagers camping, though the teens' feelings of alienation continue. Kyle tells Gerald that he no longer wants to play Airsoft because of the teens. Gerald suggests that the children instead play with him and the other fathers, Randy Marsh and Stuart McCormick. At the Airsoft range, the children and the teens challenge one another to one last battle, with the losing team agreeing to never play at the Airsoft range again. As the bet is made, the fathers arrive along with Jimbo Kern. During the game, Randy places a jar of marijuana in the field to lure the teens out into the open. As the teens approach it, Randy throws an airsoft grenade at them, knocking them all out at once. As the boys and the adults head toward Eric's home for a victory meal, Randy, brandishing his rifle, asks the other men if he should "take them out now", but Gerald stops him, saying that they still have a few more years before the children "turn into monsters".

== Reception ==
Dan Caffrey with The A.V. Club gave the episode a "C+", calling it "frustratingly one-note" and stating in his review that "The problem is, the nonstop apathy and frustration of the teenagers becomes boring to watch. While [Trey] Parker and [Matt] Stone are undoubtedly commenting on the real-life challenges that can come with raising an adolescent—the selfishness, the lethargy, the irritability—the flatlined demeanor feels out of place on a show like South Park." He also noted that the final Airsoft battle scene featured "jerky camera movements reminiscent of gritty war films like Saving Private Ryan, Black Hawk Down, and The Hurt Locker."

Max Nocerino with Future of the Force gave the episode a B+, while the website rated the episode four out of five stars. Nocerino ended his review stating "This episode was extremely, subtly funny. It wasn't brute force in your face offensive. It simply exaggerated a very common trope of American life. Teenagers 'hate' their parents and parents don't know how to reach them. I enjoyed myself and laughed out loud several times, which is a good sign (at least for me)."
