= Splatty Tomato =

- South Park episode
- Episode no.: Season 21; Episode 10
- Directed by: Trey Parker
- Written by: Trey Parker
- Production code: 2110
- Original air date: December 6, 2017

Episode chronology
← Previous "Super Hard PCness"	Next → "Dead Kids"
- South Park season 21

"Splatty Tomato" is the tenth episode and the season finale of the twenty-first season of the American animated television series South Park. The 287th overall episode of the series, it premiered on Comedy Central in the United States on December 6, 2017.

The episode, which parodies support for Donald Trump among white middle-class Americans, depicts the people of South Park as they deal with sightings of President Garrison that frighten their children, likening him to the antagonists of popular works of horror, including Stranger Things and the 2017 feature film adaptation It. Subplots in the story focus on relationships among the regular and recurring characters, including the conclusion of Eric Cartman and Heidi Turner's relationship, and a burgeoning romance between PC Principal and Strong Woman, with which the episode explores the themes of self-victimization and cultural views of workplace relationships. The episode's title is a reference to the icon used to denote films with low critical scores on the review aggregator website Rotten Tomatoes.

== Plot ==
President Garrison has been spotted repeatedly in South Park, frightening the young daughter of Bob White and his wife with his constant inquiries about his approval rating. According to a local law enforcement official, Officer Bright, Garrison has become desperate and dangerous ever since he was given a "splatty tomato" approval rating. The Whites, who remain loyal supporters of Garrison, believe that their daughter's anxieties are caused by the political liberalism of the school administrators at South Park Elementary, PC Principal and Strong Woman, complaining, "No one cares about the Whites."

Sightings of Garrison continue, his presence heralded by red balloons bearing the campaign slogan "Make America Great Again", which Randy Marsh and the children of South Park realize bears similarities to Stranger Things and It. In the aftermath of his attack upon Toronto with a nuclear bomb in the previous episode, which killed over a million Canadians, Prime Minister Justin Trudeau demands that Garrison be handed over to Canada, a call to which the Canadian-born Ike Broflovski responds. After he disappears, his brother Kyle Broflovski embarks on a search, joined by Stan Marsh, Tweek Tweak, Craig Tucker, Eric Cartman, and Heidi Turner. Heidi's recent behavior spurs Kyle to denounce the person that she has become, humbling her.

At a town meeting, Mayor McDaniels tells the townspeople that Officer Bright is leading the search for Garrison. When she assures the assembled crowd that she understands that they all wish to get rid of Garrison, Bob White objects. When Randy points out to White all the things Garrison has been doing, White responds that Hillary Clinton would not have been any better. When Bright informs the public that authorities have set up a "fox trap" to capture Garrison, which is actually a fake interview with Fox News, the Whites help Garrison evade it by warning him. Randy and his neighbors search the woods, and when they find a campsite, they discover in the tent PC Principal and Strong Woman in bed together. The sight of two co-workers in a relationship horrifies Randy and the others, who vomit in response.

Ike, wearing the uniform of a Canadian Mountie, captures Garrison and drags him bound and gagged back into town. This provokes Bob White to pull out a gun, but Heidi then grabs it and holds Cartman at gunpoint. She blames him for the person she has become, but Heidi later realizes that she has been engaging in self-victimization ever since she began seeing Cartman. He threatens to kill himself again, but Heidi, no longer moved by his attempts at manipulation, finally breaks up with him for good. As this occurs, Garrison escapes. Stan fears that Garrison cannot be destroyed, but Randy states that "it is up to the Whites".

== Critical reception ==
Dan Caffrey of The A.V. Club gave the episode a "B−" rating but did not like how President Garrison was used in the episode, commenting "Whenever a Trump/Garrison storyline goes nowhere, it's likely because Parker and Stone just don’t have that much more to say about him."

Jesse Schedeen of IGN gave the episode a 7.9 out of 10 rating, commenting that the episode "didn't quite combine its many concurrent plot threads into a cohesive whole, but it did a better job of tying up loose ends than most. And in some ways, the lack of closure in the final moments only played into the larger themes and topical humor."

Joe Matar with Den of Geek gave the episode a 3.5 out of 5 stars rating, stating in his review "I don't usually find South Park laugh out loud funny these days and Season 21 has been mostly weak, so 'Splatty Tomato' was a nice surprise in that it was well-plotted, had some clever gags, and ended with a clear moral for Heidi, Cartman, and the Whites: 'if you always make yourself the victim, you can justify being awful.'"

Jeremy Lambert with 411Mania gave the episode a 6.5 out of 10 rating, stating in his review "The episode had some funny moments. The bad 80s music played for some nice laughs and I lost it at the FOX trap. But the goal of this episode didn't seem to be 'make people laugh.' It seemed to be 'make people realize that America sucks right now.' Mission accomplished, Matt and Trey."

Dani Di Placido with Forbes praised the episode in his review, stating "regardless of your political alignment, the overarching message from this season, to stop playing the victim, stop othering the opposing side, and to just calm the hell down, is difficult to argue with. Despite the show's reputation for reckless offensiveness, I would argue that South Park is one of the few voices of reason in the media landscape today."

Ben Travers with IndieWire gave the episode a B− rating, stating in his review "Parker and Stone have always skewered everyone. They'll go after the easy targets, like Trump, and the hard targets, like P.C. culture. Over 21 years, they've proven themselves incredibly smart and savvy satirists, and Season 21 had plenty of shining moments."
