= City People =

- South Park episode
- Episode no.: Season 25; Episode 3
- Directed by: Trey Parker
- Written by: Trey Parker
- Production code: 2503
- Original air date: February 16, 2022

Episode chronology
← Previous "The Big Fix"	Next → "Back to the Cold War"
- South Park season 25

"City People" is the third episode of the twenty-fifth season of the American animated television series South Park. It is the 314th episode overall of the series, and premiered on Comedy Central in the United States on February 16, 2022. The episode centers upon the reaction of the town of South Park to a mass migration from former city-dwellers, who are depicted with a pigeon-like clucking for staples of urban life, in a parody of gentrification, the series' first since the multi-episode storyline in Season 19.

== Plot ==
As a massive influx of people moves to South Park from larger cities, South Park Realtors hires Liane Cartman as a real estate agent to help deal with the workload, a job Liane needs because of the escalating rent resulting from the migration. Her fourth grader son, Eric Cartman, opposes this because she can no longer devote all of her attention to him.

When Cartman comes to believe that real estate agents really do not do anything, he founds his own company named South Park Realty Group, but shows up at the same house Liane is showing with prospective buyers of his own. Cartman begins showing up uninvited with his clients to the homes of local residents. When South Park Realtors see Cartman's ads, they resolve to improve their own, but suffer injuries attempting to imitate the posture Cartman exhibits in his photos. Their hopes improve when a resident tells them he wishes to sell his property, though it turns out to be a run-down, hot dog-shaped diner.

Mayor McDaniels and the local merchants on the Chamber of Commerce fear an exodus of residents if too many city people settle in the town. She has her staff arm themselves and storm the office of South Park Realtors, but find the staff critically injured after contorting their bodies during photoshoots. When both the merchants and Liane learn that Cartman is showing Tolkien Black's former home to city people, they all converge upon that home.

As Liane admonishes Cartman for his activities, the Chamber of Commerce members arrive and fire upon the house. The Cartmans and the city people take cover, but Cartman refuses to relent. Liane then agrees to quit her job to devote all of her time to him, to which he accedes. As the city people leave South Park en masse, Liane tells the locals that she and Cartman are quitting real estate, prompting the locals to declare victory. The Cartmans are then relegated to the one property Liane can afford, the old hot dog diner. Though Cartman initially welcomes living in a hot dog, this changes when he checks the running water, and is doused with ketchup and mustard.

== Reception ==
Bubbleblabber gave the episode 9 out of 10 rating, praising its ability to work without the inclusion of three of the main four boys, along with its inclusion of secondary characters such as Liane Cartman and Lu Kim. The reviewer appreciated the critique of the "city people", commenting, "As someone who has grown up about 45 minutes from NYC, I can't say I agree with the assessment that they would all drive out to South Park in Teslas as most don't even drive cars... but LA residents would. Regardless, the personalities are spot on regardless of which coast you pick, and Matt Stone and Trey Parker know plenty about both in which to satirize. From douchey La Croix drinks and constant talk of pilates, I'm not sure a documentary about NYC/LA assholes could be more of a direct shot than what we were presented here."

Dan Caffrey of The A.V. Club gave the episode a "B+", primarily praising the parody of real estate agents, though noting that Parker and Stone did not seem to have much to say on the city people themselves. Caffrey commented, "'City People' never quite explodes into the kind of bonkers finale promised by the episode's front half, And yet the quieter look into Cartman and Liane's codependent relationship proves to be interesting in its own right... There's something both fascinating and depressing about seeing Cartman's mom—the butt of so many jokes over the years—take literal agency and try to make something of herself, only to be thwarted by her son's parasitic needs."

Liam Hoofe of Flickering Myth welcomed the show's return to gentrification as a target of their parody seven years after exploring that theme in a Season 19 storyline, praising Parker and Stone for finding a new angle with which to approach that phenomenon. Hoofe also thought that Cartman's decision to become a real estate agent to sabotage his mother's job was a "classic South Park set-up", which provided copious laughs in the form of gags about real estate agents, the pigeon-like clucking of the city people, and well-written one-liners by Cartman. More broadly, Hoofe pointed to the episode as a reason why Season 25 was "one of the finest in recent years."
