= White People Renovating Houses =

- South Park episode
- Episode no.: Season 21; Episode 1
- Directed by: Trey Parker
- Written by: Trey Parker
- Production code: 2101
- Original air date: September 13, 2017

Episode chronology
← Previous "The End of Serialization as We Know It"	Next → "Put It Down"
- South Park season 21

"White People Renovating Houses" is the first episode in the twenty-first season of the American animated television series South Park. It is the 278th episode of the series overall, and first aired on Comedy Central in the United States on September 13, 2017.

The episode parodied the use of smart speakers, such as Amazon Alexa, Google Home and Apple Siri, and the use of Confederate flags in the Unite the Right rally in Charlottesville.

== Plot ==
Eric Cartman and his classmates play with an Amazon Echo Smart speaker, giving it instructions that include profanity, and laugh when the device repeats the inappropriate language. Cartman immediately becomes depressed when his girlfriend Heidi Turner appears and interrupts their laughter, and she in turn becomes frustrated when he refuses to express his feelings. Meanwhile, Randy and Sharon Marsh have started a television series titled White People Renovating Houses that features the couple redesigning people's homes. One of their broadcasts is interrupted when a group of men waving torches and Confederate flags are shown in the background protesting smart speakers because they believe the products have left them unemployed. Randy is irritated by their protest, but later decides to help them get jobs in which they serve as replacements for the smart speakers by responding to users' voice commands.

Cartman is dismayed to find his Alexa Echo has been replaced with a human, one who refuses to repeat his inappropriate language. Another man, Darryl Weathers, has accepted the job as Randy's smart speaker, but soon finds the job demeaning and quits. Randy berates him for being closed minded about the future until Darryl reveals his frustration that he cannot knock down the load-bearing walls in his house via renovation without his second floor collapsing. Randy offers to prop the ceiling up while knocking down the wall and delights Darryl with his redesign of the house. Cartman finds a pile of abandoned smart speakers in an alley and takes them home. Heidi goes to Cartman's house to apologize for upsetting him, but his mother says she cannot get him to leave his room. He is then shown laughing as the smart speakers comply with his requests. Before Heidi can apologize to him when they arrive at school, he ends their relationship, saying that he cannot tolerate her "abusive" treatment of him, and walks away.

== Cultural references ==
The episode features the character "Jim Bob" performing a country-esque parody of American rapper Kendrick Lamar's song "Humble".

== Reaction ==
=== Technical occurrences ===
Ryan Parker, writing for The Hollywood Reporter, reported smart speakers belonging to multiple viewers, in particular Amazon Echos and Google Homes, reacted to the various commands Cartman spoke during the episode, including setting unwanted alarms and adding sexual items to shopping lists. Viewers reported on Twitter that they had to turn off their devices to prevent issues and posted videos of the reactions.

=== Critical reception ===
Jesse Schedeen from IGN rated the episode a 5.8 out of 10, writing that it "tackled many subjects and failed to combine them into a proper whole." Jeremy Lambert with 411 Mania rated it a 5.0 out of 10, stating "[the episode] didn't exactly provide hope for this year. There were some funny moments and I appreciated how Matt and Trey spun the narrative, but it didn't 'wow' me the way I was hoping."

The A.V. Club contributor Dan Caffrey gave the episode a C+ rating, commenting "Parker and Stone never take their redneck/white nationalist stereotypes far enough from the source material for it to work as a joke that can stand on its own. And because they borrow so heavily from the Charlottesville protests without ever fully skewering the participants, the episode doesn't work as social commentary, either." Writing for Den of Geek, Chris Longo gave it 2.5 out of 5 stars, and stated "From a show that had more biting satirical commentary on topics like Safe Spaces and PC culture, George Zimmerman, and Black Lives Matter, I expected a much stronger response to the events of Charlottesville from a South Park season premiere."
