= Pajama Day =

- South Park episode
- Episode no.: Season 25; Episode 1
- Directed by: Trey Parker
- Written by: Trey Parker
- Production code: 2501
- Original air date: February 2, 2022

Episode chronology
← Previous "South Park: Post COVID: The Return of COVID"	Next → "The Big Fix"
- South Park season 25

"Pajama Day" is the twenty-fifth season premiere of the American animated television series South Park. The 312th episode overall of the series, it premiered on Comedy Central in the United States on February 2, 2022, and was simulcast on Logo, MTV, MTV2, Paramount Network, Pop, and TV Land. It is the first South Park episode to air in its regular time slot since "Christmas Snow", which premiered December 11, 2019.

== Plot ==
At South Park Elementary, Mr. Garrison introduces the fourth grade class to his new boyfriend, Rick. However, he gets a phone call from another boyfriend, Marcus, and the students fail to cover for him, an angered Garrison excoriates the students, and tells PC Principal, who has overheard the commotion, that the children are unresponsive and unfocused. Admonishing the students for not appreciating their teacher, PC Principal forbids them from wearing pajamas on Pajama Day, which is described as the "Met Gala for children". When the students complain, he furthermore admonishes them not to invoke Nazi Germany when they fail to get what they want, which serves as a recurring gag in the episode. He also tells counselor Mr. Mackey that if he changes his mind, he will look weak.

The punishment results in a backlash on the part of the townsfolk, who protest PC Principal's actions by wearing pajamas throughout the day, including in the workplace. Seeing that his decision has backfired, PC Principal tells fourth grader Wendy Testaburger her class must resolve this problem, resulting in a schism among the local workforce, and arrests of people who refuse to wear pajamas, as well as those who engage in criminal behavior in their attempts to shame them. As riots and arrests escalate, Police Sergeant Harrison Yates observes that the town is turning into a powder keg.

At an afterschool meeting, Wendy suggests that they apologize to Garrison. The next day an elated Garrison tells the class he has decided to be with Rick, but when he sees Butters Stotch is not paying attention to his anecdote, it results in another angry tirade by him and PC Principal. As town-wide conflict and allusions to Nazism continue, however, PC Principal tells Wendy that her class can wear pajamas, and that he will resign. However, when Wendy mentions that they still have Opposite Day to look forward to, this gives PC Principal an idea. He announces to the school that due to a calendar error, it is actually not Pajama Day, but Opposite Day, when students are allowed to wear what they want, which means the fourth graders can wear pajamas. With the conflict resolved, the jailed citizens are released.

== Ratings ==
The season premiere ranked number one on cable that evening among the 18-to-49 demographic with a 0.44 rating, beating out NBA telecasts on ESPN, All Elite Wrestling on TBS, and a FIFA World Cup qualifying match on Fox Sports 1 featuring the United States men's national soccer team. ViacomCBS' simulcast of the episode across multiple other ViacomCBS networks added to those figures.

== Critical reception ==
Don Caffrey with The A.V. Club gave it a C+ rating, criticizing it as a "tired COVID joke", saying "It feels uninspired and just plain odd to see South Park symbolizing pandemic hysteria when the show tackled it in a much more literal fashion less than two months ago." Caffrey also observed that the pajamas in the episode were being used as a metaphor for objections to wearing masks during the COVID pandemic, stating "about halfway through, it becomes clear that the pajamas are a stand-in for masks during COVID-19—a joke that immediately deflates."

Charles Bramesco with The Guardian was critical of the episode, stating in his review "Parker and Stone continue to thrive on the non-commentary that their strategy of partial metaphor affords them, hiding behind the joke once it comes time to make a statement beyond the broadly agreeable. The divisiveness of pajama-wearing allows them to get a few good blows in, as in the scene that sees an anti-pajama-er declaring that he'll never be cozy again, a succinct summation of the self-defeating 'own the libs' philosophy currently dominating conservative thought."

Liz Shannon Miller with Consequence enjoyed the simplicity of the episode. In her review, she commented "What makes this such an effective season opener, though, is the fact that those touches of old-school South Park are accompanied by the usual sorts of evidence that this episode was written extremely recently...Hearts have been broken and lives ruined in the quest to do what's achieved here so easily: A funny story, well told."

Justin Epps of Bubbleblabber enjoyed the episode, giving it an 8.0 out of 10 and praising it for a smooth return to the normal episode format after two years of specials. During his review, he writes that "the show was extremely satisfying", and that "With a new crop of episodes and a few more specials heading to Paramount+, South Park fans should hold their head high with confidence that the 25th season shows no signs of declining quality."
