= Mr. Garrison's Fancy New Vagina =

- South Park episode
- Episode no.: Season 9 Episode 1
- Directed by: Trey Parker
- Written by: Trey Parker
- Production code: 901
- Original air date: March 9, 2005

Episode chronology
← Previous "Woodland Critter Christmas"	Next → "Die Hippie, Die"
- South Park season 9

"Mr. Garrison's Fancy New Vagina" is the first episode in the ninth season of the American animated television series South Park. It first aired on Comedy Central in the United States on March 9, 2005. In the episode, Mr. Garrison undergoes sex reassignment surgery after feeling like he is a "woman trapped in a man's body". Garrison's operation inspires Kyle and Kyle’s father Gerald to undergo cosmetic surgery themselves, as Kyle becomes a tall African-American boy and Gerald fulfills his childhood dream of becoming a dolphin.

Written and directed by series co-creator Trey Parker, the episode is rated TV-MA in the United States.

== Plot ==
Seeing himself as a "woman trapped in a man's body", Mr. Garrison decides to have a sex reassignment operation, performed by Dr. Biber of the Trinidad Medical Center (accompanied by a video clip depicting an actual sex reassignment surgery). He is later introduced as "Mrs. Garrison" at a supermarket. Meanwhile, Kyle is trying out for the all-state basketball team. However, his performance against his African American competitors is unimpressive (by a physical standpoint, considering that he is too small compared to his taller competitors), and the coach and Cartman tell him that "Jews can't play basketball". This depresses Kyle, and while he walks home with Stan, Cartman, and Kenny, Mr. Garrison tells the boys of his surgery.

At dinner, Kyle asks his parents what a sex change is, and while explaining the term, his mother Sheila insists that cosmetic surgery is an important and legitimate aid for people whose physical appearance contrasts with their self-image. However, in applauding Mrs. Garrison's courage, she inadvertently implies that Kyle's own problems can be solved similarly. Stan accompanies Kyle to Trinidad to see about the situation, and Biber suggests that Kyle should undergo a "negroplasty" to make him African-American, which outrages his parents when Kyle explains his plight. His father Gerald travels to the Institute in order to confront Biber, who spots Gerald's dolphin shirt, appeals to his affinity for dolphins and convinces him to undergo "dolphinoplasty" through DNA mutations, surgically altering his appearance to resemble a dolphin's. At his home, Mr. Garrison asks Mr. Slave to take him to bed, but Mr. Slave, upset that he was never asked his feelings regarding the operation, refuses and breaks up with him.

As he has now been persuaded to endorse cosmetic surgery, Gerald Broflovski allows Kyle to undergo the negroplasty. Meanwhile, Garrison, puzzled at not having had his period, believes he's pregnant and cheerfully decides to have an abortion, but the abortion provider says that due to lacking ovaries or a uterus, he cannot do any of the above. He demands Biber to change his sex back, but learns that the operation is irreversible, as his former testicles have been transplanted into Kyle's knees to make him taller, and his former scrotum fashioned into Mr. Broflovski's dorsal fin.

At the all-state basketball game, Garrison, Biber, Mr. Broflovski and the other three boys try to stop Kyle from playing basketball, as any jumping could cause Mr. Garrison's testicles to explode. In the dramatic climax, Kyle goes up to dunk and when he lands his new "kneecaps" explode, covering everyone in blood and other remains. Biber then apologizes to Kyle and Gerald, saying he should have told them that their surgeries were cosmetic only; he then offers to reverse the surgeries for a nominal fee, which they accept, as they are shown returned to normal in later episodes. Conversely, Mrs. Garrison, having lost her testicles, decides to accept her new gender, while breaking the fourth wall to the audience saying that she is staying a woman.

== Production ==
According to the DVD commentary for "Mr. Garrison's Fancy New Vagina", Trey Parker and Matt Stone came into the season with "basically no ideas". "Mr. Garrison's Fancy New Vagina" and "Die Hippie, Die" were the first two episodes that were brainstormed just prior to the start of the production season. Parker said that they originally had an idea for an episode about hippies and an episode where Garrison undergoes a sex change but just "basically winged" the rest of the season's episodes.

Parker stated that several days before this episode's air date, he was so stressed that he nearly "pulled a Dave Chappelle" and gave up. The scene in which Garrison undergoes his sex change originally featured over five minutes of real sex reassignment surgery footage because of the lack of ideas. Eventually, the surgery footage was trimmed to three brief one second shots after Comedy Central disapproved and after the idea of Gerald Broflovski's dolphin operation was brought up. The idea for Kyle wanting to play basketball came from Parker's desire to play for the Denver Broncos.
