= Die Hippie, Die =

- South Park episode
- Episode no.: Season 9 Episode 2
- Directed by: Trey Parker
- Written by: Trey Parker
- Production code: 902
- Original air date: March 16, 2005

Episode chronology
← Previous "Mr. Garrison's Fancy New Vagina"	Next → "Wing"
- South Park season 9

"Die Hippie, Die" is the second episode in the ninth season of the American animated television series South Park. The 127th episode overall, it originally aired on Comedy Central in the United States on March 16, 2005. In the episode, Cartman works to rid South Park from an infestation of hippies. The episode parodies the 2003 film The Core.

== Plot ==
Cartman has begun to run a 'pest control' service to rid the town of hippies. Having studied them in his quest to eradicate them, Cartman deduces they are about to start a music festival in South Park, but his attempts to warn the town council fail, and Cartman is arrested soon afterwards for imprisoning 63 hippies in his basement.

The town of South Park is soon invaded by the largest population of hippies in history, and the music festival threatens to destroy the town. A few of them from the University of Colorado Boulder manage to convert Stan, Kyle, and Kenny to their cause with talks of corporate evils, and the trio get caught up in the massive hippie crowd where they all listen to jam band music. Cartman pleads with the mayor to stop the festival, but she reveals that she signed the permit for the music festival, thinking it would make the town some money.

After seeing the chaos that the eccentric hippies are creating, the guilt-ridden mayor shoots herself in the head (she survives and appears later in the strategy room when Cartman is enacting his plan). Stan's parents know where the kids are, but when they realized what they did in Woodstock (which was very embarrassing and it’s strongly implied that this is how Shelley was made), they go to save Stan. Randy tries to get through the crowd but fails early due to excessive marijuana smoke exposure. The rest of the town then pleads with Cartman to dispel the hippies; Cartman eventually agrees to help, but only after Randy promises to offer a Tonka radio-controlled bulldozer and Kyle's mother assures Cartman that Kyle will never have one, instead having to watch Cartman playing with the bulldozer.

Meanwhile, Stan, Kyle, and Kenny realize that the hippies are doing nothing to oppose the corporations that they have demonized and that their idea of a perfect society parallels the currently existing one. They try to leave but the crowd is 7 miles (11 km) in radius and Stan's efforts to talk sense into the hippies fails. Cartman, aided by a scientist (Randy), an engineer (Butters Stotch's mother Linda), and a "black man to sacrifice himself in case anything goes wrong" (Chef), builds a giant drill to bore through the hippie crowd. While they are boring through, the drill breaks down and Chef goes out and "sacrifices" himself to pull the emergency power switch. The drill powers back to life and accelerates toward the stage, crashing into it and halting the music festival. Cartman then uploads the Slayer song "Raining Blood" into the speakers (as Cartman reasons, "hippies can't stand death metal"). The plan works and the hippies disperse, saving South Park, while Stan sees Randy and they end up hugging each other, knowing that they are safe. Cartman then pulls out a knife and tells Kyle that he has plans for him; Kyle is then forced to watch Cartman having fun with his Tonka bulldozer in the school parking lot.

== Production ==
According to the DVD commentary for "Die Hippie, Die", the episode is a spoof of the 2003 film The Core. Trey Parker and Matt Stone wanted to mix a "really terrible" movie like The Core with music festivals like Burning Man, Bonnaroo, and Woodstock.

In the first segment of the episode where Cartman is rounding up hippies, Cartman was originally dressed as Duane Chapman from the television series Dog the Bounty Hunter. However, Cartman's appearance was overhauled at the "last minute" because Parker and Stone felt that not many viewers would understand the reference. Cartman would later be dressed as Chapman in the season 10 episode "Miss Teacher Bangs a Boy".

This is the final episode of the entire series in which Isaac Hayes provided new dialogue for the character Chef.

== Reception ==
The episode is the subject of the opening chapter of David Sirota's 2011 book Back to Our Future. Sirota argues that Cartman's character can be read as encapsulating the 1980s conservative backlash against 1960s popular culture.

Slayer guitarist Kerry King found the episode humorous and expressed his interest in the show, mentioning it in an interview, saying "It was good to see the song being put to good use. If we can horrify some hippies, we've done our job."
