= Holiday Special (South Park) =

- South Park episode
- Episode no.: Season 21; Episode 3
- Directed by: Trey Parker
- Written by: Trey Parker
- Production code: 2103
- Original air date: September 27, 2017

Episode chronology
← Previous "Put It Down"	Next → "Franchise Prequel"
- South Park season 21

"Holiday Special" is the third episode in the twenty-first season of the American animated television series South Park. The 280th episode of the series overall, it first aired on Comedy Central in the United States on September 27, 2017. This episode parodies self-victimization via Native American hardships and trends toward opposition to Columbus Day.

== Plot ==
Chaos breaks out among the children at school in response to the cancellation of the day off on Columbus Day, due to an anti-Columbus Day campaign by Randy Marsh. Kyle Broflovski and Stan Marsh confront him with photos documenting how Randy himself has dressed as Columbus many times throughout his life, from his wedding to as recently as 2013. This leads to depression for Randy, who says he feels "indigenous", confusing the term with "indignant". Randy sees a commercial for a genealogy company called DNA and Me, which includes testimonials from Caucasians who came to identify as victims after discovering that they harbored trace amounts of DNA of historically oppressed ethnic groups. Randy decides to have the DNA in his saliva tested, though he pays a Native American man to French kiss him to ensure the test results indicate that he has Native American DNA. Disguising his voice, Kenny McCormick makes a call to Peter Galtman, the school official who cancelled the holiday, to get him to search the Internet for Randy's past photos, but Galtman refuses, as he believes everything on the Internet is fake news.

As Randy desperately tries to gather and dispose of his previous Columbus costumes, he is repeatedly visited by the Native American man he kissed, who has fallen in love with Randy. Randy rebuffs him, but during the man's second visit, a jogger films Randy, covered in the Columbus costumes he has been gathering, angrily kicking the Native American off his property. The boys later show this video to Galtman.

When Randy is informed by the DNA and Me staff of an "irregularity" from his test, they take a second, anal swab from him, in order to obtain more accurate results. He is informed that his DNA most closely matches that of a Caucasian British person, and that 2.8% of it is Neanderthal, which cross-bred with modern homo sapiens. An enraged Randy interprets this to mean that his ancestors were raped and eradicated by the ancestors of the DNA and Me staff. Returning home, Randy is confronted by Galtman, whom he punches for oppressing his ancestors, but the Native American man also appears, and implores Randy to cease his pretense, and face who he really is. Randy realizes that playing the victim has not solved his problems. At school, he announces that the school's Calendar Committee has reinstated the day off, which has been re-designated Indigenous Peoples' Day. Continuing to express belief that the word "indigenous" refers to negative feelings, he says this holiday will be for people to express such feelings, but the assembled crowd, offended at his ignorance, trades insults with Randy before gradually dispersing.

== Reception ==
Jesse Schedeen from IGN rated the episode an 8.5 out of 10, saying "While not quite as strong overall as last week's installment, 'Holiday Special' is the episode that best lives up to the promise of what South Park is supposed to be this year. This episode focused a bit less on topical humor and headlines, opting instead for a hilarious, Randy-driven storyline that hearkened back to the show's golden era. If this is a sign of what to expect from the remainder of Season 21, then things are looking pretty rosy for this series."

Jeremy Lambert with 411 Mania rated it a 7.8 out of 10, stating "[this episode] reminded me of episodes of South Park past. It didn't smack you in the face with current political affairs, it had Randy being crazy, and it had the boys working together in order to benefit them. Another strong episode in a season that is off to a good start."

The A.V. Club contributor Dan Caffrey gave the episode a B rating, commenting that the episode's "more entertaining" message was that "Randy's an idiot", and went on to add "It's a thesis we've heard many times before and will probably hear many times again. And unlike the episode's more substantial message, I'll likely never get tired of hearing it. As long as I don't think about it too much."

Writing for Den of Geek, Chris Longo gave it 3 out of 5 stars, and stated "What's been the saving grace for this show in the last decade has been using Randy Marsh as the wrench thrown into their playtime and the boys having to make the decision whether or not to dig him out of whatever mess he's created. 'Holiday Special' is just that, a Randy episode that features a real kid-friendly problem, the loss of a school holiday. For the third week in a row we get a fairly topical episode, as Randy is hell bent on removing the honors bestowed on Christopher Columbus."
