= Sons a Witches =

- South Park episode
- Episode no.: Season 21; Episode 6
- Directed by: Trey Parker
- Written by: Trey Parker
- Production code: 2106
- Original air date: October 25, 2017

Episode chronology
← Previous "Hummels & Heroin"	Next → "Doubling Down"
- South Park season 21

"Sons a Witches" is the sixth episode in the twenty-first season of the American animated television series South Park. The 283rd overall episode of the series, it originally aired on Comedy Central in the United States on October 25, 2017. The episode was seen by critics as parodying hypocrisy surrounding the Harvey Weinstein sexual abuse allegations.

== Plot ==
Gerald Broflovski, Randy Marsh, and their male friends celebrate the first night of Witch Week by meeting at a hilltop park called Sentinel Hill dressed as witches for a party where they dance in a circle around a fire, get drunk and smoke crack cocaine. Meanwhile, fourth grader Eric Cartman impatiently waits for his girlfriend, Heidi Turner, to finish getting ready for a pumpkin patch carnival. By the time they arrive there, many of the attractions have already closed, much to Cartman's irritation.

Chip Duncan, one of the men at the Witch Week party, reads from a spellbook from Salem, Massachusetts and transforms into a real witch. He takes flight on a broomstick, kidnaps some children, and attacks South Park with flaming pumpkin bombs, setting the carnival on fire. The carnival patrons, including Cartman and Heidi, are forced to flee, much to the protest of Cartman, who did not get to enjoy any of the attractions. The following day, Randy's wife Sharon confronts him about the news of Duncan's behavior, but Randy insists that he and his friends are not like Duncan, whom he labels a "bad witch."

At school the fourth grade boys, including Gerald and Randy's sons, Kyle Broflovski and Stan Marsh, discuss the witch, whom they assume is female. Fearing that their parents will forbid them from trick-or-treating, they decide they must do something, but Cartman, still angered over the previous night, can only stare threateningly across the room at Heidi, and when told that "we gotta do something to get rid of her," agrees, thinking they are talking about Heidi. When Sharon expresses disapproval of Randy's leaving for Day 2 of Witch Week, in light of Chip Duncan being on the loose, Randy refuses to abandon a decades-long tradition because of one bad witch. When Randy and his friends discover that Sentinel Hill has been closed off to the public, this confirms their perception that they are being persecuted for Duncan's actions in a manner akin to a witch hunt, though their avoidance of that term recurs as a running gag throughout the episode.

While Chip Duncan continues to attack the town and kidnap children, Kyle, Stan, Kenny McCormick and Butters Stotch meet at Kyle's house to research how to kill witches. Cartman arrives and instead proposes a plan to get rid of Heidi, and when Kyle and the others refuse this, Cartman storms out. At a school assembly the following day, Randy and his witch-garbed friends put on a musical number intended to convey the public service message that not all witches kidnap children, but merely the one bad one. While Stan and Kyle are unimpressed with this message, it inspires Cartman to invite Heidi to a Halloween costume party as part of a plan to dispose of her. That night he leads her down a dark, tree-lined path, where he leaves her to be confronted by Chip Duncan, who kidnaps her. When Stan and Kyle discover that Chip Duncan was part of the same witch's club as their fathers, and that they are all missing, they contact the one member of the club who has been absent from town: President Garrison.

Randy's fellow club member Stephen Stotch tries to convince him to publicly confess their crack cocaine use and the spells that he reveals that they placed on their wives. Randy asks him to wait until the following morning to do this, a delay that allows Randy to contact the others to have Stephen sacrificed to the Devil. Stephen is lured to a Ross Dress for Less parking lot, where they publicly accuse him in front of shoppers and the police of being the bad witch, but Chip descends before them on his broomstick. He reveals that he is using a magic satchel to carry the children and plans to use their souls to increase his power. President Garrison arrives in Air Force One and has Chip incinerated with a laser fired upon him from an orbital satellite. The police release all of the children from the bag except for Heidi, who is not fully ready, and tells the police she will be shortly. Rejoicing that Chip is now dead, Garrison and the witches leave to enjoy the rest of their Witch Week partying, but Cartman is again miserable when Heidi's procrastination delays their trick-or-treating.

== Critical reception ==
Jesse Schedeen of IGN rated the episode an 8.3 out of 10, summarizing his review with "South Park continues to establish a winning formula this season, focusing on more standalone storylines that still pull from current headlines in clever ways. 'Sons a Witches' works as both a commentary on the Harvey Weinstein scandal and its fallout and fun, simple tale of Randy and his friends being stupid."

Jeremy Lambert of 411Mania rated the episode an 8.2 out of 10, summarizing his review with "'Sons a Witches' builds on what has been, in my estimation, a strong season for the show. It had a timely story passed off as an evergreen story, a couple of classic scenes, and plenty of jokes that landed."

Charles Bramesco of Vulture rated the episode with one out of five stars, stating in his review "The one thing South Park won't do is take a side, insulating itself from criticism by hiding behind the 'equal-opportunity offender' line. As some cry that this is not normal, Trey Parker and Matt Stone can only shrug and respond that things have always been all messed up. Business as usual."

Dan Caffrey of The A.V. Club gave the episode a B+ rating, stating in his review, "'Sons a Witches' rightfully calls out that sort of self-righteous hypocrisy—the people who view themselves as different from the Harvey Weinsteins of the world, when in reality, they've taken advantage of the same gross power imbalance in Hollywood and elsewhere. While getting loaded and smoking crack in the woods may be a crass metaphor for the systematic nature of toxic masculinity, it fits right into South Park's wheelhouse of symbolism."

Chris Longo of Den of Geek rated the episode 3.5 out of 5 stars, and stated in his review that "The episode is better off and more effective by focusing on the toxic culture of masculinity that includes but extends far beyond Trump. And after all, isn't Trump the poster boy for a witch getting away with disgusting behavior anyway?"
