= Super Hard PCness =

- South Park episode
- Episode no.: Season 21; Episode 9
- Directed by: Trey Parker
- Written by: Trey Parker
- Production code: 2109
- Original air date: November 29, 2017

Episode chronology
← Previous "Moss Piglets"	Next → "Splatty Tomato"
- South Park season 21

"Super Hard PCness" is the ninth episode of the twenty-first season of the American animated television series South Park. The 286th overall episode of the series, it aired on Comedy Central in the United States on November 29, 2017. This episode parodies sexual harassment in the workplace in the United States, the rise in Netflix original shows, cancel culture, and the threat of nuclear war.

== Plot ==
A representative from Netflix speaks to Terrance and Phillip about creating a new series featuring them even though they are now both much older. At school, Eric Cartman and Heidi Turner have a physical fight but when Kyle Broflovski breaks them up he is teased by both Cartman and Heidi that he is acting like his mother Sheila, and they immediately reconcile. PC Principal holds an assembly about the bullying going on at school and introduces a new vice principal, Strong Woman. When PC Principal attempts to be assertive during Woman's speech to the assembly, she asserts herself and stops Principal. At Kyle's house, everyone gathers to watch the New Terrance and Phillip Show on Netflix. Kyle starts to feel bad for the people being farted on in the show, but is dismissed by his friends, who accuse him of mimicking his mother. Principal and Woman address the faculty and as Woman speaks, Principal envisions her with hearts floating around her while hearing "Hold My Hand". When the other faculty members also hear the music playing, Principal runs out of the room. After watching some Terrance and Phillip videos, Kyle goes home, removes a Terrance and Phillip T-shirt and cuts his hair. Principal sees a doctor about the music he is hearing after encountering Woman. The doctor suggests that Principal's mind makes the music because he is attracted to Woman, though he insists otherwise.

Kyle visits Strong Woman in her office and wants to work with her to stop the violence he believes Canada is causing but she turns him down. When Principal asks Mr. Mackey about Strong Woman having a boyfriend, Mackey warns him about relationships and sexual harassment in the workplace in the United States. Mackey decides to bring in someone from human resources to get Principal "back on track". Kyle is interviewed on the news about his new group he has formed, "Millennials Against Canada" (M.A.C.), and has a debate with the Canadian Minister of Streaming who also accuses him of acting like a Jewish mother. Principal has a human resources person named Miss Heather Conduct, who resembles Mr. Mackey, address the faculty. Miss Conduct performs a role-playing session with Mr. Mackey during which they both express positive feelings towards each other.

Kyle interrupts a taping of the Terrance and Phillip show with his group now wearing M.A.C. T-shirts similar to those worn by the Mothers Against Canada group in the film South Park: Bigger, Longer & Uncut. The Prime Minister of Streaming visits President Garrison to complain about the millennials, but they get into an argument which makes Garrison decide to prepare for the worst. A military alert causes everyone at school to evacuate to the gymnasium while the National Guard surround the Terrance and Phillip studios where Kyle and his millennials are at, and Kyle asks Garrison to do something to stop what he sees as hate coming from Canada. As Principal and Woman evacuate the school, they simultaneously turn a doorknob together, touching each other's hand in the process, and the music now plays for both of them. Meanwhile, Garrison launches and detonates a nuclear bomb in Toronto, as Kyle watches the event live through the news in horror.

== Critical reception ==
Dan Caffrey of The A.V. Club gave the episode a C+ rating, opening his review with the comment "Over the past year, South Park has often bitten off more than it can chew when it comes to current events. Tonight's episode takes on the fear of sexual harassment allegations in the workplace, Netflix's endless greenlighting of new series, the threat of nuclear war, and probably a few things I'm forgetting. And surprise, surprise, it's as unfocused and exhausting as it sounds."

Jesse Schedeen of IGN gave the episode a 7.7 out of 10 rating, summarizing in his review "'Super Hard PCness' is definitely a case where the plot could have used a little more time to cook. The various plot threads in this episode don't come together as a cohesive whole. Even so, the pieces are generally entertaining enough on their own."

David Crow of Den of Geek gave the episode a 3 out of 5 stars rating, stating in his review "Overall, it's a fun episode that has a literally explosive finale, however it is on the whole akin to the opening self-deprecation. As with Terrance and Phillip farting on a cow, the show is really missing a step nowadays, and self-aware irony can only paper over this truth so much."
