= The Big Fix (South Park) =

- South Park episode
- Episode no.: Season 25; Episode 2
- Directed by: Trey Parker
- Written by: Trey Parker
- Production code: 2502
- Original air date: February 9, 2022

Guest appearance
- James Troup as the Narrator

Episode chronology
← Previous "Pajama Day"	Next → "City People"
- South Park season 25

"The Big Fix" is the second episode of the twenty-fifth season of the American animated television series South Park. The 313th episode overall of the series, it premiered on Comedy Central in the United States on February 9, 2022. This episode retconned the name of the supporting character Token Black, establishing that his name is really Tolkien Black, and that he was named after The Lord of the Rings author J. R. R. Tolkien.

== Plot ==
Cannabis farmer Randy Marsh attends an exposition in which he learns that some people are boycotting farms that are not employing people of color. Randy speaks with his wife, Sharon, and their children, Shelly and Stan, about their lack of interaction with black people, in particular the fact that Stan never plays with his black classmate, Token Black. Stan invites Token and his parents, Steve and Linda Black, to the farm for dinner. During dinner, Randy and Stan learn that Token's first name is actually Tolkien, in honor of J. R. R. Tolkien. Stan also learns that he was the only one in his class who did not know this; when asking about a shirt Eric Cartman wore that said "Token", Cartman reveals he knew the name's origin but did not know how Tolkien was spelled. Steve accepts Randy's invitation to provide financial consulting for his cannabis business, Tegridy Farms, but is later angered to see a Tegridy Farms billboard using his likeness. When Randy gives Steve some of the profits resulting from the new ad campaign, Steve realizes that he is being commodified and that Randy is not actually interested in any of his ideas. Steve leaves the business.

Stan goes to a doctor, fearing that he is racist, having thought Tolkien's first name was a reference to tokenism. The doctor harshly criticizes Stan for having assumed such a thing, and he breaks the fourth wall to question whether "anyone else" believed the same thing. He suggests that Stan should do some reading from the perspective of a black person, but Stan misinterprets his advice and instead reads books by J. R. R. Tolkien, imagining the text being narrated by a racially caricatured black man. In class, Stan shares what he learned from J. R. R. Tolkien's work and suggests that it be made required reading. He later addresses a school assembly, declaring it to be J. R. R. Tolkien Appreciation Day, but, when he invites Tolkien up to speak, Tolkien declares that he hates J. R. R. Tolkien's work and the fact that he was named after him. Later, at Stan's house, Stan confesses to Tolkien his error regarding Tolkien's name. Tolkien says that his parents bought the cannabis farm across the road and named it Credigree Weed. Randy is incensed by this, and by the fact that Steve is using Randy's idea of exploiting black culture for profit and speaking in African-American Vernacular English to establish "street cred" with customers. Randy kicks Tolkien out of his house, promising to go to war with Steve. The episode ends with a gag public service announcement by the doctor, directed to those who thought Tolkien's name was really Token.

== Reception ==
Dan Caffrey with The A.V. Club gave the episode an "A" rating, praising the Tolkien theme of the episode, and stating, "Of all the outstanding Tolkien episodes throughout South Park's history, I'd be hard-pressed to find one as funny and insightful as tonight's 'The Big Fix,' in which fantasy mythology and weed-farming come together to take on the hefty task of satirizing performative allyship."

John Schwarz with Bubbleblabber rated the episode an 8 out of 10, commenting on South Park's history of racial discussion, stating "'With Apologies to Jesse Jackson' kind of introduced Matt Stone and Trey Parker's misconceived notions from white people as it pertains to black culture, 'The Big Fix' focuses on them just a bit more. It's an interesting conversation, however, it's interesting that we really didn't get a firm grasp on what the 'apology tour' should be, and perhaps, maybe even Matt and Trey are wrestling with this as well."
