= Put It Down (South Park) =

- South Park episode
- Episode no.: Season 21; Episode 2
- Directed by: Trey Parker
- Written by: Trey Parker
- Production code: 2102
- Original air date: September 20, 2017

Episode chronology
← Previous "White People Renovating Houses"	Next → "Holiday Special"
- South Park season 21

"Put It Down" is the second episode in the twenty-first season of the American animated television series South Park. The 279th episode of the series overall, it first aired on Comedy Central in the United States on September 20, 2017.

The episode's plot concerns Craig's attempts to assuage Tweek's anxieties over the contemporary issues parodied in the episode, including the relations between North Korea and the United States following the 2017 North Korean nuclear tests, distracted driving, and the impact of Donald Trump on social media.

== Plot ==
Tweek Tweak performs an emotionally charged song during a school assembly, in which he frantically warns of the growing tensions with North Korea, screaming at the apparent indifference of everyone. The boys urge his boyfriend, Craig Tucker, to calm Tweek's anxiety, but Tweek is further panicked by President Garrison's aggressive tweets to North Korea. Craig suggests sending cupcakes to North Korea to calm him down. Meanwhile, Eric Cartman and Heidi Turner have resumed dating after Cartman claims that Heidi was suicidal. However, Heidi gives Stan Marsh a voicemail by Cartman telling Heidi that he would commit suicide if she did not take him back. Heidi asks Stan to keep the voicemail secret but he shares it with the boys anyway, who make fun of Cartman. Cartman decides to raise awareness for his planned suicide but is told by PC Principal that the school is raising awareness for distracted drivers instead.

Tweek is calmed to learn that Kim Jong Un enjoyed the cupcakes he sent him, but his anxiety returns when Garrison goads North Korea by claiming that Tweek likely defecated in the batter. Cartman performs a song at school to raise awareness of his plans to commit suicide, but a student is hit by a driver distracted by the President's tweets. Cartman and Heidi campaign to raise awareness for suicide outside a store, but Cartman keeps telling passersby that he will kill himself if they do not get others involved. Heidi realizes that he is only interested in participating in this activity in order to get attention for himself.

North Korea fires a nuclear missile over Tweek's house, panicking Tweek further. Craig takes Tweek to Elitch Gardens to calm him, but their whereabouts are tweeted by Garrison, leading to more vehicular fatalities and injuries by drivers distracted by Garrison's tweets. When Craig continues his efforts, Tweek angrily says that Craig's constant use of logic and geopolitical facts is not what he needs, which frustrates Craig.

During lunch at school, a memorial service is announced for the students killed by distracted drivers, but Cartman interrupts this to announce a gathering for suicide awareness, saying he may commit suicide during it. Heidi tells Cartman to stop his selfish behavior, and when Cartman questions what the memorial service will solve, Heidi says that it does not aim to solve a problem, but that people in pain sometimes need help sorting out their emotions in order to properly express them, rather than quick answers. This prompts an epiphany for Craig, who rushes to Tweek's house. Instead of arguing with evidence or reasoning why his fears of North Korea are unfounded, he simply expresses sympathy for Tweek, who is then able to express that he feels scared, alone and powerless. Tweek's anxiety subsides, and he conceives an idea. At a school assembly, Tweek and Craig perform a song, "Put it Down", which urges people not to use their mobile devices if they are elected President, prompting members of the public to pledge not to do so. Cartman interrupts the song, joyfully declaring that he will not kill himself.

== Reception ==
Jesse Schedeen from IGN rated the episode a 9.0 out of 10, saying "While this new season didn't start off on the right footing, it clearly didn't take long for the series to find its groove again. 'Put It Down' is a perfect example of how the show can juggle topical humor while still keeping the focus on the citizens of South Park."

Jeremy Lambert with 411 Mania rated it an 8.0 out of 10, stating "After an average debut last week, 'Put It Down' was a great step in the right direction. It's an episode that could give you mixed feelings depending on your thoughts about suicide and suicide prevention, but by the end should make you appreciate what Matt and Trey were able to say and do. There still aren't enough laughs for my liking, but in this new South Park universe, this was a top-notch episode."

The A.V. Club contributor Dan Caffrey gave the episode a B+ rating, commenting "Even if the warning against obsessing over the news pales in comparison to the episode's more quietly powerful moment between Tweek and Craig, it's still good advice. But will anyone in the real world actually do it? Hell, will Parker and Stone actually do it? Probably not. And after an episode more focused, poignant, and yes, Trump-centric than last week's sloppy premiere, I'm not sure I want them to."

Writing for Den of Geek, David Crow gave it 4.5 out of 5 stars, and stated "This is brilliant satire. After swinging and whiffing in a major way last week by soft-pedalling the bigotry of the alt-right and the Charlottesville disgrace, Matt and Trey came out hard and channeled their own evident anxiety and dismay about having a madman with his hand over the red button in a staring contest with an even madder man with nukes of his own."

On July 12, 2018, the episode was nominated for a Primetime Emmy Award for Outstanding Animated Program.
