= Satire (film and television) =

Television and film genre

Satire is a television and film genre in the fictional, pseudo-fictional, or semi-fictional category that employs satirical techniques.

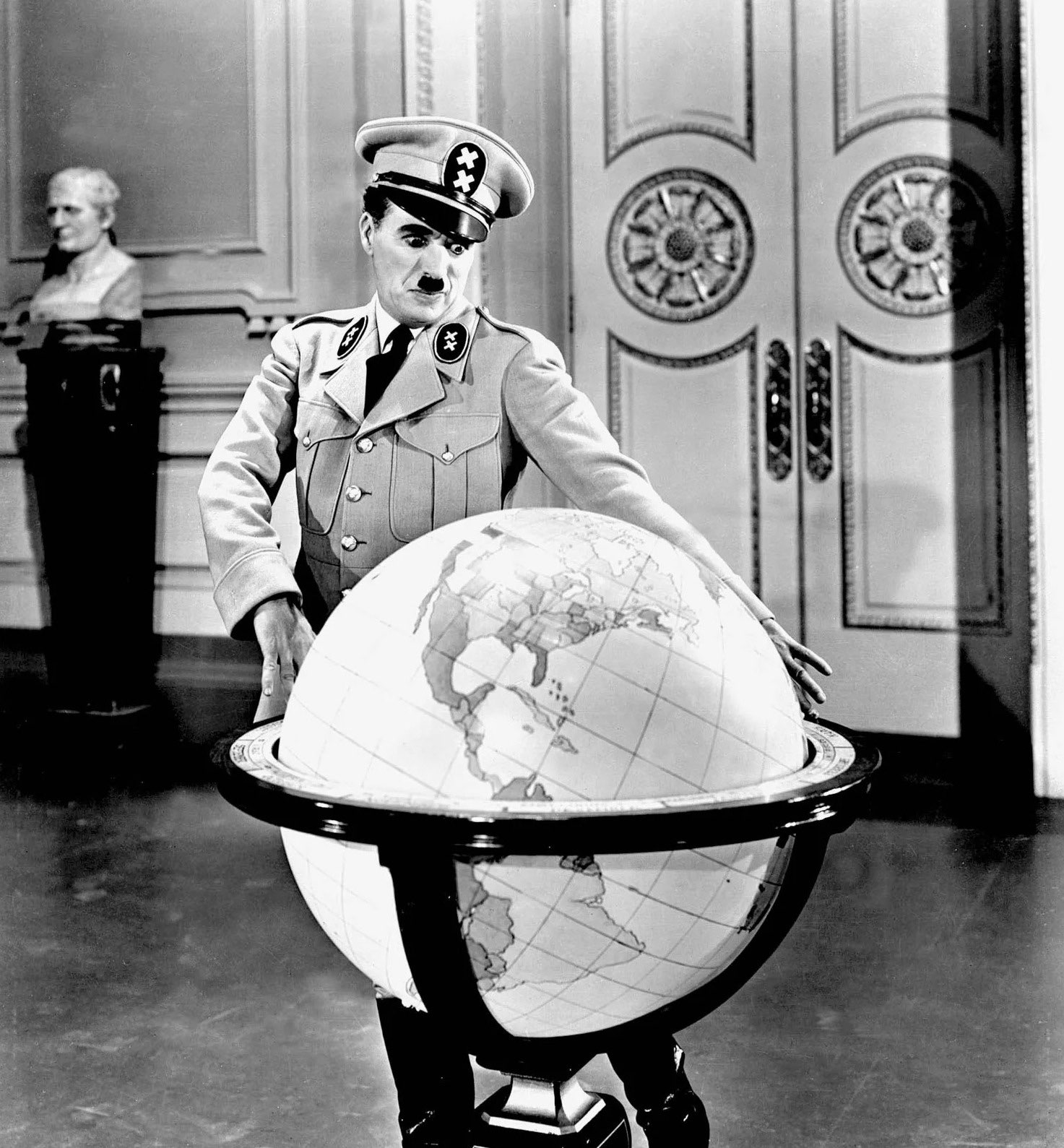
The Great Dictator (1940), one of the most famous examples of political satire in film, criticized the regime of Adolf Hitler.

== Definition and description ==
Film or television satire may be of the political, religious, or social variety. Works using satire are often seen as controversial or taboo in nature, with topics such as race, class, system, violence, sex, war, and politics, criticizing or commenting on them, typically under the disguise of other genres including, but not limited to, comedies, dramas, parodies, fantasies and/or science fiction.

Satire may or may not use humor or other, non-humorous forms as an artistic vehicle to illuminate, explore, and critique social conditions, systems of power ("social, political, military, medical or academic institutions"), hypocrisy, and other instances of human behavior.

== Backlash and censorship ==
Film director Jonathan Lynn generally advises against marketing one's work as "satire" because according to Lynn it "can substantially reduce viewing figures and box office" due to a presumed negative perception of satire in the [American] industry:

George S. Kaufman, the great Broadway playwright and director, and screenwriter, once said: 'Satire is what closes on Saturday night.' An excellent wisecrack, but it led the way to a general belief in America that satire is not commercial. When you pitch a satirical film idea, don't refer to it as satire. I used to, and I was met with the inevitable response that satirical films don't make money. This view is factually incorrect. Plenty have done so, if budgeted right.

Film, more than television, offers advantages for satire, such as the "possibility of achieving the proper balance" between realism and non-realism, using the latter to communicate about the former. The ideal climate for a satirical film involves "fairly free" political conditions and/or independent producers with "modest" financial backing.

United States
In the case of American satire, Roger Rosenblatt postulated that post-9/11 political climate "caused irony's death." Satire has been subjected to official and unofficial pressures concluding in self-censorship or outright removal of the material, with the reason given of satire not being economically viable. In the case of television, controversial content creators have been historically constrained by Federal Communications Commission regulations (Gray et al., p. 181), which threatens them with sanctions for airing alleged "indecent material" but also by industry and corporate watchdogs. Since the 1930s, with notable example being the Hays Office, there have always been organizations that "watch[ed] closely over media content to ensure it doesn't threaten the commercial climate in general and their products in particular." Typical pressures put on American satire that present topics of (anti-)war, patriotism, sex, religion, ethnicity, and race.

In another view, censorship and content sanitization cannot eliminate satire. Production of political satire between 1929 and 1960 was scarce but uninterrupted. Pro-government comic relief satire devoid of criticism was one strain of satire found on radio and television during the 1940s and 1950s that was "mass audience-oriented, nonradical," and focused on "[safe] plot lines [of] middle-class, suburban, white characters" typified by 1950s sitcoms, such as I Love Lucy, while the so-called edgier strain was rediscovered in the burgeoning stand-up comic scene in the late 1950s and forward. The latter was typified by comedy music albums of Tom Lehrer, standup comedy of Lenny Bruce, MAD magazine, and Chicago improvisational comedy troupe Second City.
Lebanon
The 1978 film Alexandria . . . Why? by Egyptian filmmaker Youssef Chahine was banned in Lebanon and other Arab countries for satirical references of the 1952 Egyptian revolution.
Russia
Satirical films about "life in Russia during the Stalin era" were banned. In the 1990s, Russian television show producers were charged with "tax evasion and illegal currency dealings" after airing an episode showing a critical caricature of Boris Yeltsin but those charges were dropped after television network president condemned this action.
(Georgia (country)) Georgia
The 1987 art film Repentance, initially banned in Russia and Russia-controlled Eastern Europe, only shown in Georgia before being internationally released in 1987 with permission of by-then head of state Mikhail Gorbachev, contained satirical allusions to Stalin. Academician Dmitry Likhachov considered the film "significant" for society as a whole: "The past does not die. It is necessary to publish in journals of mass circulation works which were not published in the past. The main theme in literature now is repentance." Other Georgian films that were banned include My Grandmother (revived 1976), an art film with surreal and satirical elements, and Saba, a satirical drama by Mikheil Chiaureli.

== Examples ==
=== Films ===
- À Nous la Liberté (1931)
- The Trial (1962)
- Dr. Strangelove (1964)
- Wild in the Streets (1968)
- Mr. Freedom (1969)
- Joe (1970)
- The Discreet Charm of the Bourgeoisie (1972)
- Death Race 2000 (1975)
- Network (1976)
- Dawn of the Dead (1978)
- Destiny (1978)
- The Atomic Cafe (1982)
- T-Bird at Ako (1982)
- Brazil (1985)
- Heathers (1988)
- They Live (1988)
- Pump Up the Volume (1990)
- Barton Fink (1991)
- Man Bites Dog (1992)
- Bullets Over Broadway (1994)
- Starship Troopers (1997)
- The Truman Show (1998)
- American Beauty (1999)
- Fight Club (1999)
- South Park: Bigger, Longer & Uncut (1999)
- Bamboozled (2000)
- Chicago (2002)
- Thank You for Smoking (2005)
- Idiocracy (2006)
- The Dictator (2012)
- The Interview (2014)
- Don't Look Up (2021)
- Ron's Gone Wrong (2021)
- Alice, Through the Looking (2021)
- Triangle of Sadness (2022)
- Hemet, or the Landlady Don't Drink Tea (2023)
- Digger (2026)

=== Television shows ===
==== UK ====
- Yes Minister (1980–1984)
- Yes, Prime Minister (1986–1988)
- The Day Today (1994)
- Brass Eye (1997, 2001)
- The Thick of It (2005–2012)
- Black Mirror (2011–), such as
  - "Fifteen Million Merits" (2011, #1.02)
  - "The Waldo Moment" (2013)
  - "Nosedive" (2016)

==== USA ====
- The Richard Pryor Show (1977)
- Mary Hartman, Mary Hartman (1978)
- Married . . . with Children (1987–1997)
- Mystery Science Theater 3000 (1988–1999)
- Tanner '88 (1988, mini-series)
- The Simpsons (1989–), such as
  - "The Front" (1993, #4.19)
  - "The Itchy & Scratchy & Poochie Show" (1997, #8.14)
- South Park (1997–), such as
  - "Jewbilee" (1999, #3.09)
  - "Red Hot Catholic Love" (2002, #6.08)
  - "The Death Camp of Tolerance" (2002, #6.14)
  - "I'm a Little Bit Country," (2003, #7.04)
  - "Christian Rock Hard" (2003, #7.09)
  - "Goobacks" (2004, #8.07)
  - "Stupid Spoiled Whore Video Playset" (2004, #8.12)
  - "Best Friends Forever" (2005, #9.04)
  - "Trapped in the Closet" (2005, #9.12)
  - "Smug Alert!" (2006, #10.02)
  - "Go God Go XII" (2006, #10.13)
  - "With Apologies to Jesse Jackson" (2007, #11.01)
  - "Britney's New Look" (2008, #12.02)
  - "The Tale of Scrotie McBoogerballs" (2010)
  - "Taming Strange" (2013)
- Family Guy (1999–)
- Reno 911! (2003–)
- Masters of Horror, episode "Homecoming" (2005, #1.06)
- The Sarah Silverman Program, episode "Face Wars" (2007, #2.09)
- The Boondocks (2005–2014)
- Better Off Ted (2009–2010)
- Community (2009–2015)
- The Amazing World of Gumball (2011–2019)
- Rick and Morty (2013–)
- Succession (2018–2023)
- The Boys (2019–2026)

==== Japan ====
- Key the Metal Idol (1994–1997)
- Paranoia Agent (2004)
