= 200 (South Park) =

- South Park episode
- Episode no.: Season 14; Episode 5
- Directed by: Trey Parker
- Written by: Trey Parker
- Production code: 1405
- Original air date: April 14, 2010

Episode chronology
← Previous "You Have 0 Friends"	Next → "201"
- South Park season 14

"200" is the fifth episode of the fourteenth season of the American animated television series South Park, and the 200th overall episode of the series, hence the name. It originally aired on Comedy Central in the United States on April 14, 2010. In the episode, Tom Cruise and all other celebrities who have been mocked by residents of South Park in the past plan to file a class action lawsuit against the town, but Cruise promises to end the lawsuit if the town can get the Islamic prophet Muhammad to meet him.

The episode was written and directed by series co-creator Trey Parker. To celebrate their landmark episode, Parker and fellow series co-creator Matt Stone combined many of South Park's past storylines and controversies. The Muhammad subplot, similar to the one previously featured in the season 10 episode "Cartoon Wars", refers to Comedy Central's past refusal to allow images of Muhammad to be shown on the network in response to the riots and threats generated from controversial cartoons in 2005 and 2007 of Muhammad in European newspapers.

"200" includes many celebrities that have been mocked in previous episodes, including Cruise, Rob Reiner, Steven Spielberg, Kanye West, Paris Hilton, George Lucas, Mel Gibson and Barbra Streisand. An additional subplot includes Cartman learning he may not know the true identity of his father. The season 2 episode "Cartman's Mom Is Still a Dirty Slut" claimed that Eric Cartman's mother Liane is a hermaphrodite and his father, but the events of "200" and the subsequent episode reveal that this is not the case.

Despite its controversial nature and eventual ban from the air, "200" received universal acclaim, and is considered by many fans to be one of the best episodes of the entire series. According to Nielsen Media Research, the episode was seen by 3.33 million viewers, making it the most watched cable television program of the night. Both "200" and the sequel episode "201" were nominated for the Primetime Emmy Award for Outstanding Animated Program in 2010. Within a week of the episode's original broadcast date, the website for the radical Muslim organization Revolution Muslim posted an entry warning Parker and Stone that they risked being murdered for airing the episode, which several media outlets and observers interpreted as a threat. As a result, Comedy Central heavily censored portions of "201" by removing references to Muhammad and the episode's closing speech. The episode was rated TV-MA L in the United States.

== Plot ==
While on a school field trip to a candy factory, Butters Stotch notes that actor Tom Cruise is seemingly employed by the factory: as he is packaging fudge into delivery boxes. Stan Marsh, who previously compared Cruise negatively to Leonardo DiCaprio, Gene Hackman, and "that guy who played Napoleon Dynamite" during the episode "Trapped in the Closet", accidentally insults him again by calling him a "fudge packer", though Cruise refutes this, claiming to be fly fishing. Outraged by the offensive remarks from Stan and his classmates and Mr. Garrison, Cruise recruits 200 celebrities who have been ridiculed by the town of South Park to bring a class action lawsuit against the townsfolk.

Stan returns to the factory with his father Randy in an attempt to convince Cruise to drop the suit, though Randy inadvertently insults Cruise once more: pointing out that Cruise is wearing an employee uniform for "Frederick's Fudge and Candies" whilst literally packaging fudge into boxes. Cruise begrudgingly agrees to drop the lawsuit on one condition: he meets the Islamic prophet Muhammad.

Randy delivers the news at the town meeting, which causes an uproar among the residents because any depictions of Muhammad is forbidden, fearing that forcing any images of Muhammad to appear in public will enrage the Muslims and they will bomb the town.

Stan and his friend Kyle Broflovski visit the Super Best Friends, a squad of superhero-like religious figures (Jesus Christ, Gautama Buddha, Moses, Krishna, Laozi, Joseph Smith and "Seaman") of which Muhammad is a member, to request the Muslim prophet return with them to South Park. Meanwhile, it is revealed that Cruise and the other celebrities only want Muhammad for his "goo", believing it will make them immune to ridicule, as Rob Reiner has invented "The Rob Ryder Goo Transfer Machine" to syphon Muhammad's "goo" into the celebrities.

By this time, Eric Cartman arrives with "Mitch Conner", a face painted on his hand as one-half of a ventriloquist act who had successfully impersonated actress Jennifer Lopez in "Fat Butt and Pancake Head". Cartman returns with Conner (again, disguised as Jennifer Lopez), attempting to join the other celebrities' lawsuit. Cartman is angered to learn that the celebrities have no interest in receiving cash settlements from the town, though he is reassured when Conner explains that he intends to steal Muhammad's "goo" to sell on the black market for a significant profit.

Meanwhile, Kyle and Stan convince the Super Best Friends to let Muhammad come to town on the condition that he remains in the back of a U-Haul truck and is not seen. When the townspeople realize they must bring Muhammad to Cruise's limo, they claim to put him inside a bear mascot outfit (though it is later revealed that Santa Claus was concealed within the suit, a plan spearheaded by Mr Hankey). The town is about to give Muhammad to the celebrities when the exchange is interrupted by a car bomb planted by the ginger kids: a group of fair-skinned, red-haired children who are tired of being made fun of for their physical appearance. The gingers want Muhammad for themselves, hoping to use his goo for their own means. They threaten to blow up the town if Muhammad is not turned over to them. The people of South Park decide to turn Muhammad over to the gingers, fearing the violence that will befall their town if they do not.

The celebrities are angered by this change in plans but refuse to resort to violence that could ruin their careers. Instead, they decide to awaken the rebuilt Mecha-Streisand, a giant mechanical monster form of Barbra Streisand, who previously terrorized the town of South Park before being destroyed. The celebrities hope to use Mecha-Streisand to force South Park to accept their demands.

Meanwhile, due to the chain of events, Cartman decides Connor's scheme has become too complicated and tries to quit, but Connor convinces him to stay involved by revealing that the townspeople of South Park have lied to him about the identity of his father: although they previously claimed his hermaphroditic mother Liane was his father, Connor insists this is a lie. Cartman confronts his school teacher, Mr. Garrison, and Garrison's old hand puppet Mr. Hat, who admits to Cartman that there was indeed a cover-up. The gingers are given Muhammad, but demand he come out of his bear outfit. Mecha-Streisand roars threateningly, setting the stage for "201".

== Production ==
We kind of came up with the idea of, like, let's take our sort of most popular moments in the show and then put them all together and write them into a new show. So basically, revisit a bunch of stuff but give the show all its own plot. Which at first sounded like quite a head-fucker.

— Trey Parker
South Park co-creator

Written and directed by series co-founder Trey Parker, "200" was rated TV-MA L in the United States. It originally aired on Comedy Central in the United States on April 14, 2010. It was the 200th episode of the series. Parker and fellow co-creator Matt Stone conceive, write and produce most South Park episodes within a week of their broadcast date in order to maintain a sense of energy and timeliness. The idea for "200", however, was conceived before the fourteenth season began in March 2010, and before any of the season fourteen episodes that preceded it were conceived. While trying to decide how to celebrate the 200th episode, Parker and Stone started reviewing the plots and controversies of previous episodes, many of which had a common thread of mocking a particular celebrity. This led to the idea of the having all the celebrities band together in a class action lawsuit against the town. Parker said their reactions mirrored the real-life reactions some of the celebrities had to their portrayals, adding, "If they could join forces, they probably would".

Stone said in writing the episode, they were determined not to produce a clip show, but to merge all of the old ideas into a new, original script. The process proved challenging for the duo because it involved incorporating many ideas, subplots and characters into a single episode. Parker and Stone included a joke about this process at the start of the episode, when Cartman and Kyle are fighting with each other, and Stan accuses them of just "rehashing a bunch of old stuff". In honor of the 200th episode, the website SouthPark200.com was launched, offering a forum to fans to post their congratulations to South Park and view those posted by others. Various people have contributed to the site, including the creators of the animated series The Simpsons (who used the opportunity to revisit another previous South Park theme, the episode "Simpsons Already Did It", saying "We already [produced 200 episodes]. Twice".), members of the rock band Rush and Denver Nuggets basketball player Chauncey Billups. The site also includes congratulations from All in the Family creator Norman Lear, who guest-starred in the 100th episode "I'm a Little Bit Country", and figure skater Brian Boitano, who was featured in the song "What Would Brian Boitano Do?" in the 1999 film South Park: Bigger, Longer & Uncut.

== Theme ==
=== Muhammad storyline ===
An image of the Muslim prophet Muhammad was shown in the 2001 episode "Super Best Friends", but was later banned from the 2006 episode "Cartoon Wars" due to controversies regarding Muhammad cartoons in European newspapers. This contradiction is mocked in "200". In 2010, the episode which relates to this picture was removed by South Park Studios and is no longer available for viewing.

"200" features jokes and references to past South Park episodes, storylines, characters and controversies. The episode revolves heavily around efforts to bring Muhammad into public view. This is based on two past controversies in 2005 (Jyllands-Posten Muhammad cartoons controversy) and 2007 (Lars Vilks Muhammad drawings controversy), when European newspapers published cartoons of Muhammad, which was responded to with reactions of violent riots, global protests and death threats toward the artists. As a result of those incidents, many publications and television studios have refused to broadcast images of Muhammad whatsoever, which was the inspiration behind the Tom Cruise character's efforts in the episode to harvest Muhammad's apparent immunity to satire and ridicule. Parker and Stone addressed the Muhammad issue in their two-part tenth season episode "Cartoon Wars", during which they attempt to show an image of the prophet, only to reveal that Comedy Central has forbidden any such image from being broadcast on their network. However, Muhammad had already been featured on-screen in the fifth season episode "Super Best Friends", in which he is among a band of religious figures modeled after the superheroes in the Super Friends cartoons from the 1970s and 1980s. (The Super Best Friends are featured once again in "200".) The episode "Super Best Friends" aired in 2001, before the Jyllands-Posten and Vilks controversies. Stan makes reference to that past use of Muhammad's image in "200" by saying of Muhammad, "I saw him once... a while ago..." This reference was purposely included to reflect the irony that an image that was previously not a problem had suddenly become an issue due to new circumstances. Stone said, "Something that was OK is now not OK, and that's just fucked up." The "Super Best Friends" episode continues to be run uncensored by Comedy Central in repeats, even though new images of Muhammad remained prohibited.

Additionally, Muhammad has long been featured as one of the many characters shown in an image of dozens of South Park residents during the show's opening credits. That image, however, has gone largely unnoticed, and thus has not drawn much controversy. When asked whether they feared retribution for mocking Muhammad, Parker said, "We'd be so hypocritical against our own thoughts, if we said, 'Okay, well let's not make fun of them because they might hurt us. Okay, we'll rip on the Catholics because they won't hurt us, but we won't rip on [Muslims] because they might hurt us.'" The Muhammad subplot in "200", like the "Cartoon Wars" episodes, advocates for free speech and speaks out against censorship, both of Muhammad's image and any subject considered taboo. "200" also demonstrates the double standard in the handling of offensive images of Muhammad and other religious figures, particularly in the scene in which Muhammad is censored altogether, but Buddhism founder Gautama Buddha is shown snorting cocaine in front of the South Park children. The extreme measures the South Park boys go to in order to conceal Muhammad, like hiding him in a windowless truck and dressing him as a mascot, demonstrate the absurdity of the fear in showing the prophet, as does the fear of retaliation that the South Park residents show after Randy draws a stick figure-like drawing of him, which is not censored.

=== Celebrities ===
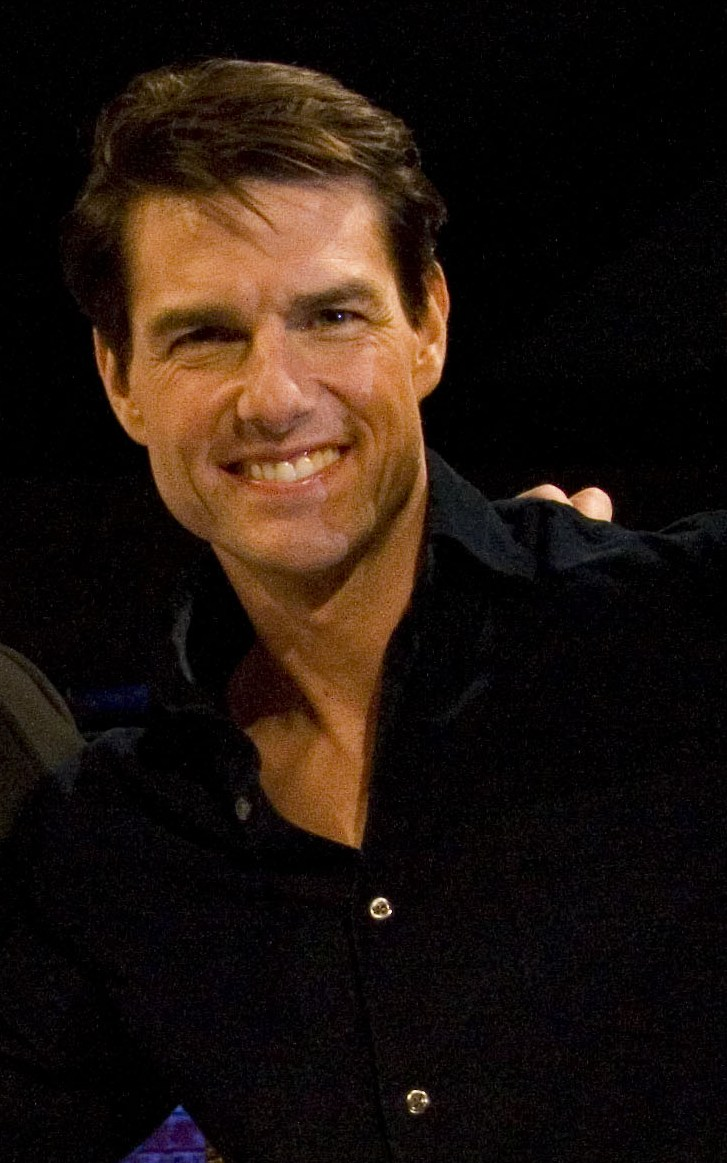
Actor Tom Cruise (pictured), who was previously parodied in the South Park episode "Trapped in the Closet", is mocked more than most of the other celebrities in "200"

"200" includes many celebrities that have been mocked in previous episodes. One of the most prominently parodied is Tom Cruise, who was the center of the ninth season episode "Trapped in the Closet". Cruise spent much of that episode hiding in a closet, a reference to rumors about his sexuality. In "200", he is found working in a fudge factory as a "fudge packer", a reference to alleged homosexuality. The episode also reveals Cruise's house consists mostly of closets, a reference to both homosexuality and the original episode in which Cruise was mocked. Other celebrities mocked in "200" include:

- Actor Ben Affleck ("How to Eat with Your Butt", "Fat Butt and Pancake Head")
- Film director Michael Bay ("Imaginationland Episode I", Cartmanland)
- Pope Benedict XVI ("Bloody Mary", "Fantastic Easter Special")
- al-Qaeda leader Osama bin Laden ("Osama bin Laden Has Farty Pants")
- Magician David Blaine ("Super Best Friends")
- Figure skater Brian Boitano ("The Spirit of Christmas: Jesus vs. Santa", "South Park: Bigger, Longer and Uncut")
- Baseball player Barry Bonds ("Up the Down Steroid")
- U2 vocalist Bono ("More Crap")
- Singer/songwriter Jimmy Buffett ("Tonsil Trouble")
- Former president Bill Clinton ("Cartman's Mom is Still a Dirty Slut", "Chinpokomon", The Red Badge of Gayness", "Sexual Healing")**
- Politician Hillary Clinton ("The Snuke")
- Lawyer Johnnie Cochran ("Chef Aid")
- Singer/songwriter Phil Collins ("Timmy 2000")
- Politician Gary Condit ("Butters' Very Own Episode")
- Comedian Bill Cosby ("Trapper Keeper", "Here Comes the Neighborhood", "Clubhouses")
- Actor Russell Crowe ("The New Terrance and Phillip Movie Trailer")
- Actor Brian Dennehy ("South Park: Bigger, Longer and Uncut")
- Catholic layman Bill Donohue ("Fantastic Easter Special")**
- Actor Michael Douglas ("Sexual Healing")
- Actor David Duchovny ("Sexual Healing")
- TV personality and medium John Edward ("The Biggest Douche in the Universe")
- Subway spokesman Jared Fogle ("Jared Has Aides")
- Director Francis Ford Coppola ("Free Hat")
- Film character Indiana Jones ("The China Probrem")
- Actor Mel Gibson ("The Passion of the Jew", "Imaginationland")
- Television host Kathie Lee Gifford ("Weight Gain 4000")
- Former vice president Al Gore ("ManBearPig", Imaginationland Episode III)
- Socialite Paris Hilton ("Stupid Spoiled Whore Video Playset")
- Wildlife expert Steve Irwin ("Hell on Earth 2006", "Prehistoric Ice Man")
- Politician Jesse Jackson ("With Apologies to Jesse Jackson")
- Singer Michael Jackson ("Dead Celebrities", "The Jeffersons")
- Actress Angelina Jolie ("Lice Capades")
- Talk show host David Letterman ("Sexual Healing")
- Film director George Lucas ("Free Hat", "The China Probrem")
- Actress Liza Minnelli ("Freak Strike")
- Disney mascot Mickey Mouse ("The Ring")
- President Barack Obama ("About Last Night...", "Margaritaville", "Sexual Healing"**
- Actress and television host Rosie O'Donnell ("Trapper Keeper")
- Actress Sarah Jessica Parker ("The Tale of Scrotie McBoogerballs")
- Actor and film director Robert Redford ("Chef's Chocolate Salty Balls")
- Actor Christopher Reeve ("Krazy Kripples")
- Film director Rob Reiner ("Butt Out")
- Actor Michael Richards ("With Apologies to Jesse Jackson")
- Actor Eric Roberts ("Cartman's Mom is Still a Dirty Slut")
- Actor Kurt Russell ("Imaginationland Episode II")
- Actress Winona Ryder (South Park: Bigger, Longer & Uncut)
- Actor and television host Bob Saget ("Cartman's Mom Is a Dirty Slut")
- Actor Fred Savage ("Chef's Chocolate Salty Balls")
- Actor and comedian Rob Schneider ("The Biggest Douche in the Universe")**
- Actor Charlie Sheen ("Sexual Healing")
- Actress Brooke Shields (South Park: Bigger, Longer & Uncut)
- Film director M. Night Shyamalan ("Imaginationland Episode I")
- Actor and retired football player O. J. Simpson ("Butters' Very Own Episode")
- Film director Steven Spielberg ("Cripple Fight", "Free Hat", "The China Probrem")
- Singer Britney Spears ("Christian Rock Hard", "Britney's New Look")
- Actor Sylvester Stallone ("Wing")
- Singer/former lead vocalist of Creed Scott Stapp ("Christian Rock Hard")**
- Singer/Songwriter Rod Stewart ("Are You There God? It's Me, Jesus")**
- Television host Martha Stewart ("Eat, Pray, Queef", "Red Hot Catholic Love")
- Actress Sally Struthers ("Starvin' Marvin", "Mecha-Streisand", "Starvin' Marvin in Space", "The Death of Eric Cartman")
- Actor Billy Bob Thornton ("Sexual Healing")
- Actor John Travolta ("The Entity", "Trapped in the Closet")
- Metallica drummer Lars Ulrich ("Christian Rock Hard")**
- Animal rights/Environmental activist Paul Watson ("Whale Whores")
- Rapper Kanye West ("Fishsticks", "The Hobbit)
- Talk show host Oprah Winfrey ("Here Comes the Neighborhood", "A Million Little Fibers")
- Golf pro Tiger Woods ("Sexual Healing")
- Singer and former actress Tina Yothers ("Pinkeye")

(**) = Celebrities who appeared in the follow up, "201"

Near the end of "200", the celebrities seek assistance from singer and actress Barbra Streisand, who resembles a giant two-legged mechanical monster. This is a reference to Streisand's appearance in the first-season episode "Mecha-Streisand", in which she transforms into a monster in the style of Mechagodzilla from the Godzilla franchise. The Mecha-Streisand featured in "200" is designed with more sophisticated computer imagery than the original, which was a simple cut-out style cartoon like the rest of South Park. Although Parker and Stone have maintained that most of the celebrities they mock in South Park are chosen at random, with no personal animosity behind it, Barbra Streisand is one of the few they actively and vehemently dislike. Streisand, in turn, has been critical of South Park and her portrayal in it, and has accused the show of adding "to the cynicism and negativity in our culture, especially in children".

Additionally, film director Tim Burton appears, despite never having been featured in an episode of South Park prior to 200.

=== Cartman's father ===
The episode ends with a cliffhanger involving Cartman's father. The identity of Cartman's father made up a major plot point at the end of the first season, culminating in the second season episode "Cartman's Mom Is Still a Dirty Slut", in which it is stated Cartman's mother, Liane Cartman, is a hermaphrodite and is Cartman's father. "200" is the first episode to return to the matter and suggest this was not the actual truth. Throughout the episode, Cartman uses a hand-puppet con-artist named Mitch Conner, who had, presumably, just been made up by Cartman in trying to fool Kyle in the seventh-season episode "Fat Butt and Pancake Head", resuming his role in pretending to be Jennifer Lopez and utilizing many offensive Hispanic stereotypes in his portrayal of her. The hand puppet portrayal is very similar to the work of Spanish ventriloquist Señor Wences.

Several other references to previous South Park episodes are featured throughout "200". It marks the reappearance of Mr. Hat, a hand puppet that had been frequently used by Mr. Garrison during the early South Park seasons, but had long been abandoned in later episodes. During the second half of "200", an army of red-haired "ginger kids" attempt to capture Muhammad themselves. Several South Park episodes, most prominently the ninth-season episode "Ginger Kids", have featured the ginger kids, which are children with fair skin, freckles and red hair. In most cases, they have been made the subject of ridicule by Cartman, who views them in an offensively stereotypical way.

== Cultural references ==
During one scene, a frustrated Tom Cruise angrily jumps up and down on a couch while Oprah Winfrey sits next to him. This is a reference to an incident on The Oprah Winfrey Show in 2005, in which Cruise repeatedly jumped on the couch next to Oprah, fell to one knee and loudly professed his love for actress Katie Holmes. Cruise has been repeatedly mocked for his behavior.

In another scene, George Lucas and Steven Spielberg are shown to have actor Harrison Ford leashed, chained and ball-gagged, as the actor wears the fedora he wore in the Indiana Jones films. This is a reference to the twelfth season episode "The China Probrem", in which Lucas and Spielberg literally rape Indiana Jones repeatedly, which served as a commentary by Parker and Stone for their opinion of the 2008 Spielberg/Lucas film, Indiana Jones and the Kingdom of the Crystal Skull.

A cartoon image of film director Tim Burton is featured in the episode, despite having not appeared in any prior episodes. In 200, Burton is mocked for not having an original idea since the 1988 comedy horror film Beetlejuice, for his tendency to feature film actor Johnny Depp in so many of his films that he should "just have sex with him [Johnny Depp] already", and his tendency to reuse the same licensed music in many of his films.

Cartman's Jennifer Lopez hand-puppet repeatedly demands food from the American restaurant chain Taco Bell, particularly enchiritos, which is one of the many Hispanic stereotypes utilized by the character.

When the celebrities are discussing whom to bring in to help capture Mohammed, Barbra Streisand is referenced as "her," to which the discussion goes "her who?" "her" "oh...her." This is slightly reminiscent of the 1986 movie Little Shop of Horrors when Rick Moranis and Steve Martin are talking about Audrey, who the dentist had physically abused, where Steve asks "what did I ever do to you?" and Rick answers "it wasn't what you did to me, it was what you did to her" Steve: "her? oh...her"

== Reception ==
=== Ratings ===
In its original American broadcast on April 14, 2010, "200" was watched by 3.33 million viewers, according to Nielsen Media Research, making it the most watched cable television show of the night. It outperformed the previous week's episode, "You Have 0 Friends", which was seen by 3.07 million viewers, and it was seen by roughly 177,000 more viewers than its closest competitor on April 14, USA Network's In Plain Sight. The episode received an overall 2.0 rating/3 share, meaning that it was seen by 2% of the population, and 3% of people watching television at the time of the broadcast. Among viewers between ages 18 and 49, it received a 1.9 rating/5 share, and among male viewers between 18 and 34, it received a 3.7 rating/13 share.

=== Reviews ===
This was South Park distilled to its essence: Cartman and his friends caught up in the stupidity all around them, created by absurd, neurotic, fearful, repressed adults. Parker and Stone set themselves apart from all this by insisting on remaining juvenile — something like genius juveniles.

— Ken Tucker
Entertainment Weekly

The episode received mostly positive reviews. Ken Tucker of Entertainment Weekly said he was surprised by the complexity of "200" and the amount of South Park references and subplots it encompassed, especially the questions over Cartman's father. Tucker praised the episode, and said, "With jokes raining down like hell-fire, the 200th episode spared no one except the South Park kids themselves." Ramsey Isler of IGN said it was fun to identify all the references to past South Park moments, but felt "200" itself didn't stand out as a great episode. Isler said the new material wasn't very funny, and that the rehashed material was not as funny as the first time they were shown, which was disappointing due to the hype surrounding the episode. The A.V. Club writer Sean O'Neal said the episode was funny, but that the original material was far outnumbered by rehashed jokes. O'Neal said the use of all the celebrities demonstrated how South Park had been more original in early episodes, but now had "morph[ed] into something whose default mode is mocking famous people in the news".

Douglas Murray of The Daily Telegraph said of the episode, "I can't recommend it enough", and particularly complimented the episode scenes with Buddha snorting cocaine and the South Park townspeople hiding Muhammad. Murray said, "They make the point about the absurd self-censorship and thuggish intimidation surrounding the Islamic faith better than anything else I've seen." Amy Duncan of Metro said it "certainly was an episode to remember". Duncan praised the story, which she said "develops with [South Park's] usual rude inferences and below-the-belt remarks". Ryan Broderick of The Hofstra Chronicle said the episode "came together so simply, so smoothly, and so hilariously that it forgives the last couple lame duck episodes of the season". Broderick said it avoided the pitfalls of most landmark episodes by providing an original story in addition to the throwback references. Nick Zaino of TV Squad said the episode did not offer much new, but also offer good throwbacks and celebrity spoofs, and didn't "pull any punches". Zaino said the episode has "a wonderful sense of the absurd", particularly through the use of Mecha-Streisand and Cartman's hand-puppet.

The Council on American-Islamic Relations, a Washington, D.C.–based civil rights and advocacy group, said they were aware of the depiction of Muhammad in "200", but declined to put out a formal statement about it because they did not want to draw any more attention to the show. The group's spokesman, Ibrahim Hooper, said, "People are pretty tired of this whole 'Let's insult the prophet Muhammad thing.'"

=== Revolution Muslim entry ===
We have to warn Matt and Trey that what they are doing is stupid and they will probably wind up like Theo van Gogh for airing this show. This is not a threat, but a warning of the reality of what will likely happen to them.

— Abu Talhah al Amrikee

The website for the organization Revolution Muslim, a New York–based organization, posted an entry that included a warning to creators Parker and Stone that they risk retribution for their depictions of Muhammad. It said that they would "probably wind up like Theo van Gogh for airing this show". Filmmaker Theo van Gogh was murdered by an Islamist in 2004 for making a short documentary on the violence against women in some Islamic societies. The posting provided the addresses to Comedy Central in New York and the production company in Los Angeles. The author of the post, Zachary Adam Chesser (who preferred to be called Abu Talhah al Amrikee), said it was meant to serve as a warning to Parker and Stone, not a threat, and that providing the addresses was meant to give people the opportunity to protest.

The entry included audio clips of a sermon by al-Qaeda imam Anwar al-Awlaki, calling for the assassination of anyone who has defamed Muhammad, saying, "Harming Allah and his messenger is a reason to encourage Muslims to kill whoever does that". It also included a link to a 2009 Huffington Post article that gave details of Stone and Parker's mansion in Colorado, and images of Ayaan Hirsi Ali, an activist writer and critic of Islam, who lives in permanent security protection because of threats. Comedy Central declined to comment on the post. Before writing the Revolution Muslim post, Chesser wrote an April 15 entry on his Twitter page: "May Allah kill Matt Stone and Trey Parker and burn them in Hell for all eternity. They insult our prophets Muhammad, Jesus, and Moses." Chesser was subsequently sentenced to 25 years of imprisonment for this and other offenses.

Despite Chesser's statements that the website entry was a warning, several media outlets and observers interpreted it as a threat. Ayaan Hirsi Ali dismissed claims that the website entry was just a warning, calling it "an assault on the freedom of expression" that should not be marginalized or overlooked. She said of the episode, "The 'South Park' episode of last weekend was not just funny, and it wasn't just witty. [It] addressed an essential piece in the times that we are living. There is one group of people, one religion[,] that is claiming to be above criticism". New York City Police Commissioner Raymond Kelly said he was aware of the website posting, but said, "We don't think that this threat, as [it] is currently assessed, rises to a crime right now".

CNN journalist Anderson Cooper said of the episode, "You might not like South Park the cartoon. You might think it's offensive. [But] the notion that some radical Islamic group in America would make a threat, even a veiled one, against two men's lives because of it is chilling." Fox News commentator Bill O'Reilly said he would have advised Parker and Stone not to do the episode out of fear of retaliation: "On the one hand you do have to admire their courage. But I don't know whether the risk–reward [ratio] is worth it." The Daily Telegraph writer Douglas Murray said the entry only gave "200" more legitimacy, writing, "[It] of course just confirms the point that the South Park boys were making. [...] I'd have said that was point proved. South Park 1: Islamists 0." In an episode of Comedy Central's The Daily Show aired on April 22, 2010, host Jon Stewart went into a ten-minute tirade about the alleged death threats, expressing disgust at the alleged hypocrisy of Revolution Muslim's speech while its members enjoy the American lifestyle and freedom of speech.

In response to the Revolution Muslim post, the South Park episode "201", which aired the following week and concluded the unresolved storylines from "200", was heavily censored by Comedy Central. The channel inserted audio bleeps over all references to Muhammad's name and other portions of dialogue, including the entirety of the ending speech by the show's main characters.

The Dutch version of Comedy Central began airing commercials for "200" during the week of April 26, with the show scheduled to air on April 30. However, "The Tale of Scrotie McBoogerballs" was shown instead. When asked about this, a spokesperson for Comedy Central Netherlands said they had reluctantly decided the episode to be pulled, along with the episode "201". Neither episode is available on the Dutch South Park Studios website; the same applies to the German website as of May 9, 2010. The Swedish affiliate of Comedy Central also refused to broadcast "200" and "201" in Sweden:

Comedy Central has decided not to air these two episodes of South Park. It is a decision we've made with great reluctance. Comedy Central believes strongly in creative freedom of expression; when unique and deeply insightful creative talents like those behind South Park are able to express themselves freely, we all benefit. However, the safety of our employees is our unquestioned number[-]one priority, and therefore we have decided to take these precautionary measures.

=== Possible link to Times Square car bomb attempt ===
On May 1, 18 days after the episode's original airdate, a failed car bomb attempt was discovered by the New York City Police Department near the eastern corner of One Astor Plaza in New York City, on West 45th Street, a side street near the location of the world headquarters of Viacom, Comedy Central's parent company. Some news outlets reported that police are looking into a possible link between the attempted bombing and the warnings of violence against Trey Parker and Matt Stone, although no such link has yet been established. Such speculation was also fueled by statements from U.S. Congressman Peter T. King, who described as one possible motive "the whole issue with 'South Park,' which Islamic terrorists were threatening to have retribution for." However, King stressed the theory was "one possibility out of a hundred". Revolution Muslim has denied any involvement with the incident. Younus Abdullah Muhammed, who runs the group's website, was in Times Square at the time speaking out against President Barack Obama with a loudspeaker. But he said of the failed car bomb, "What do you think, I commanded somebody to blow up a building in the middle of Times Square? [...] It had nothing to do with the 'South Park' controversy. It was not an attack targeting Viacom." NYPD Commissioner Raymond Kelly said of the theory, "We certainly wouldn't rule that out." However, media reports indicated Faisal Shahzad, the suspect arrested in connection with the attempted bombing, had trained for months prior to the first broadcast of "200."

=== Sri Lanka ban ===
The depiction of Buddha snorting cocaine in "200" and "201" prompted the government of Sri Lanka to ban the entire series outright.

== Digital censorship ==
The day after the episode aired, the episode was available for streaming on the site. After a week, like the other Muhammad episodes, it was taken off. The message presented to the user for this episode is "We apologize that South Park Studios cannot stream this episode". The sequel episode, "201", also has not been made available for streaming, but a different message describes an intent to potentially post that episode. Similarly, the episode and its sequel are not available to stream or buy on services Netflix, iTunes, Hulu, Paramount+, or Amazon Prime Video. Furthermore, digital copies of these episodes that were purchased prior to their ban from digital distribution are no longer available for streaming or download.

When the series was transferred to HBO Max in 2020, it was announced that "200" and "201" would be 2 of 5 episodes cut from the series, alongside "Super Best Friends", "Cartoon Wars Part I", and "Cartoon Wars Part II". The latter two episodes were not previously censored from digital streaming services. While "200" is available for purchase on Paramount+, "201" remains missing.

== Home media ==
Although "200" was not currently available on the internet legally, and had not re-aired since April 2010, it was confirmed on February 11, 2011, that "200" would be released on DVD. "200" along with the thirteen other episodes from South Park's fourteenth season, was released on a three-disc DVD set and two-disc Blu-ray set in the United States on April 26, 2011.

The version presented on the DVD and Blu-ray is the uncensored version, with Muhammad's name unbleeped, unlike the episode that follows, "201", which is presented on disc in its original network censored version. During the commentary in both "200" and "201" Parker and Stone never mention Muhammad directly, referring to him only as "the prophet of the Muslim faith". Despite the package claiming otherwise, both "200" and "201" were completely omitted from the Region 4 and Region 2 releases.
