= Fat Butt and Pancake Head =

Season 7 South Park episode

- South Park episode
- Episode no.: Season 7 Episode 5
- Directed by: Trey Parker
- Written by: Trey Parker
- Production code: 705
- Original air date: April 16, 2003

Guest appearance
- Blaine Fontana

Episode chronology
| ← Previous "I'm a Little Bit Country" | Next → "Lil' Crime Stoppers" |
- South Park season 7

"Fat Butt and Pancake Head" (also known as "Jennifer-Lopez-Mania") is the fifth episode of the seventh season and the 101st overall episode of the Comedy Central series South Park. It was originally broadcast on April 16, 2003.

In the episode, Jennifer Lopez is enraged to learn that a new Latina singer also named Jennifer Lopez (but in actuality is just Cartman's hand) has stolen her record deal and her boyfriend Ben Affleck.

== Plot ==
South Park Elementary holds a cultural diversity event in which Kyle Broflovski gives a report on the role of Latinos in American technology. A board of Latino community leaders (who are the judges) seem pleased with Kyle's report. Eric Cartman goes on stage to report on the effect of Latino culture on the arts in America. He says he has a special guest, Jennifer Lopez. However, it turns out to be a ventriloquist act with Cartman's hand acting as the head of "Ms. Lopez" (a reference to Señor Wences by way of The In-Laws) who is a Hispanic stereotype in every way. Despite the display, the judges give him first place for having the best report, and he wins a $20 gift certificate at the mall. This angers Kyle, as he thinks Cartman's speech is racist and immature, and while Kyle had spent weeks laboring over his speech, it is implied that Cartman spent very little time in preparation.

Cartman further angers Kyle by insisting that Ms. Lopez has a mind of her own. When the children go to the mall, Cartman—at the apparent behest of Ms. Lopez—pays ten dollars to record a music video at a recording store. The video gets sent to the record company, proving a success and propelling Ms. Lopez to stardom. However, the executives agree that Ms. Lopez has too many similarities to the actual Jennifer Lopez and decide to replace her with the puppet because they cannot have two Jennifer Lopezes.

When the actual Jennifer Lopez is directly told by the executives in a meeting that she is getting fired, she gets infuriated, especially after learning that she has been replaced by a puppet. Jennifer Lopez and her husband-to-be, Ben Affleck, show up at South Park Elementary in a limousine. Lopez starts to beat up Cartman's hand until he pleads that he will stop his ventriloquist act. As the two celebrities leave, Affleck catches sight of Ms. Lopez and falls in love with her. The tension between Cartman and the hand-puppet escalates as Ms. Lopez forces him to do things her way.

Affleck invites Ms. Lopez for a ride in his car. Cartman reluctantly agrees. Later Ms. Lopez lets Ben make out with her, then she performs oral sex on him. Cartman gets infuriated, and departs the car quickly. The next morning Cartman awakes to find in his bed a naked Affleck, with Ms. Lopez announcing that they had had sex all night and are getting married.

The news of the wedding again angers the actual Jennifer Lopez as she attempts to kill Ms. Lopez. Cartman runs. On a bridge, Jennifer Lopez, the police, Ben Affleck, the people from the recording company, Kyle, Kenny and Stan catch up with Cartman. After they argue, Ms. Lopez screams for everyone to be quiet. Cartman removes her hair and Ms. Lopez, in a male voice, makes the confession that his real name is Mitch Conner, a con man who has been moving around from town to town. Conner apologizes to Ben for playing with his heart and states that he will die because he has recently consumed a cyanide pill. Conner then dies (Cartman makes it look like he flutters away into the wind), and everyone goes away except for the boys.

Kyle then asks Cartman to explain Mitch Conner. Cartman says, "Look, I don't care what you guys believe. But with all the crazy stuff that goes on in this town, isn't it possible, just possible, that something I don't understand happened here?" When Kyle admits that it's possible, Cartman starts singing, much to Kyle's dismay. The episode ends with Jennifer Lopez working at a taco restaurant while on probation. She complains she had six platinum records and starred in five Hollywood movies. The Mexican worker next to her responds, "Yeah, me too."

== Production ==
The episode stemmed from two ideas; during a writer's retreat they had the idea to give Cartman a hand puppet, the final product of which was inspired from a Spanish puppeteer. The pair also wanted to make an episode making fun of Jennifer Lopez and Ben Affleck. The latter part of the title refers to Affleck's perceived "flat head" according to Parker and Stone.

== Legacy ==
- Cartman's ventriloquist act of Mitch Conner/Jennifer Lopez returned in the season 14 episodes "200" and "201". It also returned in the video game South Park: The Fractured but Whole, with both Cartman and later Kyle in control of Mitch Connor. It is revealed here that Cartman is, in fact, in total control of Mitch.
- In the commentary, Trey Parker has stated that this episode has his favorite ending because it is so surreal and "you don't even know if Cartman is lying or not".
- In South Park's season 7 commentary, Parker recalls that five months after the episode aired, he "heard from some friends that were on a set of a Jennifer Lopez movie she was doing and they said that when she would walk by, some of the lower people like the PAs would say, 'Oooh tacos, I love tacos…'. And that she got so mad and had to fire people… But she kept hearing it in the distance".
