= Jared Has Aides =

- South Park episode
- Episode no.: Season 6 Episode 1
- Directed by: Trey Parker
- Written by: Trey Parker
- Production code: 602
- Original air date: March 6, 2002

Episode chronology
| ← Previous "Butters' Very Own Episode" | Next → "Asspen" |
- South Park season 6

"Jared Has Aides" is the first episode of the sixth season of the adult American animated television series South Park, and the 80th episode of the series overall. It first aired on Comedy Central in the United States on March 6, 2002. In the episode, weight loss advocate and Subway spokesman Jared Fogle incurs the wrath of South Park after he announces that he lost weight because he has aides (misinterpreted as AIDS). This leads Cartman, Kyle and Stan to try to use Butters as their own advocate for City Wok. The episode also parodies the film Philadelphia.

"Jared Has Aides" was written and directed by series co-creator Trey Parker. The episode, which satirizes since-disgraced Fogle, was inspired after Parker saw several commercials featuring Fogle on television.

== Plot ==
Jared Fogle gives a speech at South Park, touting how easy it is to lose weight by simply eating a diet of Subway sandwiches. Cartman, Kyle, Stan and Butters visit Jared, and are dismayed when Jared reveals that his weight loss is not only the result of eating sandwiches, but also with the help from his aides (a personal trainer and a dietician). Kyle convinces Jared that he is being dishonest by never referring to his assistants, and Jared realizes the boys are correct, and plans to give another speech to discuss them. At Jared's next announcement, he raves about his aides. The townspeople misconstrue the statement, thinking that he is infected with AIDS, and become repulsed by him. After being fired by Subway, Jared begins to wish he never hired aides. His assistants convince him that people are upset because they cannot hire their own assistants, inspiring Jared to start the "Aides for Everyone" (misinterpreted as "AIDS for Everyone") foundation. The townspeople are angered further, and chase him through town. Jared laments that everyone hates him for saying he has AIDS while he beats a dead horse with a baseball bat. When Jared is caught, the mob prepares to lynch him; however, Stan and the boys intervene, and clarify that Jared was not referring to AIDS, but his assistants. The townspeople apologize, and begin laughing at their mistake. Everyone declares AIDS is finally humorous, and begin celebrating as a banner, with "AIDS is Finally Funny" inscribed on it, is unveiled.

In a subplot, Cartman devises a scheme to earn money after discovering that Jared did not have to eat sandwiches to lose weight. He proposes that Butters gain much weight and then become fit by other means, while pretending that he lost weight by eating at City Wok. After striking a deal with the manager of the restaurant to film several commercials, Butters manages to gain the weight, but finds himself unable to lose it, and the boys resort to liposuction. As they perform the operation, Butters' parents return home, and ground him for performing surgery in the house. When it is time to film the commercials, Butters states he is grounded and will not leave; however, the boys manage to convince him to come as Cartman stays behind at Butters' house to cover for him. Butters' parents call the house, with Cartman replying to them each time with crude language. Meanwhile, when Stan discovers City Wok's owner will only pay them 15 dollars, he severs the deal, and Butters returns home as he thanks Cartman for covering him. Just before Butters' parents arrive, Cartman brings over a lawn chair, a drink, and a bucket of popcorn, then sits outside and watches as Butters' parents ruthlessly beat him for the language that Cartman, pretending to be Butters, used on the phone.

== Production ==
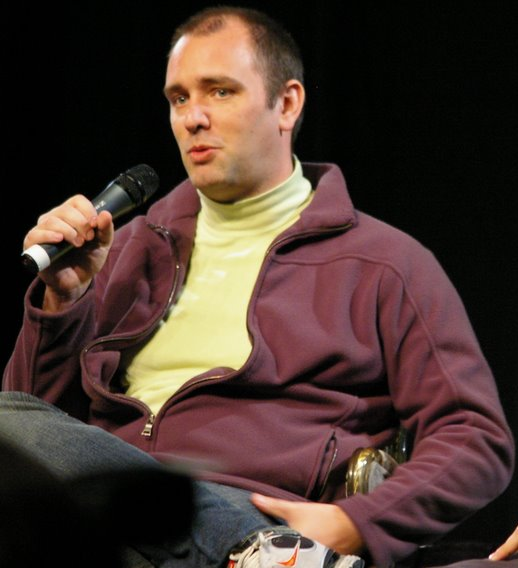
Series co-creator Trey Parker wrote and directed "Jared Has Aides"

"Jared Has Aides" was written and directed by series co-creator Trey Parker. The episode, which heavily satirizes at the time Subway spokesman and weight loss advocate Jared Fogle, was inspired by the fact that Parker and Stone had seen several Subway commercials featuring Fogle; as Parker said, "there was a Jared commercial on all the damn time, and it was getting pretty out of hand." The subplot from the episode, featuring Butters faking losing weight to strike a deal to film commercials with City Wok, was inspired by Parker and Stone wondering if Fogle lost weight by eating a diet consisting entirely of Subway sandwiches, with Stone saying on the commentary that "I could go gain 20 pounds, and then eat nothing but McDonald's. I just wouldn't eat very much McDonald's." The character of Jared Fogle would later return in the fourteenth season episode "200", as one of several celebrities who returned to South Park for justice, a cameo in the season nineteen premiere "Stunning and Brave" and was featured as a boss in the video game, South Park: The Fractured but Whole, the latter two occurring after his conviction for possessing child pornography in 2015.

The episode features the first appearance of the restaurant City Wok and its manager, who would later become a recurring character. Parker and Stone were inspired to include a parody of the restaurant in South Park while working on their film Orgazmo. They wanted Chinese food, so they ordered from City Wok. The person answering the phone said, with an Asian accent, "City Wok", which Parker and Stone heard as "Shitty Wok". They began laughing, and would call the restaurant several times just to hear the person say "shitty".

"Jared Has Aides" was originally titled "Subway Sandwiches Gave Jared AIDS". However, while working on the episode, the Comedy Central advertising department contacted Parker, saying that they were not allowed to use the word "Subway" disparagingly in the episode, as Stone said, "We're like, 'Come on, you know they're trying to sell food by telling you you're going to be thin, and it's just terrible.' 'But Subway is one of our biggest sponsors, so you can't do it.' That is censorship. It absolutely is. It's just economic." However, Parker decided to "just [do] it anyway." As such, the episode was finished "at the last minute," in order to avoid network oversight. The finished episode aired with numerous references to the Subway restaurant and brand.

== Reception ==
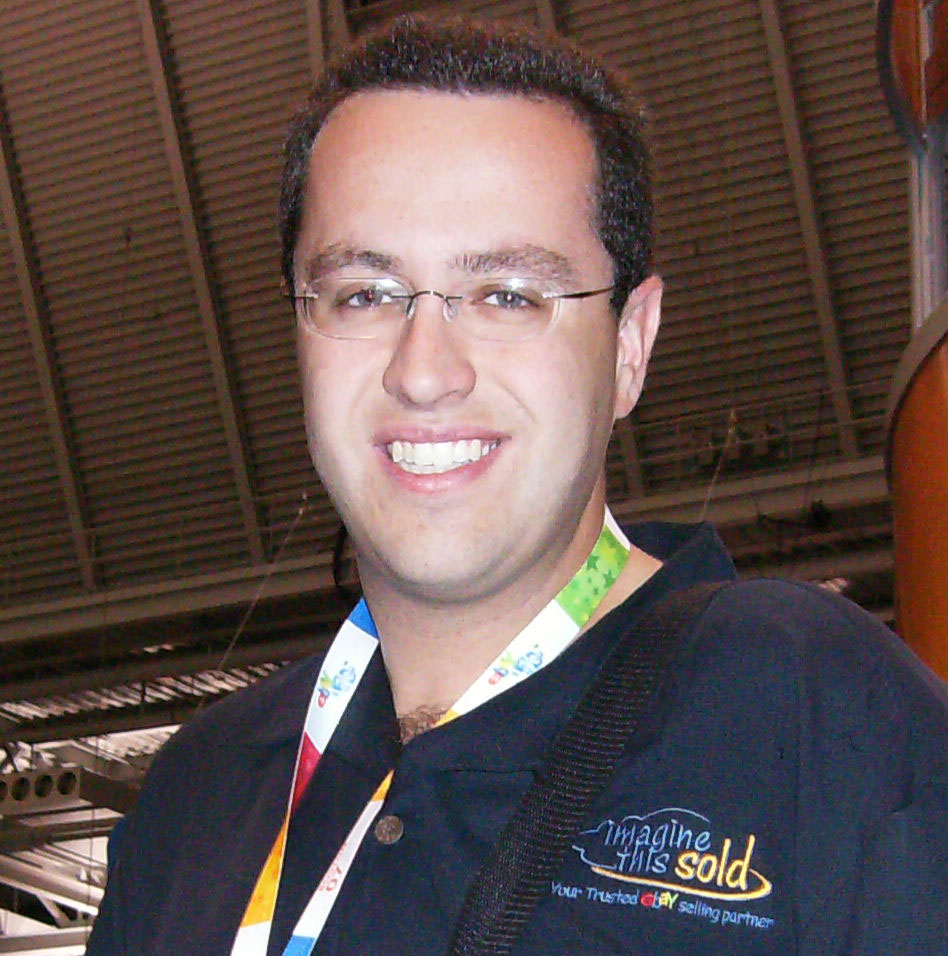
Jared Fogle called the fact that an episode was devoted to him "very flattering".

"Jared Has Aides" has received positive reviews. DigitallyObsessed called "Jared Has Aides" a "standout" of the sixth season. Amber Conrad of InsideCRM included "Jared Has Aides" in her list of "25 Things I Learned About Business From South Park," saying that "basically, the lesson here is that sometimes you have to do uncomfortable things like stuff yourself with food then starve yourself to get money. But it's still money." Jared Fogle indicated he had no problems with the episode in a 2003 interview with The Washington Post; although saying it had "typical[ly] tasteless humor", he called the fact that an entire episode was devoted to him "very flattering" and said "you know you've made it when shows like South Park start parodying you."

Since Jared Fogle's arrest and conviction for child sex tourism and possession of child pornography in 2015, the episode, which is otherwise described as "not particularly memorable", is regularly ranked among the most controversial and most dated South Park episodes.

== Home media ==
"Jared Has Aides", along with the sixteen other episodes from South Park: the Complete Sixth Season, were released on a three-disc DVD set in the United States on October 11, 2005. The sets included brief audio commentaries by Parker and Stone for each episode. IGN gave the season a rating of 9/10.
