= South Park season 14 =

Season of television series

South Park
- Season 14
- Home media release cover
- No. of episodes: 14

Release
- Original network: Comedy Central
- Original release: March 17 – November 17, 2010

Season chronology
- ← Previous; Season 13 Next → Season 15

The fourteenth season of the American animated television series South Park began airing in the United States on Comedy Central between March 17, 2010, and November 17, 2010. The season was headed by the series creators Trey Parker and Matt Stone, who served as executive producers along with Anne Garefino. The season continued to focus on the exploits of protagonists Stan, Kyle, Cartman, Kenny, and Butters in the fictional Colorado mountain town of South Park.

The season was the second of three new seasons Parker and Stone agreed to produce for the network under a renewal deal by Comedy Central. It consisted of fourteen 22-minute episodes, which aired in two groups of seven episodes separated by a six-month gap. Continuing their practice from previous seasons, Parker and Stone wrote and produced each episode within the week before its broadcast date. Parker was the director and writer for all episodes in the fourteenth season.

The season lampooned various topics, including the legalization of medical marijuana and the Deepwater Horizon oil spill. The season also parodied various cultural touchstones, such as The Catcher in the Rye, Tron, Facebook, Jersey Shore, Hoarders, and Inception. The parody of celebrities, a South Park tradition, continued in the fourteenth season, with depictions of Tiger Woods, Kim, Kourtney and Khloé Kardashian, Sarah Jessica Parker, and the devotion of the entire episodes of "200" and "201" to past celebrities suing the town of South Park for defamation. The original broadcasts of "200" and "201" were altered to censor depictions of the Islamic prophet Muhammad, to protect from threats delivered by radical Islamic extremists, which resulted in strong criticism against Comedy Central.

The fourteenth season received mixed to positive reviews, with some reviewers deeming it as an important season in the series' history, and others regarding it as progressively weak and stale. The season maintained the average Nielsen rating viewership for the series, around 3 million viewers per episode, with a slight decline in the latter half of the season. The episodes "200" and "201" were nominated for the 2010 Emmy Award for Outstanding Animated Program (for Programming Less Than One Hour).

== Blackwater spoof ==
To promote the new season, the show aired commercials showing Cartman attempting to purchase 500 AK-47s. The commercial aired after it was revealed that members of the "private security firm Blackwater had diverted hundreds of AK-47s and pistols from a U.S. weapons bunker in Afghanistan to Afghan policemen. Whoever signed for the weapons from Blackwater did so under a fake name: Eric Cartman."

During an interview with the Huffington Post, Trey Parker said: "It makes perfect sense. It's the name I would use. Our first reaction to any story is 'How do we put this into the show?' and the second reaction is 'Did Cartman do that?' because he's so real to us it's like 'I bet Cartman did that.'" Matt Stone agreed, saying "I saw that and thought, 'Wow, Cartman did that? That's pretty cool. Sounds like something he would do.'"

== Episodes ==
| No. overall | No. in season | Title | Directed by | Written by | Original release date | Prod. code | U.S. viewers (millions) |
|---|---|---|---|---|---|---|---|
| 196 | 1 | "Sexual Healing" | Trey Parker | Trey Parker | March 17, 2010 | 1401 | 3.74 |
The new Tiger Woods video game resembles a fighting game more than a golf simulation, and Cartman and Stan become big fans of the game. Kyle and Butters are diagnosed as sex addicts.
| 197 | 2 | "The Tale of Scrotie McBoogerballs" | Trey Parker | Trey Parker | March 24, 2010 | 1402 | 3.24 |
The boys write their own novel with the intention of making it the most profane and controversial book ever and pin the blame on Butters when anyone who reads the book starts vomiting.
| 198 | 3 | "Medicinal Fried Chicken" | Trey Parker | Trey Parker | March 31, 2010 | 1403 | 2.99 |
New state laws result in the closure of all KFC stores in Colorado, much to the dismay of Cartman, who takes over a cartel to get his fix. Randy Marsh attempts to give himself cancer to get a doctor's referral for medicinal marijuana.
| 199 | 4 | "You Have 0 Friends" | Trey Parker | Trey Parker | April 7, 2010 | 1404 | 3.07 |
Kyle adds a third-grader named Kip as a friend on Facebook, but Kyle's current friends erase themselves from being Kyle's friends. Meanwhile, Stan has a Facebook account created for him against his wishes.
| 200 | 5 | "200" | Trey Parker | Trey Parker | April 14, 2010 | 1405 | 3.33 |
Part one of two. Stan accidentally insults Tom Cruise again by calling him a "fudge packer" during a field trip. Cruise then recruits 200 other celebrities that have been ridiculed by the town of South Park to bring a class action lawsuit against the town.
| 201 | 6 | "201" | Trey Parker | Trey Parker | April 21, 2010 | 1406 | 3.50 |
Conclusion. South Park has Muhammad become the pawn in the game to save the town.
| 202 | 7 | "Crippled Summer" | Trey Parker | Trey Parker | April 28, 2010 | 1407 | 3.55 |
The kids stage an intervention for Towelie. As Timmy and Jimmy are attending the camp for the summer, Nathan plots to kill Jimmy but his attempts backfire due to his dim-witted associate, Mimsy, causing havoc and issues.
| 203 | 8 | "Poor and Stupid" | Trey Parker | Trey Parker | October 6, 2010 | 1408 | 3.14 |
Cartman tries to become poor and stupid so he can live his dream as a NASCAR driver, with Butters' help and angering Kenny.
| 204 | 9 | "It's a Jersey Thing" | Trey Parker | Trey Parker | October 13, 2010 | 1409 | 3.25 |
The town begins a war against New Jersey because obnoxious New Jersey residents visit and annoy the South Park residents. Meanwhile, Kyle is unable to control his actions because Sheila reveals that she is from New Jersey and Cartman criticizes him.
| 205 | 10 | "Insheeption" | Trey Parker | Trey Parker | October 20, 2010 | 1410 | 2.89 |
Stan and Mr. Mackey suffer from compulsive hoarding, and a group of experts try to find out the reasons for this, which leads to Stan getting trapped in Mr. Mackey's dream.
| 206 | 11 | "Coon 2: Hindsight" | Trey Parker | Trey Parker | October 27, 2010 | 1411 | 2.76 |
A three-part episode. Part one of three. The Coon leads an entire team of crime-fighters but Cartman is intent on taking all the glory. Cartman eventually decides to get Captain Hindsight to join them in order to regain what he believes to be their "former glory".
| 207 | 12 | "Mysterion Rises" | Trey Parker | Trey Parker | November 3, 2010 | 1412 | 2.85 |
Part two of three. Led by Mysterion, Coon and Friends are working together to help the people in the Gulf who are at the mercy of the dark lord, Cthulhu. The Coon, scorned by his fellow super heroes and now working alone, is out for revenge.
| 208 | 13 | "Coon vs. Coon and Friends" | Trey Parker | Trey Parker | November 10, 2010 | 1413 | 2.79 |
Conclusion. Part three of three. Coon and Friends find themselves at the mercy of Cartman who now has the dark lord, Cthulhu, doing his bidding. Kenny wrestles with the curse of his super power through his alter ego, Mysterion.
| 209 | 14 | "Crème Fraîche" | Trey Parker | Trey Parker | November 17, 2010 | 1414 | 2.49 |
Randy becomes obsessed with food thanks to the Food Network and his family suffers negative consequences. Meanwhile, Sharon orders a Shake Weight, and the boys try to stop Randy and a slew of celebrity chefs from overrunning the cafeteria.

== Reception ==
=== Reviews ===
Season fourteen of South Park had some tremendous ups and downs, but it also had the greatest controversy and greatest challenges the showrunners have ever faced. [...] It is often said that South Park is more than just a TV show – it's an American cultural phenomenon. No season illustrates that more than this one.

— Ramsley Isler, IGN

Ramsey Isler of IGN cited the fourteenth season as an important season, writing that the quality of the episodes are signs that "the future of the series is far from bleak." In a section describing the impact of "200" and "201", Isler asserted that, for a time, "South Park became more than just a cartoon with foul-mouthed kids – it became a symbol of the kind of terrorism and fear that have become so prevalent in today's world." He believed that the heavy-handed censorship brought the series to the forefront of social conversation for a while, but also seemed to have killed some of the enthusiasm during the season's second half. He named the "Coon" three-parter as a highlight, admitting, "The arc wasn't exactly the most hilarious stuff the show has ever produced, but it did have some brilliant ideas that were executed very well."

Many other reviewers found the show dipped in consistency during its fourteen season. Slant's Kris King gave the season a very mixed review, attributing it to the show's "forced social commentary," lamenting, "At what point did the creators of South Park stop being the sharp voices of a younger generation and start sounding like ornery parents?" Another Slant reviewer, Chris Cabin, commented that "the amount of laughs overall has negligibly diminished [...] the show's durability isn't exactly what it used to be." He believed that the fourteenth season stood as a strong display of the technical advancements the show has undergone since its premiere.

=== Ratings ===
The fourteenth season of South Park generally maintained the average Nielsen rating viewership for the series, around 3 million viewers per episode, with a slight drop-off in the second half of the season. The season premiere, "Sexual Healing", was seen in 3.74 million households, the largest audience for South Park since the third season premiere "Rainforest Shmainforest" in 1999. "Sexual Healing" proved to be the most-watched episode of the season, and the night of its premiere heralded the highest ratings of the entire year for Comedy Central. The two-part episode "200" and "201" also received high ratings (at 3.33 and 3:50 million viewers, respectively), perhaps due in part to their high controversy. "Crippled Summer", the follow-up episode, featured the second-highest ratings of the season, at 3.55 million viewers. When the series returned for the second half of season fourteen in the fall, "It's a Jersey Thing" received the highest ratings, at 3.25 million viewers.

The fourteenth season of South Park received its lowest viewership in the episodes "Crème Fraiche", seen in 2.49 million households; "Coon 2: Hindsight", seen in 2.76 million households; and "Coon vs. Coon and Friends", seen in 2.79 million households. The ratings of "Crippled Summer" outperformed those of several primetime network shows the evening of its original broadcast.

=== Controversy ===
An image of the Muslim prophet Muhammad was shown in the 2001 episode "Super Best Friends", but was later banned from the 2006 episode "Cartoon Wars" due to controversies regarding Muhammad cartoons in European newspapers. This contradiction is mocked in the season fourteen episodes "200" and "201".

"200" and "201" celebrate the series' arrival at two hundred episodes, and, as a result feature a heavy degree of reference to past South Park episodes, storylines, characters and controversies. The episodes attempt to feature a depiction of Muhammed, which Parker and Stone attempted to feature in the season ten (2006) two-parter "Cartoon Wars", but were censored. Shortly after "200"'s original broadcast, the website for the organization Revolution Muslim, a New York-based radical Muslim organization, posted an entry that included a warning to Parker and Stone that they risk violent retribution for their depictions of Muhammad. It said that they "will probably wind up like Theo van Gogh for airing this show." Filmmaker Theo van Gogh was murdered by an Islamic extremist in 2004 for making a short documentary on violence against women in some Islamic societies. The posting provided the addresses to Comedy Central in New York and the production company in Los Angeles. Posted by Zachary Adam Chesser (who preferred to be called Abu Talhah al Amrikee), several media outlets and observers interpreted it as a threat.

The following week, "201" faced a heavy degree of publicity. Before "201" aired, the New York City Police Department increased security at the Comedy Central headquarters in direct response to the threats. Law enforcement officials said Revolution Muslim itself was "all talk" and had never engaged in any actual violence but they were concerned that the website post could inspire violence from others. During the episode's first and only broadcast, all references to Muhammad's name were replaced by audio bleeps. Several other portions of dialogue were also censored, including almost the entirety of a monologue spoken by Kyle at the end regarding the moral of the episode (reportedly about "intimidation and fear.") Muhammad's name appeared in the previous episode, "200", without any such censorship. Both episodes obscured all images of what was apparently Muhammad with a black "CENSORED" box. Immediately after the episode "201" aired, the series website South Park Studios posted a notice that said Comedy Central had inserted "numerous additional bleeps throughout the episode" after Parker and Stone submitted their final cut to the network. The network later confirmed they were responsible for the audio censorship, as well as obscuring images of Muhammad. "201" has not aired since its original debut as South Park would usually repeat during the week, and episodes from earlier in the season were shown instead. Although South Park Studios generally makes unexpurgated versions of their episodes immediately available to view, the notice indicated Parker and Stone did not have network approval to show their original version, and thus no version of "201" could be seen on the website. The Canadian Comedy Network aired "201" on April 25, 2010, though the episode was censored as the American broadcast was, breaking the network's multi-year practice of airing South Park completely uncensored. In addition, "200" and "201" were not broadcast in the Netherlands, or Sweden.

The censorship of "201" brought strong criticism to Comedy Central. Some commentators suggested because Comedy Central responded to Revolution Muslim's warnings by censoring depictions of Muhammad, the Muslim extremists scored a significant public victory. As a result of Revolution Muslim's statement, Seattle cartoonist Molly Norris suggested that many people draw and publish pictures of Muhammad on May 20, 2010, which she dubbed Everybody Draw Mohammed Day, which also resulted in major criticism and controversy. Chesser was arrested in July 2010 after attempting to board a flight to Somalia to join terrorist organization Al-Shabaab, and, in October, was sentenced to 25 years in prison for communicating threats to Parker and Stone, soliciting violent jihadists to desensitize law enforcement, and attempting to provide material support to a designated foreign terrorist organization.

On January 31, 2014, the original uncensored version of "201" was illegally leaked online without the approval of Comedy Central. The speech at the end was, appropriately, a deadpan statement that making threats is an effective way to get what you want; essentially "terrorism works."

== Dutch spinoff prank ==
In February 2010, it was announced that Comedy Central Netherlands would begin airing a live-action spin-off of the show called The Real South Park in April 2010. The show was said to feature a cast of Dutch children reprising the roles of Stan, Kyle, Cartman and Kenny, with American actors providing English voice-overs. However, this turned out to be an elaborate April Fools' Day joke, with a Dutch television magazine reporting on the filming of the series in Amsterdam being in on the joke. Broadcast on April 1, it showed a short skit of the four boys traveling to Amsterdam and visiting the red-light district, ending with Kenny being hit and killed by a passing tram. The texts "1 april" and "there is only one real South Park" then appeared on screen, after which the first episode of season 14 started.

== Award nominations ==
Episodes "200" and "201", from season fourteen were nominated for the Primetime Emmy Award for Outstanding Animated Program in 2010, but lost to the ABC animated Christmas special, Prep & Landing.

== Home media ==
Season fourteen was released by Paramount Home Entertainment in the United States on April 26, 2011, on both DVD (as a three-disc set) and Blu-ray (as a two-disc set). Each set includes all fourteen episodes in 1080p video and Dolby TrueHD, as well as brief audio commentaries by Parker and Stone for each episode. The set also includes the season thirteen episode "The Coon", as a special "bonus episode".

While twelve of the episodes are uncensored, episode "200" has the image of Muhammad censored, and the controversial episode "201" is shown in its original broadcast version, preceded by a disclaimer including a statement released by Trey Parker and Matt Stone on April 22, 2010. During the commentary in both "200" and "201" Parker and Stone never mention Muhammad directly, referring to him only as "the prophet of the Muslim faith". Despite the package claiming otherwise, both "200" and "201" were omitted from the Region 4 release and have been completely omitted from the Region 2 release as well.

== See also ==
- South Park (Park County, Colorado)
- South Park City
