= Sexual Healing (South Park) =

- South Park episode
- Episode no.: Season 14; Episode 1
- Directed by: Trey Parker
- Written by: Trey Parker
- Production code: 1401
- Original air date: March 17, 2010

Episode chronology
← Previous "Pee"	Next → "The Tale of Scrotie McBoogerballs"
- South Park season 14

"Sexual Healing" is the fourteenth season premiere of the American animated television series South Park, and the 196th overall episode of the series. It originally aired on Comedy Central in the United States on March 17, 2010. The title of the episode is derived from the song of the same name by soul singer Marvin Gaye. In the episode, the sex scandal of golf pro Tiger Woods has the media and public frantic to determine why rich and successful men would suddenly crave sex with multiple partners. Meanwhile, schools are screened for the condition and Kyle, Kenny, and Butters are diagnosed with sexual addiction.

Written and directed by series co-creator Trey Parker, it was rated TV-MA L in the United States. "Sexual Healing" parodies several elements of the Woods scandal, including alleged fights with his wife Elin Nordegren, which are portrayed as part of a new Tiger Woods PGA Tour video game played by Cartman, Stan, and Kenny. In addition to mocking Woods himself, the script parodied the large amount of media attention surrounding the scandal, and suggested because it is natural for men to crave sex, Woods's actions can be understood, although not condoned.

The episode parodies several celebrities who have experienced real-life sexual scandals, including Bill Clinton, David Letterman, Charlie Sheen, David Duchovny and Ben Roethlisberger. The treatment these celebrities received is portrayed as ineffective and ridiculous, suggesting celebrities should not have to undergo insincere acts of public apology for their sexual transgressions. "Sexual Healing" received generally mixed reviews from critics.

According to Nielsen Media Research, "Sexual Healing" was seen by 3.7 million households, making it the most-watched South Park premiere since "Rainforest Shmainforest" in 1999, and helping make March 17 the most-watched night of the year for Comedy Central to that point. Shortly after the episode aired, Internet rumors spread that EA Sports planned to sue South Park creators Parker and Matt Stone over their portrayal in the episode. EA Sports specifically denied the claims.

== Plot ==
The new edition of the Tiger Woods PGA Tour series of video games incorporates elements of the alleged physical altercations Woods had with his wife regarding his extramarital affairs, and resembles a fighting game more than a golf simulation. Cartman, Stan, Kyle and Kenny become big fans of the game. Meanwhile, scientists at the Centers for Disease Control determine that sex addiction is a disease reaching epidemic proportions. They decide to screen schoolchildren for the disease, and Kenny, Kyle, and Butters are diagnosed as sex addicts. Kenny is killed after attempting autoerotic asphyxiation while in a Batman suit, while Kyle and Butters are sent to attend a therapy session for sex addicts consisting of Michael Douglas, Michael Jordan, Ben Roethlisberger, David Duchovny, Charlie Sheen, David Letterman, Bill Clinton, Billy Bob Thornton, Kobe Bryant, Eliot Spitzer, and Tiger Woods.

When performing an experiment on chimpanzees, the CDC determines that money is somehow responsible for infecting males with sexual addiction. Because an image of Independence Hall appears on the back of a $100 bill, they believe the origins of the disorder can somehow be traced there. They submit their findings to President Barack Obama, who believes that a virus for sex addiction had previously been brought to Earth by extraterrestrials. He accompanies a SWAT team on their raid on Independence Hall in search of the "wizard alien" that is responsible for the sex addiction epidemic. When one member of the team suggests that the mission is irrational and that sex addiction is simply an inherent part of the male ego, he is ordered by Obama to be hauled away.

Because Kyle also feels sex addiction is not a disease, but rather a natural male desire that can be kept under control with the proper discipline, others suggest he is somehow immune from the "spell" of the wizard alien. He is brought to Independence Hall along with Butters and both are given rifles by the SWAT team. The hauled-off SWAT member, gagged and bound in an alien wizard costume, stumbles into the room. On orders from the SWAT team, Kyle and Butters shoot the costumed officer dead and the "spell" is suddenly lifted. Woods announces he is cured of his sex addiction, and the next incarnation of his video game once again focuses on golf. Cartman and Stan reject the new game, with Stan proclaiming that "golf is stupid again."

== Production and themes ==
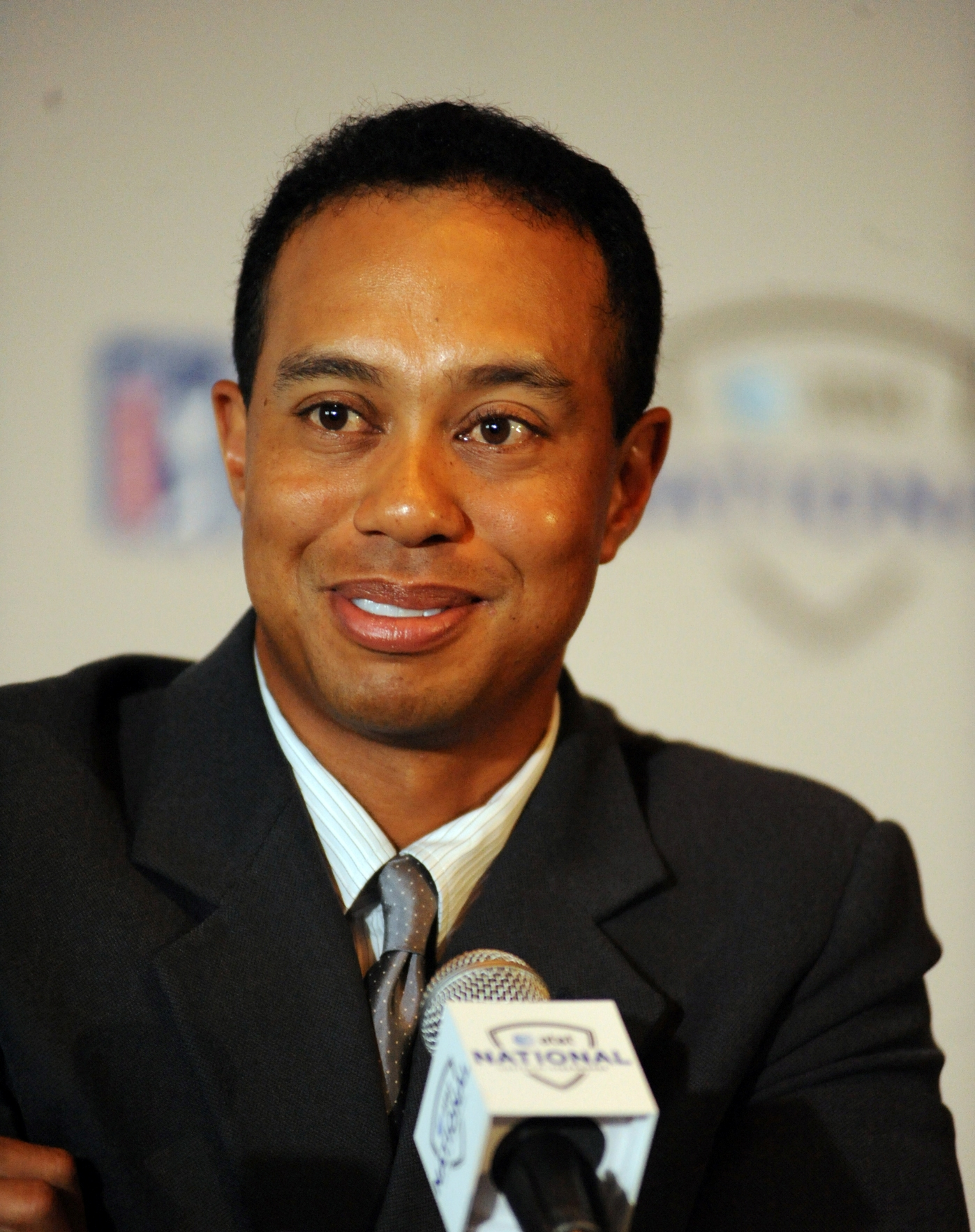
"Sexual Healing" parodied the sex scandal surrounding golf pro Tiger Woods and satirized the media attention it generated

"Sexual Healing", the South Park fourteenth season premiere, was written and directed by series co-founder Trey Parker and was rated TV-MA-L in the United States. It originally aired on Comedy Central in the United States on March 17, 2010, and in the United Kingdom on March 19. A teaser clip of the episode called "All the Temptations" featuring a parody of Woods's February 2010 televised public apology was featured on the official South Park website, South Park Studios, and drew 62,000 viewers on the first day. Before the episode aired, several news outlets incorrectly reported the episode's title was "All the Temptations" due to the clip.

The episode satirized the sex scandal surrounding golf pro Tiger Woods, who had admitted to cheating on his wife Elin Nordegren with multiple partners. The Woods scandal had been one of the biggest media stories in the months since South Park's thirteenth season ended in November 2009. Series co-creator Matt Stone said the scandal provided so much material for satire that an entire season could have been dedicated to it, and the media storm surrounding Woods meant they had even less to worry about the delicacy of their parody. Stone said he was simultaneously fascinated and disgusted by Woods's public apology, so the writers were sure to include it in the episode. The script to "Sexual Healing" was not finished until after March 12, five days before the episode aired. This was in keeping with a continued practice from previous South Park seasons, in which Parker and Stone write and produce their episodes within the week before their broadcast dates in order to harness energy for the final product and keep the material fresh. In an early image of the episode released to the press, Woods is seen at his apology press conference, with Cartman standing beside him. During the production of the episode, the writers decided to incorporate the Tiger Woods scenes as part of the video game that the boys, including Cartman, are playing.

"Sexual Healing" parodied several real-life elements of the scandal, including Nordegren's discovery of Woods's infidelity by reading text messages on his cellular phone, and Woods's loss of commercial endorsements as a result of his infidelity. The episode also parodies the alleged fight that was reported between Woods and Nordegren on Thanksgiving in which Nordegren attacked Woods's car with a golf club and caused him to crash into a fire hydrant. "Sexual Healing" also included a version of the public apology Woods delivered in February 2010, which was closely covered and examined by the mainstream media. The episode aired only a few days after Woods publicly announced he would return to golf at the 2010 Masters Tournament in April.

The fact that it is a pretty smart show, the fact it is a popular show, and the fact it is a hip show means they can go pretty far with some of their subjects and not worry about getting sued. ... With Tiger Woods there's even more leeway. They can go even further because it's such a bizarre story. It's not one adulterous affair, it's a dozen. And it's not just any celebrity, it's this demigod, Tiger Woods.

— Syracuse University Professor
Robert Thompson

The shock and confusion with which the male characters in "Sexual Healing" react to the Woods scandal, and the extreme measures they undertake to learn why rich and successful men crave sex, served as a parody to the wide media attention and analysis the scandal received. The episode puts forward a pragmatic explanation that it is natural for men to crave sex, so although Woods's actions cannot be condoned, they can at least be understood for what they are. This point of view particularly conveyed in the speech of one SWAT team member near the end of the episode, who is ostracized, imprisoned and unknowingly shot to death by Kyle and Butters after expressing his common sense views. The episode suggests men of normal financial means would likely be tempted by infidelity and sexual affairs if they had enough fame and money to obtain them easily.

"Sexual Healing" suggests celebrities involved in sexual scandals should not be forced to undergo rehabilitation and public acts of contrition. The scene in which the celebrities start shaking and dancing, proclaiming "Look, the sex addiction is leaving my body!", demonstrates the insincerity and ridiculousness of these public steps. The episode also mocked the measures used to diagnose and treat sexual addiction in the United States. This is particularly prevalent when Kenny, Kyle and Butters are misdiagnosed with sexual addiction based on an inaccurate test of simply presenting an image of a naked woman to them and testing whether they could identify a handkerchief in the woman's hand and specify its color. The rehabilitation courses themselves are also mocked as ineffective and unnecessary, particularly because the most important lesson taught in them is how to avoid getting caught.

== Current affairs references ==
Several celebrities who had experienced well publicized sexual scandals or affairs were featured in a sexual addiction rehabilitation class "Sexual Healing". Among them were former U.S. President Bill Clinton, night talk show host David Letterman, NFL quarterback Ben Roethlisberger, former New York governor Eliot Spitzer, basketball players Michael Jordan and Kobe Bryant, and actors Charlie Sheen, David Duchovny, Michael Douglas and Billy Bob Thornton. While discussing how to avoid getting caught, Roethlisberger says, "Don't screw girls in the public bathrooms", a reference to his March 2010 sex scandal in Milledgeville, Georgia. Clinton suggests not putting cigars into any woman's vagina, a reference to his alleged sexual act with former White House intern Monica Lewinsky during the Lewinsky scandal. David Letterman says, "When they ask you for money, pay them", a reference to the October 2009 scandal in which CBS producer Joe Halderman attempted to blackmail Letterman with information about his sexual affairs.

When a doctor explains auto-erotic asphyxiation to Kenny, Kyle and Butters, he refers to the deaths of actor David Carradine and INXS singer Michael Hutchence (the latter of whose death was actually ruled a suicide, rather than by auto-erotic asphyxiation). After it is explained to Kenny that auto-erotic asphyxiation often involves wearing a costume of some type, he dons a costume of Batman, the DC Comics fictional superhero, and subsequently dies in the outfit. The title of the episode is derived from the song of the same name by soul singer Marvin Gaye. A version of the song, sung by series co-creator Trey Parker, is featured at the end of the episode, when the celebrities claim the sexual addiction has left their bodies. The angry and violent confrontations between Woods and Nordegren are portrayed not as reality within the episode, but as simulated elements of the newest Tiger Woods PGA Tour video game installment by EA Sports. Scientists from the Centers for Disease Control, a federal agency under the U.S. Department of Health and Human Services, conduct experiments on chimpanzees in "Sexual Healing" to discover why celebrities crave sex with multiple women. The ending where President Obama is addressing a crowd at the United States Capitol is a reference to the ending of Deep Impact.

== Reception ==
In its original American broadcast on March 17, 2010, "Sexual Healing" was watched by 3.7 million viewers, according to the Nielsen Media Research, making it the most watched South Park debut since the third season premiere "Rainforest Shmainforest" in 1999. The day it aired, "Sexual Healing" was the highest-rated show in all of television among men between ages 18 and 34, and was the highest rated cable show among adults between ages 18 and 49. March 17 ranked as the most-watched night of the year for Comedy Central. "Sexual Healing" drew a 2.6 overall rating, a 2.4 rating among adults between ages 18 and 49, a 5.2 rating among men between ages 18 and 34, and a 6.9 rating among men between ages 18 and 24. "Sexual Healing" aired before the series premiere of the animated comedy series Ugly Americans, which drew 2.1 million viewers. The network was also the highest-rated and most-watched overall television network among men between ages 18 and 24, and the highest-rated and most-watched cable network among adults between ages 18 and 49 and men between ages 18 and 34.

Trey Parker and Matt Stone have gotten huge mileage out of South Park's blink-of-an-eye turnaround time [but here] we get the same gag beaten into the ground over an occasionally amusing but mostly tedious twenty minutes.

— Zack Handlen
The A.V. Club

"Sexual Healing" received generally mixed reviews. Bill Harris of the Toronto Sun praised the timeliness of the episode, which he said has kept South Park relevant throughout its 14 seasons. Harris complimented the episode for addressing the larger issue of how sexual acts among celebrities are dissected and analyzed by the media and public. MTV News praised the Woods parody, which they said was particularly timely because of the golf pro's recent announcement to return to golf. It said, "It was on-the-nose while still being clever, which is a balance that the makers of "South Park" have mastered brilliantly." Bill Brownstein, from the Canwest News Service, called it "an absolutely blistering and timely satire" on Woods and sexual addiction. A CNN review called the Woods satire "brilliant" and a strong improvement over the previous season's "Dead Celebrities", which also included several cameos of celebrity parodies. The review also found the ending of the episode, with Stan and Cartman growing bored with their video game once it focused on golf rather than sex scandals and fighting, to be a "pretty hilarious gag". Ryan Waxon, of The Cowl, said "Sexual Healing" stood out from other Woods jokes and proved Parker and Stone "can do satire like nobody else". He particularly praised the Woods video game and the subplot with Butters trying to learn about women's pubic hair, claiming, "Butters’ low intelligence and complete innocence make for some the greatest moments that the show has to offer."

Entertainment Weekly television reviewer Ken Tucker said the episode was "rather short on laugh-out-loud funniness", but included several clever ideas, including the Tiger Woods video game, the satire of the media attention to the Woods scandal, and "one of the best Kenny death scenes ever". Newsweek writer Joshua Alston said the Woods parody "didn't manage to be terribly funny or insightful", and suggested the speed at which South Park writers can produce a topical episode just days before its broadcast is actually a detriment to the show. Alston said, "Whereas once the show's creators swiftly turned around topical episodes because they could, now the South Park team is expected to seize on the news." Ramsey Isler of IGN found much of the episode's humor mediocre, in particular the rehabilitation of the celebrities and the CDC studies of the chimpanzees. Isler said he enjoyed Kenny's death and Butters' obsession with "bush", but felt the theme of the episode was too obvious and less clever than previous South Park episodes. The A.V. Club writer Zack Handlen appreciated the timeliness and relevance of the subject matter, but felt "the satirical target here wasn't meaty enough to warrant a full episode, and the developing plot just felt too half-assed". Handlen said some individual jokes were funny, but the episode as a whole was too one-note and redundant. Carlos Delgado of iF Magazine said the Woods scandal was several months old, so the episode felt stale and old news. Delgado felt the alien infection theory was too random and lazy, and the idea that men would cheat on their wives if they had more money and opportunity was offensive, but not entirely untrue.

Within days of the episode's original broadcast, rumors began to spread throughout the Internet that EA Sports planned to sue Parker and Stone over their portrayal of the Tiger Woods PGA Tour video game in "Sexual Healing". The rumor began with a March 21 post on the blog Daily Informer, which quoted an unnamed EA Sports source who said the episode had "a few copyright infringements in there that I’m sure will be dealt with accordingly". The claims quickly spread to other blogs and websites, but EA Sports specifically denied the rumor, claiming, "The reports that EA Sports is planning to sue the creators of 'South Park' are completely false."

== Home media ==
"Sexual Healing", along with the thirteen other episodes from South Park's fourteenth season, were released on a three-disc DVD set and two-disc Blu-ray set in the United States on April 26, 2011.
