= Super Best Friends =

- South Park episode
- Muhammad, as portrayed in "Super Best Friends", is described as "the Muslim prophet with the powers of flame".
- Episode no.: Season 5 Episode 3
- Directed by: Trey Parker
- Written by: Trey Parker
- Production code: 504
- Original air date: July 4, 2001

Episode chronology
← Previous "Cripple Fight"	Next → "Scott Tenorman Must Die"
- South Park season 5

"Super Best Friends" is the third episode of the fifth season of the American animated television series South Park and the 68th episode of the series overall. This episode is not the third of Season 5, but rather the fourth, per the production order. In the United States, it debuted on Comedy Central on July 4, 2001. Stan, Kyle, Cartman, and Kenny decide to join magician David Blaine's cult, the Blaintologists, after seeing him perform in South Park. Stan tries to persuade the others that they have been indoctrinated after quickly realizing that the Blaintologists are not as kind as they seem.

Teaming up with Jesus, Stan calls upon the Super Best Friends, a parody of the Super Friends, to destroy Blaine and thwart the mass suicide pact he has launched.

The episode was written by series co-creator Trey Parker and is rated TV-MA in the United States. It depicts several religious figures, including Muhammad, whose appearance at the time of the original airing led to little to no controversy. Following outrage from Muslims regarding Muhammad's portrayal in the 2010 episodes "200" and "201", Comedy Central pulled the episode from their rerun rotation and the South Park Studios website no longer streams "Super Best Friends", nor is it available for streaming or purchase from online stores. It is one of five episodes which are unavailable on streaming services, along with season 14's aforementioned "200" and "201", as well as season 10's "Cartoon Wars Part I" and "Cartoon Wars Part II", all of which discuss depictions of Muhammad.

== Plot ==
When David Blaine comes to South Park, he uses his street magic to enchant the locals, including Kyle, Stan, Cartman, and Kenny. The youngsters, intrigued by his powers, join the cult of 'Blaintology,' in the hopes of learning more about magic. Stan becomes progressively more disturbed by the cult and soon leaves, but Kyle refuses to join him, and so Stan asks Jesus for help. Meanwhile, Kyle and Cartman go door to door in a recruitment drive, sporting nametags labeled "Elder Kyle" and "Elder Cartman".

Jesus appears at Blaine's show in Denver, and challenges him by performing the miracle of the loaves and fish... after requesting that everybody in the audience turn around; Blaine manages to win the crowd with much more powerful enchantments. Jesus promptly requires the assistance of the Super Best Friends: a group of major religious figures including Muhammad, Buddha, Moses, Joseph Smith, Krishna, Laozi and Seaman, an Aquaman-like character. They are dedicated to defending the world against evil (except for Buddha, who "doesn't really believe in evil").

The Blaintologists, meanwhile, petition the government for tax-exempt status. Their request is denied, and all the Blaintologists are told that they are to commit mass suicide in Washington, D.C. Kyle is shown to have escaped the cult's control, but when he tries to convince Cartman that they should flee, Cartman reports him, and Kyle is imprisoned in a glass bubble and forced to participate at the mass suicide. When word about the mass suicide reaches the Super Best Friends, they consult Moses (previously seen in "Jewbilee") for advice.

In D.C., the Blaintologists begin to drown themselves in the Reflecting Pool even though it is only approximately a foot deep, while Cartman installs a hose in Kyle's glass bubble to fill it with water, so as to drown him. The Super Best Friends arrive at the scene, to which Blaine responds by animating the statue of Abraham Lincoln to fight them.

Meanwhile, Stan searches for his friends, first finding Kenny drowned in the pool and shouting "Oh, my God! They killed Kenny!", to which Kyle replies "You bastards!"; they alternately repeat their catchphrases in Marco Polo fashion to find each other. In order to defeat the Abraham Lincoln statue, the Super Best Friends create a giant animated John Wilkes Booth statue, which shoots it in the head, causing it to fall over and shatter Kyle's prison. Afterwards, Joseph Smith uses his ice powers to freeze the reflecting pool so as to prevent more suicides.

It is revealed that Cartman has not managed to kill himself, as he keeps coming up for air. Blaine curses the Super Best Friends for ruining his plans and flies away in a rocket ship. Stan finally announces that any religion which forces people to relinquish their money or control over their lives is really a cult. After his speech, Kyle reconciles with Stan. Cartman then gives a sarcastic, insulting compliment to Stan and Kyle; however, they get angry and then decide to amuse themselves with punching and kicking Cartman in the testicles. The episode ends with the Super Best Friends flying away.

== References to Scientology ==
In the DVD commentary, Parker states that the episode's references to real-life magician David Blaine and Blaintology were allusions to Scientology.

== Depiction of Muhammad ==
In 2005, cartoon depictions of Muhammad became more controversial during the Jyllands-Posten Muhammad cartoons controversy. The creators of South Park returned to this theme in later episodes, parodying censorship attempts and portraying Muhammad again in the 2006 episodes "Cartoon Wars Part I" and "Cartoon Wars Part II" and again in the 2010 episode "200". Further controversy ensued, and one group, "Revolution Muslim", warned that South Park's creators would "probably wind up like Theo van Gogh". Around this time, the original "Super Best Friends" episode was removed from the South Park Studios website.

== Home media ==
"Super Best Friends," along with the thirteen other episodes from South Park: The Complete Fifth Season, was released as part of a three-disc DVD set in the United States on February 22, 2005. The set included brief audio commentaries by Parker and Stone for each episode.

The episode was included in the re-release of the fifth season on Blu-ray, released on December 5, 2017. This was the first time the episode was made available in HD, as the episode was not released alongside the rest of the season when it debuted in HD on iTunes in 2011. The episode is shown in its original presentation, without Muhammad's image being obscured as in later episodes of the series.

== See also ==
- Depictions of Muhammad
