= The Tale of Scrotie McBoogerballs =

- South Park episode
- Episode no.: Season 14; Episode 2
- Directed by: Trey Parker
- Written by: Trey Parker; Matt Stone
- Production code: 1402
- Original air date: March 24, 2010

Episode chronology
← Previous "Sexual Healing"	Next → "Medicinal Fried Chicken"
- South Park season 14

"The Tale of Scrotie McBoogerballs" is the second episode of the fourteenth season of the American animated television series South Park, and the 197th overall episode of the series. It originally aired on Comedy Central in the United States on March 24, 2010. The plot centers upon a prank book manuscript anonymously written by fourth grade classmates Kyle, Stan, Kenny, and Cartman, whose vulgar content nauseates all who read it, but who also laud it as a masterpiece. The prank backfires when classmate Butters who (the boys convinced everyone) is the actual author of the book, is hailed a literary genius, and the book is analyzed for profound subtext that the boys never intended.

The episode was written and directed by series co-creators Trey Parker and Matt Stone, and was rated TV-MA L in the United States. It serves as a satire of pop culture criticism, and mocks people who find hidden messages in works which are not intended to be analysed. The episode includes other themes, including the lack of interest in reading among American youths, and also mocks the idea that a book alone can inspire someone into committing violent crimes.

The novel The Catcher in the Rye by J. D. Salinger plays a major part in the episode, as the South Park boys are inspired to write their own book when they feel Salinger's book does not live up to its controversial reputation. The episode also satirizes actress Sarah Jessica Parker and the Kardashian family.

"The Tale of Scrotie McBoogerballs" received generally positive reviews, with many commentators praising the episode's themes of the over-analysis of works of culture. According to Nielsen Media Research, the episode was seen by 3.24 million viewers. After the episode aired, Kim, Kourtney, and Khloé Kardashian praised their portrayal.

== Plot ==
The fourth-grade students of South Park Elementary are assigned to read The Catcher in the Rye, and are excited when Mr. Garrison tells of its controversial history: with Kyle remarking that the novel inspired the killing of John Lennon to Cartman's delight. Although the class asks to read the novel immediately, they are refused by Garrison, who urges the students to be mature about the controversial novel. After reading the book, Stan, Kyle, Cartman, and Kenny perceive it to be completely inoffensive: summarizing it as "some whiny teenager talking about how lame he is", and feel that the school has "tricked" them into reading. In response, they decide to write their own novel, The Tale of Scrotie McBoogerballs, to be deliberately offensive and become "way more banned" than The Catcher in the Rye.

Later, Stan's parents find and read the manuscript. Their disgust is such that they cannot read it without vomiting profusely, though they perceive it to be literary genius and inform the other parents. Fearing that they will be reprimanded, the boys convince Butters that he wrote the book while sleepwalking. Butters believes them, because after reading The Catcher in the Rye he feels as though he has been entering into altered states of consciousness that make him want to kill others, only to find that his intended targets have long been deceased. Butters confesses to writing the novel but is surprised at the adults' positive response. To the other boys' anger, a representative from Penguin Books agrees to sign Butters for a book deal.

The Tale of Scrotie McBoogerballs becomes a success, to which consumers attest despite vomiting as they read the book. As Butters' success grows, the other boys unsuccessfully campaign to have the book banned. They are annoyed to find readers interpreting passages from the novel as allegories for contentious political issues, which was never their intent. Since Sarah Jessica Parker is routinely mocked in the book, Cartman and Kenny plan to have her killed, assuming that the public reaction and media attention would be ensured as a result of the book's ban. They fit Parker with antlers to disguise her as a moose, before abandoning her in the woods during hunting season.

Butters later writes his own book, The Poop That Took a Pee, which consists solely of simple descriptions of coprophilia juxtaposed with toilet humor. The four boys are convinced that the book will be a failure and publicly expose Butters as a fraud over the first book. Much to their annoyance, however, while readers are not as disgusted by the new book, they nonetheless perceive it as even more profound and continue making their own interpretations. After finishing the book, one crazed reader crashes a taping of Keeping Up with the Kardashians and kills the entire Kardashian family in a mass shooting.

Both The Tale of Scrotie McBoogerballs and The Poop That Took a Pee are banned as a result, and Butters is devastated, mainly because he was a devoted fan of Kim Kardashian. Stan and Kyle suggest that rather than reading books and mindlessly interpreting them, people should simply watch television instead. Cartman also convinces Butters that he is responsible for Parker's death. Butters is initially shocked to learn this but then calms down, saying, "Oh well, at least she was ugly."

== Production and theme ==
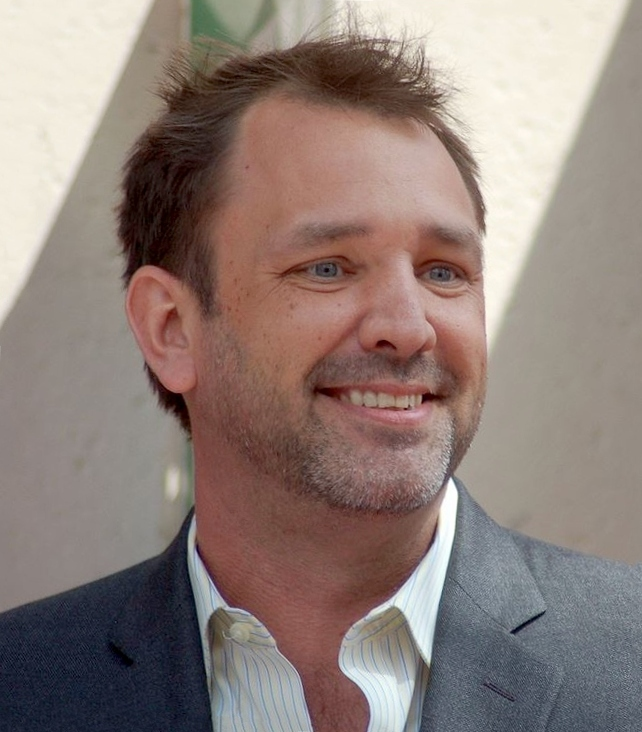
South Park co-creator Trey Parker wrote "The Tale of Scrotie McBoogerballs".

"The Tale of Scrotie McBoogerballs" was written and directed by series co-creator Trey Parker, and was rated TV-MA in the United States. It originally aired on Comedy Central in the United States on March 24, 2010. The episode serves primarily as a satire of pop culture criticism. Although the South Park boys wrote The Tale of Scrotie McBoogerballs simply to shock and offend people, readers delve too deeply into the meaning behind the book, finding hidden allegories and symbolism that the actual authors insist are not present. People with conflicting philosophies, including liberals and conservatives, and pro-choice and pro-life advocates, attempt to claim that the same work conveys and validates their own ideology. The script serves as a criticism of people who take such works of pop culture too seriously. Although this is demonstrated specifically through literary criticism in the episode, the theme can be extended to film criticism and television criticism as well. The episode suggests people are so desperate for inspiration, they are willing to impose their hopes and dreams into works of art, even if they completely lack those qualities. Some commentators thought South Park creators Parker and Matt Stone were implicitly mocking the amount of analysis into deeper meaning South Park itself often receives in its reviews. Others have suggested this over-analysis is a reference to the number of adult themes identified in the Harry Potter and Twilight young adult novel series.

"The Tale of Scrotie McBoogerBalls" portrays young children as almost entirely uninterested in reading. The South Park boys exhibit excitement for their reading assignment only based on the promise of offensive and controversial material in the book. Rather than finding any merit in the book, the boys are angry when they find the material inoffensive, prompting Cartman to declare he has been "tricked" into reading an entire book. Through the rise and fall of Butters' career as an author, the episode also demonstrates the perils of literary success and hoaxes. The episode also lampoons the notion that a book can be identified as the sole reason for a reader to kill somebody, particularly through Butters' reaction to The Tale of Scrotie McBoogerballs. Butters experiences blackouts after reading The Catcher in the Rye and chanting "Kill John Lennon/Ronald Reagan!", until he disappointingly learns they are already dead. Later, a reader of The Poop That Took a Pee murders the Kardashian family.

== Cultural references ==
The Catcher in the Rye, the 1951 novel about teenage confusion and alienation by J.D. Salinger, plays a central role in the episode, which references the controversy that the book had generated in the years since its publication, owing to its risqué elements and use of foul language. Mr. Garrison tells the students the book has only recently been lifted from South Park Elementary's banned books list, a reference to past censorship the book has received in public schools. The episode also refers to the role that the book played in inspiring Mark David Chapman to shoot and kill musician John Lennon, and John Hinckley Jr. to attempt to assassinate former U.S. President Ronald Reagan. Lennon, a former member of The Beatles and long-time peace activist, is referred to by Cartman as "the king of hippies".

The final passage of The Tale of Scrotie McBoogerballs parodies the ending of Nelson Algren's 1956 novel A Walk on the Wild Side, which reads: "That was all long ago in some brief lost spring, in a place that is no more. In that hour that frogs begin and the scent off the mesquite comes strongest."

The episode also prominently features the Kardashian family, who are the focus of the E! reality series Keeping Up with the Kardashians. Sarah Jessica Parker, an actress mocked on South Park before, is also lampooned in the story.

During one scene, Butters appears on Today, a morning talk show on NBC (referred to as HBC in the episode, but with NBC's peacock logo), to promote his book. Television hosts Matt Lauer and Meredith Vieira are featured in the scene, during which both vomit for a particularly long time in response to some of the more vulgar passages in The Tale of Scrotie McBoogerballs. Morgan Freeman, an actor known for his narration work, conducts a reading in the episode of Butters' second book, The Poop That Took a Pee. Trey Parker provided the voice of Freeman in "The Tale of Scrotie McBoogerballs". During one scene, Butters' father can be seen reading a newspaper with a front-page story about a historic health care bill passing, a reference to the Patient Protection and Affordable Care Act, which was passed and signed the same week the South Park episode first aired.

== Release and reception ==
In its original American broadcast on March 24, 2010, "The Tale of Scrotie McBoogerballs" was watched by 3.24 million viewers, according to the Nielsen Media Research, making it the most watched cable television show of the night. The episode received an overall 1.9 rating/3 share. Among viewers between ages 18 and 49, it received a 1.8 rating/5 share, and among male viewers between 18 and 34, it received a 3.5 rating/12 share. As a result of the episode, the phrase "Scrotie McBoogerballs" was the top trending topic for March 25 on the social networking and microblogging website Twitter. "The Tale of Scrotie McBoogerballs", along with the thirteen other episodes from South Park's fourteenth season, was released on a three-disc DVD set and two-disc Blu-ray set in the United States on April 26, 2011. The episode was also released on the two-disc DVD collection A Little Box of Butters.

It was classic South Park. Smart, crude, and hilarious. With one episode, there is a renewed sense of hope that season fourteen will live up to the expectations set before it. ... It's pure gold, South Park style.

— Carlos Delgado
iF Magazine

"The Tale of Scrotie McBoogerballs" received generally positive reviews. Carlos Delgado of iF Magazine called the episode a potential classic and a "phenomenal follow up showing" to the season premiere "Sexual Healing", which he did not enjoy. Delgado said the script was intelligent and praised the theme of over-analyzing art. He also praised the vomiting jokes and said he could not remember the last time he laughed so hard during a South Park episode. Entertainment Weekly television columnist Ken Tucker said it was better than the season premiere, which he also praised. Tucker particularly enjoyed the satire of pop culture criticism, and wrote, "I'd compare the Scrotie episode to the work of Rabelais, Henry Miller, and Dennis Cooper, but then I'd be part of the boys' satire, wouldn't I?"

TV Fanatic said the episode was not as strong as previous seasons, but an improvement over "Sexual Healing". The site praised the emphasis on Butters and the pop culture references to The Catcher in the Rye, John Lennon, Sarah Jessica Parker and "the useless Kardashian Klan". The A.V. Club writer Sean O'Neal said he "chuckled a few times", but found the vomit jokes acted like a substitute for "actual dialogue". However, O'Neal praised the satire of people looking too deeply into the meaning of meaningless art, and how easily that theme can be applied to South Park itself. Not all reviews were entirely positive. Ramsey Isler of IGN said Butters was "awesome, as usual", and thought the jokes about the Kardashians were funny, but that the positive elements of the episode were "not enough to balance out the failures". He particularly criticized the Sarah Jessica Parker jokes as "flat and random", and the constant vomiting as "just one long-running 'joke' that was just plain awful".

The day after "The Tale of Scrotie McBoogerballs" aired, members of the Kardashian family responded positively to their portrayal and on-screen deaths. On her blog, Kim Kardashian wrote that the family found the episode very funny and were honored to be featured in the episode. She wrote, "We were all dying when we saw this clip from South Park that aired last night... literally, LOL. They killed us all!!!" She also wrote, "I managed to survive the longest... of course!" Kourtney Kardashian joked on her Twitter page, "How rude! Southpark!!", Khloé Kardashian wrote she did not know about her appearance on the show until she suddenly received numerous messages on her Twitter page. Khloé also said she found the scene funny, and laughed at how unattractively she and her sisters were portrayed, although she said the Caitlyn Jenner cartoon looked very realistic. She wrote, "Even though we all weren't portrayed as the most attractive South Park characters, I was still so flattered since I love that show haha."
