= I'm a Little Bit Country =

- South Park episode
- Episode no.: Season 7 Episode 4
- Directed by: Trey Parker
- Written by: Trey Parker
- Production code: 701
- Original air date: April 9, 2003

Guest appearance
- Norman Lear as Benjamin Franklin

Episode chronology
← Previous "Toilet Paper"	Next → "Fat Butt and Pancake Head"
- South Park season 7

"I'm a Little Bit Country" is the fourth episode of the seventh season of the American animated television series South Park, and the 100th episode of the series overall. It originally aired on Comedy Central in the United States on April 9, 2003. The episode title is based on the song "A Little Bit Country, A Little Bit Rock and Roll" by Marty Cooper, as made famous by Donny and Marie Osmond.

The episode aired almost three weeks after the start of the invasion of Iraq and the start of the Iraq War. In the episode, the boys join some anti-war protesters because it's a free pass out of school for the day. Their simple plan to protest their way out of class goes south when they find themselves in the middle of the two opposing sides of the issue. Meanwhile, Cartman attempts a flashback to 1776 to avoid studying for his American History assignment.

The episode was written by series co-creator Trey Parker.

== Plot ==
When Mr. Garrison agrees to let anyone protesting the war out of school early for a rally, all the kids pretend to care about the cause so as to get out of school early, even though they know little to nothing about the war. Some of the townspeople are protesting against the war, while others are supporting it. While the rest of the school races to enjoy their day off, the boys lag behind to watch the protest and end up being interviewed for their views on what the Founding Fathers would think about the protests and the war in Iraq that the protests were about.

It becomes clear that they do not know who the Founding Fathers were, and angered at the embarrassment, Garrison gives his class an assignment to figure out what the founding fathers' views of the war would have been. While Stan, Kyle, and Kenny begin to study for their project, Eric Cartman decides to take a different approach, trying to induce a flashback of the colonial era to get out of studying, first by saying clichéd flashback-inducing dialogue, and then by dropping a large rock on his head.

The people of the town are divided about the war, and after splitting in two, they both plan rallies: one pro-war (hawks), one anti-war (doves), both on the same day in the same place. Mayor McDaniels says that the town square is a public place, and if neither group wants to move, they'll have to share the space. The stage is split down the middle, and on the day of the protest, they end up having a large argument during both rallies, and ultimately get into a huge fight where they all begin to kill each other.

Eventually, Cartman electrocutes himself in water with a TiVo full of colonial documentaries from The History Channel in order to induce a flashback, which lands him into the hospital with a coma, much to Stan, Kyle and Kenny's frustration. To make matters worse, Kenny is forced to join the hawks (as his father himself happens to be pro-war), leaving an annoyed Stan and Kyle to fend for themselves in the project.

Meanwhile, in Cartman's mind, he travels back to the colonial era in Philadelphia. After murdering the official messenger boy, he manages to get the job of delivering the Declaration of Independence from Thomas Jefferson's home to the Continental Congress for a vote; there, a great argument breaks out about whether or not to go to war against England, paralleling the events in present-day South Park, which Cartman recognizes as being "very, very relevant". While both protests rage on, Benjamin Franklin (Norman Lear) shows up and announces that he believes the new country must not seem to be a war-monger to the rest of the world, but it cannot appear to be weak either. Therefore, it must go to war but allow protests, thereby acting like it does not want war. He refers to this as "saying one thing and doing another". One member refers to this as "having our cake and eating it too". Having learned what the Founding Fathers would say, Cartman wakes up at the hospital and goes to the town square protest to tell them what he learned.

Meanwhile, both sides decide to use Stan and Kyle's project to justify their opinion about the war. However, when on stage, Stan and Kyle admit that they didn't do their project because of losing Cartman and Kenny, as well as failing to keep track of Daylight Savings time and find anything valuable in the history books. Another argument erupts, but Cartman arrives and gets them to stop by telling the town what he learned in the colonial era about America saying one thing and doing another, and how the system works.

The hawks and the doves learn to appreciate their differences and how they're both needed in the system of saying one thing and doing another and sing a song about it. During the song, they celebrate their differences and their achievement (100 episodes); ending the song with the line, "For the war, against the war—who cares! 100 episodes!" Despite knowing that the protests have been pacified thanks to Cartman's speech, Stan and Kenny are left speechless while an unimpressed Kyle ends the episode by saying "I hate this town. I really, really do."

== Production ==
Matt and Trey noticed that while all the pro-Iraq War songs were by country artists, all the anti-war songs were by rockers. This made them think of the old Donny and Marie standard, "I'm A Little Bit Country, I'm A Little Bit Rock 'N Roll" Thus the entire episode hinged on getting rights to use the song—rights that weren't secured until the last possible moment.

Benjamin Franklin is voiced by TV producer Norman Lear (who also served as a creative consultant for this episode). The flashback was inspired by Lear's touring around schools with a copy of the Declaration of Independence.

== Release and reception ==
"I'm a Little Bit Country", along with the fourteen other episodes from The Complete Seventh Season, were released on a three-disc DVD set in the United States on March 21, 2006. The sets included brief audio commentaries by Parker and Stone for each episode.

Keith Finn of the Daily Nebraskan praised the episode's portrayal of the United States's two-party system and free speech.
