= South Park controversies =

South Park is an American animated sitcom created by Trey Parker and Matt Stone. Its frequent depiction of taboo subject matter, unusual (especially sophomoric) humor and portrayal of religion for comic effect has generated controversy, ire from critics, and debate throughout the world over the course of its 29 seasons. Stone and Parker, who also write the show, use it frequently to lampoon a wide range of topics and both sides of contentious issues.

Parker and Stone usually reply to such controversies by regarding themselves as "equal opportunity offenders". They reject the notion of political correctness, and state that no particular topic or group of people will be exempt from mockery and satire, out of fairness to any person or group of people who have been ridiculed before.

== Rating ==
=== United States ===
In the United States, South Park is mainly rated TV-MA. To note, some episodes in syndication have been reclassified TV-14. However, starting in 2017, uncut airings of South Park on Comedy Central have been receiving a TV-14-DLSV rating, mainly from the first 20 seasons. Episodes from season 22-onwards, as well as particularly offensive episodes (i.e., "Bloody Mary", "Trapped in the Closet"), still carry the TV-MA rating.

=== Australia ===
In Australia, the first three seasons, and some episodes in season 4, were rated M: Recommended for mature audiences 15 years and over. The M rating is unrestricted and moderate in impact, and it is equivalent to America's TV-14 rating. The latter seasons are rated MA15+, which is a rating restricted for people 15 years and older unless accompanied by adult, and is strong in impact. Despite being rated M on television, the season 3 DVD set was the first season to receive an MA15+ rating. The consumer advice usually goes as follows; Adult themes (A), coarse language (L), sexual references (S) and/or animated violence (V). Depending on the rating, the terms "moderate" and "strong" precede these descriptions.

The video game, South Park: The Stick of Truth, was initially banned. Due to backlash, however, a censored version would be released for Australia along with Israel and Europe, receiving an R18+ rating, much like the other video games based on the series. One scene and one minigame were banned in the Australian release. The banned scene featured a character (the show's protagonists are depicted as primary school children) surrounded by aliens, being probed with a so-called 'anal probe' in the shape of a penis. Additionally, the scene was interactive. The scene was classified as "child sexual abuse" and banned twice. The banned minigame was also interactive and instructed the player to perform abortion on Randy Marsh. South Australia was the last state to decriminalize abortion, doing so on January 1, 2021.

=== United Kingdom ===
In the United Kingdom, the show is generally rated 15 but only season 7 received an 18 rating due to the audio commentaries (the episodes are only rated 15). However, some episodes, such as those in the first four seasons, do have a 12 rating (Cartman Gets an Anal Probe). Furthermore, the season 3 DVD set was originally rated 18 in the United Kingdom, Canada and Ireland, due to references to child molestation in the final episode, World Wide Recorder Concert. It was re-rated 15 in the United Kingdom upon its re-release in 2008, although in Ireland it is still rated 18, as are a number of episodes in the latter seasons. Later in the series, season 20 was rated 18 due to strong sex references, and season 22 was also rated 18 for child sexual abuse references.

=== Canada ===
In Canada, the VHS/DVD sets were originally rated 18A, but later re-rated to a 14A rating. On Canadian streaming services such as CraveTV, it carries an 18+ rating for violence (V), strong language (L), sex (S), nudity (N) and mature themes (M).

=== New Zealand ===
Season 4 and Season 16 are the only seasons rated R13 in New Zealand and the first season is rated M, akin to Australia's rating. The rest of the seasons have an R16 rating. The television rating of the show in New Zealand is AO (adults only).

=== Spain ===
In Spain, the show is rated 13 (years and above).

=== India ===
South Park was banned in India in 2010. According to VH1 India's channel head Ferzad Palia, after being reviewed by the Indian Ministry of Broadcasting, the show was banned for its vulgarity. However, in 2019, South Park was added to Netflix India, where it is rated 18+ for strong language and nudity.

== Criticism and protests ==
As the series first became popular in the United States, several schools punished students for wearing T-shirts related to the series, while a group of school principals in New Jersey mounted a small campaign to notify parents of the show's content. Hickory Flat Elementary School in Cherokee County, Georgia, issued a ban on wearing any South Park clothing. In a 1999 poll conducted by NatWest Bank, eight and nine-year-old children in the United Kingdom voted the show's character Eric Cartman their favorite personality. This drew the concern of several parent councils, who were expecting that a children's television show character would top the list, and the headmaster of a Cambridgeshire public school urged parents to prevent their children from watching the show. While not opposed to allowing kids to watch the show, Parker and Stone, did however assert that the show is not meant to be viewed by kids, and it is almost always rated TV-MA, while being accompanied by the following warning: "All characters and events in this show—even those based on real people—are entirely fictional. All celebrity voices are impersonated... poorly. The following program contains coarse language and due to its content it should not be viewed by anyone."

Conservative activist L. Brent Bozell III, founder of the advocacy group Parents Television Council (PTC), has frequently criticized the show. Calling it "sordid" and "filth", Bozell said it "shouldn't have been made".

Action for Children's Television founder Peggy Charren claimed that the show's use of language and racial slurs represents the depravity of Western civilization, and that it is "dangerous to the democracy".

Several other Christian activist groups have protested the show's parodies of Christianity-related matter and portrayal of Jesus Christ—whom South Park has depicted blaspheming, shooting and stabbing other characters, and as unable to perform actual miracles. The Christian Family Network prepared an educational guide on how to "protect youth from vile trash like South Park", and claims that their efforts to "restore morality, and protect life for the individual, family, and community" would be impeded if children watched the series.

Stone insists that "[kids] don't have any kind of social tact or etiquette", and claims that parents who disapprove of South Park for its portrayal of how kids behave are upset because they "have an idyllic vision of what kids are like".

Several groups have called for a boycott of the show, its sponsors, and the networks that air it. For example, in late 2008, on behalf of Muslim activists and members of the Russian Pentecostal Church, a group of prosecutors in Moscow sought to have the Russian channel 2×2 closed in an attempt to prevent them from broadcasting the series, which they claimed promoted "hatred between religions". Their appeal was rejected by Russian media officials, and the channel's broadcasting license was extended until 2013. Aside from the efforts in Russia, no group or individual in a country where the show is aired has mounted a significant campaign to ban the series and its availability on home media entirely.

A Canadian judge in the Calgary Judicial District has described South Park as a "vulgar, socially irreverent program that contributes nothing to society".

Critics have also panned the show for being "preachy". In The Drawn Together Movie: The Movie!, the film adaptation of another Comedy Central animated series, Drawn Together, South Park was criticized for its sense of humor and use of social commentary. The show was also parodied in The Simpsons episode "The Bart of War".

These protests actually inspired the plotline of the show's 1999 film adaptation.

== Vulgarity and depiction of racism ==
The show further lampooned the controversy surrounding its use of profanity, as well as the media attention surrounding the network show Chicago Hope's single use of the word "shit", with the season five premiere "It Hits the Fan". A counter superimposed on the bottom left corner of the screen tracked each of the episode's utterances of the word "shit", which was said 162 times without being bleeped, while also appearing uncensored in written form 32 times, totaling 194 times used. The backlash to the episode was mostly limited to 5,000 disapproving e-mails sent to Comedy Central.

The PTC also criticized the show for its excessive use of the racial epithet "nigger" in the season 11 (2007) premiere "With Apologies to Jesse Jackson". Despite its 43 uncensored uses of the word, the episode generated relatively little other controversy, as many black communities and the NAACP praised the episode for its context and its comedic way of conveying other races' perceptions of how minorities feel upon being targeted with racist language. While some in the Jewish community have praised the show's depiction of the character Eric Cartman holding an antisemitic attitude towards fellow student Kyle Broflovski as a means of accurately portraying what it is like for a young Jewish person to have to endure bigotry as an ethnic minority, other Jewish people have blamed South Park and Cartman for having found themselves surrounded by "acceptable racism".

== Parody of Scientology ==
South Park parodied Scientology in a short that aired as part of the 2000 MTV Movie Awards. The short was titled "The Gauntlet" and also poked fun at John Travolta, a Scientologist. The season five (2001) episode "Super Best Friends" features illusionist David Blaine forming his own cult, called "Blaintology". Parker and Stone have acknowledged that this is meant to be a reference to Scientology.

In the season nine (2005) episode "Trapped in the Closet", Stan Marsh is recognized as the reincarnation of Scientology founder L. Ron Hubbard before denouncing the church as nothing more than "a big fat global scam". Tom Cruise, also a Scientologist, is seen in the episode locking himself in Stan's closet and refusing to come out, as other characters ambiguously plead for him to "come out of the closet" in a parody of rumors involving Cruise's sexuality. One scene retold the story of Xenu, a story Scientology normally attempts to keep confidential and only reveals to members once they make significant monetary contributions to the church. The show's closing credits billed every member of the episode's cast and crew as "John Smith" and "Jane Smith" in a parody of both Cruise's and the church's reputations for litigiousness.

=== Departure of Isaac Hayes ===
On March 13, 2006, nearly two months after having a stroke, Isaac Hayes, the voice of the character Chef, quit South Park. The character was subsequently killed off in the episode "The Return of Chef", which aired two years before Hayes' own death. A press release cited his objections to the show's attitudes toward and depiction of various religions. While the press release did not specifically mention "Trapped in the Closet", Parker and Stone assert that he quit because of the episode and its treatment of Scientology, as Hayes was a member. Stone commented that Hayes practiced a double standard regarding the treatment of religion on South Park: "[We] never heard a peep out of Isaac in any way until we [lampooned] Scientology. He wants a different standard for religions other than his own, and to me, that is where intolerance and bigotry begin". Fox News suggested that, because he was still suffering from the effects of his stroke, Hayes was hospitalized and not in a position to make a rational decision to leave the show. Fox also reported that Hayes left the show because of pressure from fellow Scientologists and that the decision was not voluntary, noting that Hayes had previously defended the episode after an amicable discussion with Parker and Stone about its content. Moreover, the original press release announcing his departure was put out by someone not authorized to represent him. In a 2016 oral history of South Park in The Hollywood Reporter, Hayes's son, Isaac Hayes III, confirmed that the decision to leave the show was made by Hayes's entourage while Hayes was unable to make such decisions on his own.

=== "Closetgate" ===
"Trapped in the Closet" was scheduled to rebroadcast on March 15, 2006, on Comedy Central, but the broadcast was canceled without prior notice and was replaced with a repeat of the season two (1998) episode "Chef's Chocolate Salty Balls". The controversy that soon followed was dubbed "Closetgate" by the Los Angeles Times. Representatives of Comedy Central insist that the episode was changed as a tribute to Hayes following his departure. Comedy Central's parent company, Viacom, also owns Paramount Pictures, which was set to distribute the then-upcoming film Mission: Impossible III, which stars Cruise. Several media outlets alleged that Cruise threatened to boycott the publicity tour for the film unless Viacom canceled the episode's rebroadcast. Comedy Central, as well as Cruise's representative and publicist, immediately denied the allegations. Cruise himself later said that he would not "dignify" the rumors by personally addressing whether they were true.

In response to the episode being pulled, Parker and Stone issued the following statement, with several mocking references to Scientology:

So, Scientology, you may have won THIS battle, but the million-year war for Earth has just begun! Temporarily anozinizing our episode will NOT stop us from keeping Thetans forever trapped in your pitiful man-bodies. Curses and drat! You have obstructed us for now, but your feeble bid to save humanity will fail! Hail Xenu!!!

Mission: Impossible III was released on May 5, 2006, while "Trapped in the Closet" was rebroadcast without controversy on July 19, 2006. Stone stated that he and Parker would have threatened to end their relationship with Comedy Central had the network finally refused to rebroadcast the episode. The episode was nominated for an Emmy, and is included on South Park's 10th Anniversary DVD, called South Park – The Hits, Volume 1, and is the favorite episode of April Stewart, one of the show's voice actors.

== Mormonism ==
Cameron Adams of the Herald Sun highlighted the episode "All About Mormons" among "Top Choice" picks in television. Chris Quinn of the San Antonio Express-News placed the episode at number 7 on his list of: "Top 10 Most Offensive South Park Episodes and Therefore, Maybe The Best, List". The episode was used as an exhibit in discussing Mormonism in popular culture, by Utah Valley State College religious studies professor Dennis Potter, in a presentation titled: "The Americanization of Mormonism Reflected in Pop Culture". The Church of Jesus Christ of Latter-day Saints (LDS Church) called the episode a gross portrayal of church history, but contended that "it inflicted no perceptible or lasting damage to [the] church", and that such portrayals are distractions.

== Depiction of the Virgin Mary ==
Several Roman Catholics took offense at the season nine (2005) finale "Bloody Mary". In the episode, a statue of the Virgin Mary is portrayed as releasing copious amounts of actual blood while undergoing overt menstruation; characters had declared the phenomenon a miracle when they initially thought the blood was flowing from her rectum. Another scene features Pope Benedict XVI closely inspecting the anal and vaginal regions of the statue and being sprayed with blood. The Catholic League for Religious and Civil Rights demanded an apology from Comedy Central and unsuccessfully campaigned to have the episode both removed permanently from the network's rotation and never be made available on DVD. Viacom board member Joseph A. Califano Jr. and the United States Conference of Catholic Bishops issued formal complaints with then-Viacom CEO Tom Freston.

In February 2006, leaders of the New Zealand Catholic Bishops' Conference, the Council of Christians and Muslims, and other religious groups together lobbied media conglomerate CanWest to stop the episode's debut airing and potential rebroadcasts in New Zealand on the music channel C4. The network rejected the Catholic plea of censorship, and was allowed to air the episode, doing so ahead of schedule to take advantage of the media attention surrounding the campaign.

== Censorship of the depiction of Muhammad ==
The season 10 episodes "Cartoon Wars Part I" and "Cartoon Wars Part II" feature a plot in which the Fox network plans to air an episode of the animated show Family Guy that contains an uncensored cartoon depiction of the Islamic prophet, Muhammad. Residents of South Park panic, fearing violent responses similar to those that occurred worldwide after some Muslims regarded cartoon depictions of Muhammad in Danish newspaper Jyllands-Posten as insulting. The first episode had a cliffhanger ending instructing viewers to watch part two to find out whether the image of Muhammad would be shown uncensored. In the second episode, Kyle persuades a Fox executive to air the Family Guy episode with the image uncensored, while echoing Parker and Stone's sentiments regarding what should or should not be censored of "[either] it's got to all be OK or none of it is". Within the universe of the episode, the Family Guy episode is aired uncensored, despite a retaliation threat from Al-Qaeda. When the episode aired on Comedy Central, the channel censored the scene with a title card reading "Comedy Central has refused to broadcast an image of Mohammed on their network" instead of the scene containing Muhammad's depiction, which Parker and Stone say was neutral and not intended to insult Muslims.

Parker and Stone note the contradiction in being allowed to feature a profane depiction of Jesus, while being forbidden to feature a purely benign depiction of Muhammad, but claim they harbor no hard feelings toward Comedy Central for censoring the scene, since the network confessed to being "afraid of getting blown up" rather than claim "religious tolerance" like other networks. Parker and Stone claim the only regrets they have over the incident was that their mocking of the show Family Guy in the episode generated more attention than its commentary on the ethics of censorship. Previously, Muhammad was depicted uncensored and portrayed in a heroic light in the season five (2001) episode "Super Best Friends", which resulted in virtually no controversy. Muhammad also appears among the large crowd of characters gathered behind the main characters and "South Park" sign in some of the show's previous opening sequences.

Parker and Stone repeated this plot for the 200th episode, "200". Again, the depiction was censored throughout the episode. After the episode aired, a leader of Revolution Muslim, an obscure New York-based radical Muslim organization, targeted South Park's creators for satirizing issues surrounding the depiction of Muhammad. The author of the post, Zachary Adam Chesser who went by the username Abu Talhah Al-Amrikee, wrote on Twitter that he prayed for Allah to kill the show's creators and "burn them in Hell for all eternity". He also posted a similar entry on his blog and on the Revolution Muslim website. The post included a picture of the assassination of Dutch filmmaker Theo Van Gogh by a Muslim extremist in 2004, with the caption: "Theo Van Gogh – Have Matt Stone And Trey Parker Forgotten This?" He also noted: "We have to warn Matt and Trey that what they are doing is stupid and they will probably wind up like Theo Van Gogh for airing this show. This is not a threat, but a warning of the reality of what will likely happen to them."

Following the airing of this episode, Malaysia's conservative Pan-Malaysian Islamic Party (PAS) demanded that the makers of South Park apologize to Muslims around the world for its portrayal of Muhammad dressed as a bear, though it was later shown that it was actually Santa inside the suit. "Even though they have added the audio bleeps, South Park's producer and broadcaster should apologize to the Muslims, as this is a sensitive issue", said PAS vice-president Mahfuz Omar. "The show itself spells of bad intention, and the depiction of the Prophet is provocative. It creates religious tension."

The following episode, "201", censored the word "Muhammad" throughout the episode, as well as several lines from the "Super Best Friends" during the final act. According to the South Park Studios webpage, episode "201" was censored by Comedy Central after the studio delivered the episode, but before it was aired. The studio advises that the episode is not available online because they do not have network clearance to air the uncensored episode. A user on the imageboard website 4chan later discovered a partially uncensored version of the episode on the official website's RTMP web server, and it has since been distributed across the Internet.

Due to the controversies, the episode "201" was removed from the British Comedy Central television schedule, and replaced with a repeat of "The Tale of Scrotie McBoogerballs", and the repeat of "200" was replaced with a repeat of "Sexual Healing". The episode "Super Best Friends", previously available via the South Park Studios website has been made unavailable. Additionally, the Netflix streaming version of the episode, also previously available, has been changed to "Disc Only". "Super Best Friends" was also removed from the iTunes Store as well as the Xbox Live Video Marketplace. When the series was added to HBO Max, "Super Best Friends", both parts of "Cartoon Wars", "200", and "201" were all skipped over.

Despite the controversies, "200" and "201" are available on the region 1 release of South Park – The Complete Fourteenth Season disc. The episodes were censored and so were the commentaries regarding the episodes. The regions 2 and 4 releases of South Park – The Complete Fourteenth Season had both "200" and "201" removed for undisclosed reasons, despite the packaging claiming that all fourteen episodes are included in the set.

In the chalkboard gag of The Simpsons episode, "The Squirt and the Whale", Bart pokes fun at the death threats Parker and Stone received by writing "South Park, We'd Stand Beside You If We Weren't So Scared."

== Depiction of Steve Irwin ==
Several viewers criticized the season 10 (2006) episode "Hell on Earth 2006" for its depiction of Steve Irwin with a stingray stuck in his chest. The episode originally aired seven weeks after Irwin, an internationally popular Australian television personality and wildlife expert, died when his heart was pierced by a stingray barb. Several groups and even devout fans of the show derided the scene and its timing as "grossly insensitive" and "classless", while Irwin's widow Terri Irwin expressed concern that her children could one day see the episode.

== Alleged censorship due to Mexican flag ==
In the 2009 episode "Pinewood Derby", several world leaders, including Mexican president Felipe Calderón, are depicted as failing to respond effectively to an international crisis. MTV Latin America's Mexican feed pulled the episode from broadcast in Mexico, sparking controversy among South Park fans in the country, many of whom viewed the decision as censorship. The network denied this interpretation, stating that it had failed to obtain authorization in time from the Secretariat of the Interior to display the Mexican flag on television. After authorization was granted, the episode aired in its entirety on April 4, 2010.

== Post Paris attacks ==
Comedy Central (Netherlands) chose temporarily not to broadcast some scenes from several shows following the November 2015 Paris attacks. While no specifics were given, it included a scene in the 2015 episode "Sponsored Content" where presidential candidate Mr. Garrison states that he knows there is only one way how to deal with Syrian refugees, and the crowd shouts "fuck them all to death".

== Climate change denial ==
South Park has repeatedly mocked the concept of "climate change" and pushed forward "climate change denialist talking points". This happened most prominently in the 2006 episode "ManBearPig", which made fun of US presidential candidate Al Gore and his climate change activism by comparing it to alarmism about a mythical monster. For this the series has been repeatedly criticized by the general media, which called this approach by the popular show as "irresponsible". Twelve years later, in "Time to Get Cereal" as well as "Nobody Got Cereal?", the show tried to reverse its previous stance by depicting its stand-in allegory as an actual real issue and showed the protagonists making (forced) apologies to Al Gore.

The show's turnaround on the issue garnered generally positive reactions from the press, praising the episodes for their humor, braveness and honesty. However, others pointed out that even this depicted reversal was just a "mild repudiation" and a "half-apology"; with this change of heart just being part of what seems to be increased concerns of the creators for the legacy of their long-running show.

== Chinese ban ==
Due to the references to many forbidden topics such as Dalai Lama, Winnie-the-Pooh and organ transplants in the season 23 (2019) episode "Band in China", since the episode's broadcast, South Park has been entirely banned in China: the series' Baidu Baike article, Baidu Tieba forum, Douban page, Zhihu page and Bilibili videos have been deleted or inaccessible to the public. In addition to this fact, all related keywords and topics have been prohibited from being searched and discussed on China-based search engines and social media sites including Baidu, Sina Weibo, WeChat public platform (微信公众号), etc.

== Depiction of Donald Trump and White House response ==
The episode depicted President Donald Trump suing the town of South Park. It mocked Paramount's $16 million settlement with Donald Trump over Kamala Harris's 60 Minutes interview, the Paramount/Skydance merger, Trump administration attacks on free speech and entertainment companies, and Trump's "tiny penis". The episode, and other following episodes showed Trump and the South Park personification of the Christian Devil having a comedic homosexual relationship, with Satan eventually getting pregnant by him and suffering routine abuse.

The Trump administration responded to the episode on July 24 in a statement issued by White House Assistant Press Secretary Taylor Rogers:

"The Left's hypocrisy truly has no end — for years they have come after South Park for what they labeled as 'offense' [sic] content, but suddenly they are praising the show. Just like the creators of South Park, the Left has no authentic or original content, which is why their popularity continues to hit record lows. This show hasn't been relevant for over 20 years and is hanging on by a thread with uninspired ideas in a desperate attempt for attention. President Trump has delivered on more promises in just six months than any other president in our country's history — and no fourth-rate show can derail President Trump's hot streak."

The day after the airing of the episode, series co-creator Trey Parker joked that he was "terribly sorry" for it at their panel during San Diego Comic-Con.

Following episodes in Season 27 and Season 28 would continue to mock Trump, his administration and supporters.

== Controversies unrelated to the show's content ==
=== April Fools' Day prank ===
One of Parker and Stone's earliest responses to the show being condemned as "nothing but bad animation and fart jokes" was creating a show-within-the-show about two even-more-crudely-drawn characters named Terrance and Phillip who do little else but flatulate around each other. The child characters on the show find Terrance and Phillip, who debuted in the season one (1997) episode "Death", to be hysterical, while their parents find them to be horribly offensive. An entire episode featuring the duo aired on April 1, 1998 in lieu of an episode that was supposed to continue from the show's previous episode from four weeks earlier, which ended with a cliffhanger promising to reveal the identity of Cartman's father in the show's next airing. Several fans were angered by the April Fools' Day prank, to which Comedy Central received 2,000 email complaints. Following this, Comedy Central moved the planned air date of the next show up a month so that fans could sooner watch the actual show they originally expected to see. When the episode was aired in the UK on Sky One and Channel 4, it was aired as a season finale, with the recap of the previous episode edited out.

=== Michael Moore ===
Michael Moore interviewed Matt Stone for his 2002 film Bowling for Columbine. Stone discussed his experiences growing up in the Littleton area and the social alienation that might have contributed to the Columbine High School massacre. Stone, who is a gun owner himself, said that Moore's presentation of their interview was fair, but he criticized the director for a short animated segment that followed the interview. The cartoon, which is about the history of guns in the United States, implies that there is a connection between the Ku Klux Klan and the establishment of the National Rifle Association of America. Matt Stone, who did not have anything to do with that short cartoon, criticized Moore for making the cartoon "very South Park-esque" and argued that Moore deliberately sought to give viewers the incorrect impression that he and Trey Parker had produced the animation, by playing these two completely separate segments consecutively. "We have a very specific beef with Michael Moore. I did an interview, and he didn't mischaracterize me or anything I said in the movie. But what he did do was put this cartoon right after me that made it look like we did that cartoon." Stone called it "a good reference to what Michael Moore does in films [...] he creates meaning where there is none by cutting things together". The pair responded by depicting Moore in an unflattering light before having his character blow himself up in their 2004 film Team America: World Police.

== See also ==
- South Park (Park County, Colorado)
- South Park City
