= Make Love, Not Warcraft =

- South Park episode
- Episode no.: Season 10; Episode 8
- Directed by: Trey Parker
- Written by: Trey Parker
- Production code: 1008
- Original air date: October 4, 2006

Episode chronology
← Previous "Tsst"	Next → "Mystery of the Urinal Deuce"
- South Park season 10

"Make Love, Not Warcraft" is the eighth episode in the tenth season of the American animated television series South Park. The 147th episode overall, it first aired on Comedy Central in the United States on October 4, 2006. In the episode, named in a play on words after the 1960s counterculture slogan "Make love, not war", Cartman, Kyle, Stan, and Kenny enjoy playing the popular massively multiplayer online role-playing game World of Warcraft. When a high-level player goes around killing other players in the game, they start playing the game every day to try to stop him. The episode was written and directed by series co-creator Trey Parker. In 2015, he and co-creator Matt Stone listed it as their third-favorite episode of the series.

The episode received critical acclaim, with critics praising its lampooning of nerd culture and use of machinima. It is considered by many fans and critics as one of the best episodes of the series. The episode additionally went on to win a Primetime Emmy Award for Outstanding Animated Program (for programming less than one hour), becoming the first machinima work to win an Emmy.

== Plot ==
A griefer repeatedly kills Cartman, Kyle, Stan, and Kenny's characters in the online game World of Warcraft. Stan's father, Randy, becomes interested in the game, but his character is quickly killed by the griefer; the griefer in reality is a middle-aged obese man whom Blizzard employees deem has "no life". The boys phone their annoyance to Blizzard, but the company executives cannot remove the griefer from the game because his ridiculously high level blocks even their ability to do so.

Cartman rallies his classmates to discuss what should be done, as the griefer proves to be an obstacle for all of them, with the exception of Butters Stotch, who claims that the reason that he uses his computer constantly after school is that he frequently plays Hello Kitty Island Adventure instead. (Note: At the time the episode originally aired in 2006, this was a throwaway line referring to a fictional game. Later, a real game with this title was released in 2023.) The kids of South Park log in at the same time in order to execute a retaliatory attack on the griefer, though they are quickly overpowered after the griefer summons giant scorpions and easily dispatches the kids' characters. This causes everyone to lose hope and stop playing, with the exception of Cartman, who convinces Stan, Kyle, and Kenny to keep playing, and calculates exactly how much time it would take for the four of them to gain as many experience points as the griefer. For the next two months, the boys play the game for 21 hours a day, killing low-level boars in the game's forests to gain experience points. In the process, the boys become lazy, long-haired, obese, and acne-ridden. The boys' characters earn experience points so quickly that the Blizzard executives, who have also been monitoring the griefer, take notice and believe they might have a chance.

Determined to help the boys slay the griefer, the executives decide to give the boys the Sword of a Thousand Truths, a weapon so powerful that it was removed from the game and stored on a 1 GB USB flash drive. However, unaware of the executives' plan, the boys have already initiated what becomes a seventeen-hour battle against the griefer. The executives arrive at Stan's house with the flash drive, unaware that the boys are actually at Cartman's house. Randy tells the executives that he can log in with the sword and give it to the boys' characters online. Eventually logging onto a demo of the game at a Best Buy, Randy gives Stan the weapon, but Randy's character is killed by the griefer in the process. Enraged, Stan attacks the griefer with the sword, draining his shields and mana spells, allowing Kyle and Kenny to attack with effect. Cartman approaches him and proceeds to smash the griefer's character's head with a hammer. Numerous World of Warcraft players celebrate the griefer's defeat, praising the boys as heroes. As Stan contemplates what they do now, Cartman states, "Now we can finally play the game." With Cartman making casual suggestions to boost their characters, the boys begin playing the game as they originally intended.

== Production ==
Machinima was used extensively in "Make Love, Not Warcraft". Here, Stan, Kyle, Cartman, and Kenny's characters stand above the slain griefer.

The episode uses machinima in many of its scenes to create a better emulation of the game. It was originally scheduled to air as the 145th episode, but it was delayed because of difficulties in creating the machinima.

=== Collaboration with Blizzard ===
South Park creators Trey Parker and Matt Stone collaborated with Blizzard Entertainment to craft the machinima used in the episode. They stated in their commentary for the episode that they were completely shocked that the company was on board to help them out. The machinima scenes were created using shots of the in-game footage, and re-creation of the characters in Maya, with Blizzard Entertainment providing their own character models and computers to test with. Blizzard also gave the producers permission to use the alpha server of the expansion pack World of Warcraft: The Burning Crusade on which to shoot the scenes. Michael Morhaime, president and co-founder of Blizzard Entertainment, issued a statement over the collaboration:

"We were excited to hear that the creators of South Park were interested in featuring World of Warcraft in the opening of their new season, and we really enjoyed collaborating with them to make this happen. We're looking forward to sharing the experience with our employees and our players as well when the season debuts this week."

The griefer's design was based on Blizzard cinematics artist Joeyray Hall. As a reference to the episode, certain South Park Season 10 DVDs include a 14-day free trial for World of Warcraft. Since the airing of the episode, the fictitious Sword of a Thousand Truths was featured in the World of Warcraft: The Burning Crusade beta test as a reward to the game's arena system, although it did not have the same capabilities as in the episode.

=== Production length ===
Although the planning of the episode and data-collecting began on September 1, 2006, the actual production of the machinima was done in five "shooting" days, the first being September 20, 2006, which lasted about 3–5 hours, and the last being October 3, 2006, the day before the episode aired. The regular South Park animation was created simultaneously, with all the other non-machinima episodes of the series routinely finishing within 12 hours of their airing as well.

Parker was deeply unhappy with the episode the day before its broadcast, telling the show's producers, "I've lost it. I don't know how to do this anymore." He begged executive producer Anne Garefino to call Comedy Central and inform them that the show would not air, remarking, "I don't want the South Park legacy to be ruined, and this show is going to ruin it, because it's so bad." Parker went home unable to sleep and was surprised the following day that the episode was so well received.

=== Reciprocation ===
In patch 3.0.2, preceding the release of the World of Warcraft expansion pack, Wrath of the Lich King, Blizzard included a "Make Love, Not Warcraft" PvP achievement, gained by using the "hug" emote on a dead enemy before they release their spirit.

The then-fictitious video game played by Butters in this episode, Hello Kitty Island Adventure, was referenced in a 2008 April Fools' Day joke by the official Sanrio blog. This blog post announced an "Island Adventure" expansion to the MMORPG Hello Kitty Online, which consisted of a shrinking of the game world to a single desert island, the introduction of a race of foul-mouthed creatures, and PvP based on the power struggle between Hello Kitty and Badtz-Maru. In 2023, the video game Hello Kitty Island Adventure was announced for Apple Arcade, and was released on July 28, 2023. Zack Zwiezen from Kotaku noted the similarities between the name of the game Butters' played, and the title of the upcoming video game. During a press preview of Hello Kitty Island Adventure, Jill Koch, the senior vice president of Sanrio's marketing, sales and business development, stated that Sanrio and the game has "no tie-in or affiliation with South Park".

Also, in the Wrath of the Lich King remake of the Naxxramas raid instance, a sword called Slayer of the Lifeless was added, bearing the flavour text "Foretold by Salzman", as a reference to Salzman from accounting and a weapon capable of killing that which has no life. The model of the weapon is the same as the one used for the Sword of a Thousand Truths.

The United in Stormwind expansion of Hearthstone added "Elwynn Boar" and "Sword of a Thousand Truths" cards with abilities referencing the events of the episode.

== Reception ==
"Make Love, Not Warcraft" received critical acclaim. IGN gave it an overall rating of 9.3, labeling it as "one of the funniest episodes ever produced". The original television airing of the episode drew 3.4 million viewers, most between the ages of 18 and 49. This popularity made the episode Comedy Central's highest-rated midseason premiere since the year 2000. However, the highest ratings for the tenth season belong to the season's premiere, "The Return of Chef", which drew more than 3.5 million viewers. In 2007, this episode won the Primetime Emmy Award for Outstanding Animated Program (for Programming Less Than One Hour). Fans voted the episode into 1st place in a major 2011 South Park voting held under the "Year of the Fan" iTunes promotion.

== Home media ==
"Make Love, Not Warcraft", along with the thirteen other episodes from South Park's tenth season, was released on a three-disc DVD set in the United States on August 21, 2007. The set includes brief audio commentaries by series co-creators Trey Parker and Matt Stone for each episode.

== See also ==
- 2006 in machinima
- South Park (Park County, Colorado)
- South Park City
