= Crippled Summer =

- South Park episode
- Episode no.: Season 14; Episode 7
- Directed by: Trey Parker
- Written by: Trey Parker
- Production code: 1407
- Original air date: April 28, 2010

Episode chronology
| ← Previous "201" | Next → "Poor and Stupid" |
- South Park season 14

"Crippled Summer" is the seventh episode of the fourteenth season of the American animated television series South Park, and the 202nd overall episode of the series. It originally aired on Comedy Central in the United States on April 28, 2010. In the episode, the South Park children try to help Towelie overcome his drug addiction, while Nathan and his lackey Mimsy plot to destroy Jimmy during athletic competitions at a summer camp for disabled children.

The episode was written and directed by series co-creator Trey Parker, and was rated TV-MA L in the United States. The story of Towelie's addiction is presented as a parody of the reality series Intervention. Parker and fellow co-creator Matt Stone originally planned an Intervention parody around Towelie for the tenth season episode "A Million Little Fibers", but those plans were eventually scrapped. Several of the disabled children in "Crippled Summer" are made to resemble characters from the Looney Tunes cartoon series, including Elmer Fudd, Beaky Buzzard, Sylvester the Cat, Pete Puma, and Porky Pig, as well as non-Looney Tunes characters Droopy and Fat Albert.

"Crippled Summer" received positive reviews, though some commentators expressed disappointment that the episode did not respond to the controversies surrounding the show's depictions of Muhammad in the previous episodes, "200" and "201". According to Nielsen Media Research, "Crippled Summer" was seen by 3.56 million viewers, making it the most watched cable show of the night, and outperforming even some prime time network shows that evening.

== Plot ==
The drug addiction of Towelie, a living and talking towel, is growing so overwhelming that the South Park boys make attempts to help him. Towelie's history is shown, using interview clips and on-screen captions (in a parody of Intervention), starting with years of drug addiction to cannabis, crystal meth, heroin and crack. He previously had a girlfriend named Rebecca and conceived a child with her (a washcloth), but he was kicked out of their home due to his persistently getting high. Having run out of money for hard drugs, Towelie starts getting high off cans of computer duster. His life continues in a downward spiral, leaving him in heavy debt and offering oral sex to strangers for money in the alleys. The boys help him get a job at Lake Tardicaca, a summer camp for kids with physical and mental disabilities, as a towel to dry off the campers. However, Towelie persists in drug use and fellating strangers in the supply closet, and is fired by the camp. All the boys except Eric Cartman confront Towelie and plead with him to enter treatment for his addictions. Cartman instead reads a long collection of anti-Semitic remarks, infuriating Kyle Broflovski, but the interventionist allows him to continue without interruption until he is finished. Towelie refuses their pleas until Butters reveals he has brought Towelie's child, "Washcloth", which finally prompts him to accept the offer to go to a rehabilitation clinic in Rancho Palos Verdes, California. Later, Towelie reveals he has completed rehab and is now living with his girlfriend and son.

Meanwhile, at the summer camp, young bully Nathan and his dimwitted lackey Mimsy plot to sabotage Jimmy Valmer's team during the athletic competitions so Nathan can win the camp championship. This sub-plot is also narrated in the same style as Intervention. Mimsy repeatedly misunderstands Nathan's instructions, resulting in Nathan falling victim to his own sabotages: nearly being bitten by a venomous black mamba placed in his team's canoe, falling victim to an attack by a hostile native tribe living near the campsite after following the wrong map, and being anally raped by a shark that responds to a mating call whistle. During the camp talent show, Nathan rigs Jimmy's ukulele with a charge of C-4 and sets it to explode when Jimmy plays his solo. When Jimmy fails to play it correctly and skips it, Mimsy tries to show him the correct notes but cannot get it right either. An exasperated Nathan berates Mimsy for his ineptitude and plays the solo correctly (a spoof of "Believe Me, If All Those Endearing Young Charms" as used to trigger explosives in Looney Tunes cartoons), inadvertently setting off the C-4 and launching him across the campsite. He is again attacked by the snake and natives and raped by the shark before being taken to the hospital. Jimmy gives Nathan the champion's crown, but Nathan tells Jimmy he still hates him.

The episode ends with a message encouraging people who know towels in need of drug rehabilitation to visit "Restore Stephen Baldwin", a now deleted website seeking assistance for actor Stephen Baldwin.

== Production ==
"Crippled Summer" was written and directed by series co-creator Trey Parker, and it was rated TV-MA L in the United States. It originally aired on Comedy Central in the United States on April 28, 2010, and served as the mid-season finale of the fourteenth season before a months-long hiatus for the series. Parker and fellow series co-creator Matt Stone originally planned for the tenth season episode "A Million Little Fibers" to be about Towelie's struggle to overcome addiction in the style of the television series Intervention, with the children and residents of South Park coming together to help him, just as it was done in "Crippled Summer". However, after writing portions of the story for the tenth-season episode, they found they did not know where to bring the story or how to resolve it. As a result, they completely revamped the episode and focused it on talk show host Oprah Winfrey and the controversy surrounding the James Frey book A Million Little Pieces, rather than Towelie's addiction. "Crippled Summer" also marked the first appearance by Towelie since the "A Million Little Fibers", and the first appearance of Nathan, Jimmy's disabled nemesis, since the eighth season episode "Up the Down Steroid".

== Cultural references ==
"Crippled Summer" served as a parody of Intervention, the A&E Network documentary series about people struggling with various addictions. Throughout the episode, information about Towelie's drug addiction is presented on completely black screens with white letters. This device is used frequently in Intervention. The interviews with Towelie's friends and footage of their pleas to get help are also characteristic of the reality series. During one of Towelie's interviews, he quotes "feels like I'm walking on sunshine" after huffing air duster cans. Both the quote and his actions are from Season 5, episode 9 of Intervention, where they interview "Allison".

Many of the campers at Lake Tardicaca are parodies of characters from the cartoon series Looney Tunes. Nathan and Mimsy, in particular, are strongly influenced by Rocky and Mugsy, with Nathan taking on the role of the diminutive mastermind (like Rocky) who is constantly thwarted by his large but dim-witted accomplice (like Mugsy). Other characters from the summer camp in the episode resemble cartoon characters such as Elmer Fudd, Pete Puma, Droopy, Porky Pig, Taz, Foghorn Leghorn, and Beaky Buzzard.

The episode ends with a reference to "Restore Stephen Baldwin", a real-life website seeking to restore actor Stephen Baldwin's career and solicit donations to repay his $2.3 million debt. The joke compares Towelie's addiction and rehabilitation to that of Baldwin, who had a history of drug abuse before becoming a born-again Christian. A version of "Are You Ready for the Summer?", a camp theme song sung by children in the comedy film Meatballs, is featured. The episode makes reference to actress Kirstie Alley when a counselor says Towelie is the most troubled towel he had seen since Alley's towel, who he said "has seen some nasty stuff".

== Reception ==
In its original American broadcast on April 29, 2010, "Crippled Summer" was watched by 3.56 million viewers, according to Nielsen Media Research, making it the most watched cable television show of the night. It received a 2.2 rating/4 share among overall viewers and a 2.0 rating/6 share among adult viewers between ages 18 and 49. This rating marked an improvement over the previous South Park episode, "201", and outperformed those of several primetime network shows that evening, including Fox's Lie to Me, ABC's The Middle, NBC's Minute to Win It, CBS's The New Adventures of Old Christine and The CW Network's America's Next Top Model, most of which were in repeats that evening. "Crippled Summer" received a 4.1 rating/13 share among male viewers between ages 18 and 34. The episode also ranked fourth for the week among cable viewers between ages 18 and 49 and, because it ranked only behind three NBA playoff games, it was the highest-rated scripted cable show of the week. "Crippled Summer" was the highest-rated cable show among the 18–34 viewer demographic.

This is a brilliant episode. It's pure silliness, with a lot of old-school comedy devices mixed in with the usual crass South Park brand of humor.

— Ramsey Isler, IGN

"Crippled Summer" received mixed reviews. Ramsey Isler of IGN called "Crippled Summer" a brilliant episode, particularly praising the return of Towelie, who he said "has a slew of great moments in this story, making up for his long absence from the series". Isler said after the controversy raised from the depictions of Muhammad in the previous two episodes, "200" and "201", he appreciated that the show returned to a simpler plot and provided "a little comedy relief". The A.V. Club writer Josh Modell also praised South Park for "not getting too caught up in the Muhammad thing", and praised the jokes about Intervention, which he said "is one of those shows that's really easy to parody". He also praised several individual jokes, like Cartman's theories about the Jews and Nathan getting raped by a shark, although he said the Mimsy jokes were "a little one-note". Ken Tucker of Entertainment Weekly said of the episode: "Not the kind of South Park episode that’s going to stir national-news debate, but funny and vulgar enough to satisfy fans."

Carlos Delgado of iF magazine pointed out that although the episode mocked drug addicts and disabled children, it did not face the kind of censorship "200" and "201" did, which he suggested proved that censorship was born of fear rather than ethics. Delgado also said the comparison of disabled children to Looney Tunes characters "should remind us all that such cruel portrayals of disabled people have been going on for years". Others criticized the episode. MTV writer Adam Rosenberg thought the episode "just wasn't very funny", and said it missed an opportunity to continue the creative edginess demonstrated in "200" and "201". Rosenberg found the jokes about disabled children "pointlessly mean", and said the fact that they are allowed where depictions of Muhammad are censored "makes a point about the absurdity of what is and isn't TV-acceptable". The television website TV Fanatic praised the Towelie storyline and the use of his son "Washcloth", but said the jokes about the disabled children were unfunny and irritating. The site called it "by far the weakest of the season" and a disappointment following "200" and "201".

== Home media ==
"Crippled Summer", along with the thirteen other episodes from South Park's fourteenth season, were released on a three-disc DVD set and two-disc Blu-ray set in the United States on April 26, 2011.
