= A Million Little Fibers =

- South Park episode
- Episode no.: Season 10; Episode 5
- Directed by: Trey Parker
- Written by: Trey Parker
- Production code: 1005
- Original air date: April 19, 2006

Episode chronology
← Previous "Cartoon Wars Part II"	Next → "ManBearPig"
- South Park season 10

"A Million Little Fibers" is the fifth episode in the tenth season of the American animated television series South Park. The 144th episode of the series overall, it was first broadcast on Comedy Central in the United States on April 19, 2006. It is one of two episodes where neither Stan, Kyle, Cartman, or Kenny make an appearance, the other being "Pip". The episode focuses on Towelie and parodies the controversy over the book A Million Little Pieces, an infamous novelistic memoir by James Frey that was lauded by Oprah Winfrey on her talk show until it was revealed to be largely fabricated.

The episode was written and directed by series co-creator Trey Parker. It was intended as season ten's "bank episode", meaning it was partially produced in advance to allow for time off during the actual production run. However, the episode practically had to be scrapped, as it required more time than was allowed to be finished. The original plot of the episode parodied the television series Intervention. The episode received a mixed to negative critical reception.

== Plot ==
Having lost a job because he was high, Towelie decides to write his memoirs, but a publisher turns him down as uninteresting and irrelevant to the public because Towelie is a towel. He then submits the manuscript again, under the guise of a human author called Steven McTowelie, and he is accepted. Having been invited to appear on The Oprah Winfrey Show, Oprah Winfrey loves and promotes his book. Meanwhile, Oprah's vagina, Minge, is depressed that the overworked Oprah never pays attention to him any more. Gary, her anus, conspires with Minge to get Oprah fired. As Minge realizes that Towelie is not a person, they call Geraldo Rivera and give him the information. Subsequently, Towelie is interviewed on Larry King Live, during which Rivera reveals that the author of the book is a towel, and Towelie responds by calling Rivera a "beaner towel".

Mobs congregate to protest wildly; Oprah invites Towelie back on the show, saying that he can explain that he wanted to make the book more relevant and easily understandable. However, she erupts in anger and calls on the audience to lynch Towelie. As she brought the audience onto her side, Minge and Gary's plan is foiled. Just as Oprah and the crowd prepare to lynch Towelie, Minge unzips Oprah's pants and holds out a revolver. Taking hostages, he guns down a police officer and begins making demands. Towelie, using his inherent flatness, manages to free the hostages, as police open fire on Oprah, leading to the death of Gary. Distraught at his death, Minge blames Oprah for not spending time with them before turning the gun on himself and commits suicide. Oprah survives, but is still taken away to the hospital to be treated. Towelie is forgiven by everyone else and is hailed as a hero. Towelie apologizes for lying and learns that he should not get high to come up with ideas: he should come up with ideas first, and then get high as a reward.

== Production ==
According to series co-creators Trey Parker and Matt Stone, this episode was originally this season's "bank episode", meaning that it is partially animated before the start of the actual production run, which allows the staff to have one or two days off during the run. It was intended to be a spoof of the television series Intervention, with the people of South Park trying to get Towelie into rehab. About halfway into production, they decided the state of the episode, which consisted of about ten minutes of actual episode, was not good enough and needed more work than they could achieve, so they started from scratch. The finished show was completed in far less time than usual, thanks mostly to them having already taken a two-day break. The intervention storyline was dropped and later used in the season fourteen episode, "Crippled Summer". The story involving Oprah had always been in the episode.

Parker and Stone also discussed the "hat on top of a hat" scenario to describe the "weirdness" of the episode's two stories, saying that when one wears two hats, one on top of the other, they "just end up looking like an idiot" (weirdness on top of weirdness replacing the hats). In hindsight, Parker and Stone felt that the two storylines used in this episode should have been split up into two separate episodes. The title of the episode and some elements of the plot are both a reference to the James Frey book A Million Little Pieces.

== Reception ==
In his review, Eric Goldman of IGN gave the episode a score of three out of 10, mostly criticizing the way the two stories worked together, saying they would have worked better in separate episodes.

Parker and Stone consider the episode one of their worst, with Parker saying, "That did not turn out well. I had higher hopes for that. If we were going to have Oprah's butthole and vagina and the gun and everything, it should have been in a show with the boys, not the towel." Stone called the episode, "weird on top of weird with weird in the middle. I'd erase that one. I think you could take that show and split it into two different shows. But putting it together, it just feels like, 'What the fuck is this crap? Why am I watching this? I tuned in to watch South Park. I did not tune in to watch Oprah's vagina talk to her butthole and a towel.'"

== Home release ==
"A Million Little Fibers", along with the thirteen other episodes from South Park's tenth season, was released on a three-disc DVD set in the United States on August 21, 2007. The set includes brief audio commentaries by series co-creators Trey Parker and Matt Stone for each episode. It was also later released as part of a 10-disc Blu-ray set consisting of Seasons 6-10.
