= Smug Alert! =

- South Park episode
- Episode no.: Season 10; Episode 2
- Directed by: Trey Parker
- Written by: Trey Parker
- Production code: 1002
- Original air date: March 29, 2006

Guest appearance
- George Clooney as Himself

Episode chronology
← Previous "The Return of Chef"	Next → "Cartoon Wars Part I"
- South Park season 10

"Smug Alert!" is the second episode of the tenth season of the American animated television series South Park and the 141st episode of the entire series overall, it first aired on Comedy Central in the United States on March 29, 2006. In this episode, Gerald buys a hybrid car and buys into the whole progressive movement, moving his family from Park County, Colorado to San Francisco, California and disturbing a delicate equilibrium and indirectly causing an environmental disaster along the way. The episode acts as a play on the attitude of owners of hybrid cars, as well as the similarity between the words "smog" and "smug".

== Plot ==
Kyle's father Gerald buys a new hybrid car. He soon attempts to convert the other townspeople to environmentally friendly vehicles. After alienating all of his friends with his preachy attitude, he decides he cannot live in South Park any longer and moves his family to San Francisco.

After failing to convince Gerald to change his mind, Stan writes a song which convinces the entire town to purchase hybrids. Stan is later approached by Ranger McFriendly, who explains that everybody owning hybrids causes more harm than good: although emission levels are down, people who drive hybrids emit "smug", and South Park now has the second-highest levels in the country, after San Francisco.

The cloud of smug forms over South Park and begins to combine with that of San Francisco. McFriendly informs the town that a cloud of smug from George Clooney's 78th Academy Awards acceptance speech will soon drift between the two potential storms, merging them together to create a system which will heavily damage South Park and completely destroy San Francisco. Meanwhile, Cartman realizes that Butters is not a satisfying target for abuse and wishes for Kyle to return. Cartman and Butters secretly travel to San Francisco, and just as the smug storm hits, Cartman finds the Broflovskis in their house.

The storm destroys thousands of homes in South Park, and completely decimates San Francisco, convincing everyone that Kyle and his family have been killed. The Broflovskis reappear, however, unaware that their safety is due to the actions of Cartman. With all their cars destroyed, the townspeople vow never again to buy hybrids, but Kyle tells everyone that it isn't the hybrid cars that cause smug but rather the people who drive them, implying that people need to drive cars and not act like they are above all other people. The town then agrees that perhaps someday they will learn to drive hybrid cars the same way they drive normal cars but for now the technology is too much.

== Reception ==
TV Squad's Adam Finley gave the episode a positive review, noting "tons of great moments, from Stan's gay little song to Cartman being forced to don a vintage diver's suit". IGN's Eric Goldman rated the episode an 8.0 out of 10, noting in particular the "very funny" take on San Franciscans' attitude and the "hysterical plot twist" of mocking George Clooney, who had previously provided the voice of a dog in the episode "Big Gay Al's Big Gay Boat Ride", as well as a doctor in South Park: Bigger, Longer and Uncut.

== Home media ==
"Smug Alert!", along with the thirteen other episodes from South Park's tenth season, was released on a three-disc DVD set in the United States on August 21, 2007. The set includes brief audio commentaries by series co-creators Trey Parker and Matt Stone for each episode.

== See also ==
- Let's Get Together - 1960s hit song by The Youngbloods with similarity in lyrics to Stan's Hybrid Car song, repeating the theme "Come on people, now".
