= Mystery of the Urinal Deuce =

- South Park episode
- George W. Bush attempts to convince Kyle and Stan that the U.S. government was behind 9/11.
- Episode no.: Season 10; Episode 9
- Directed by: Trey Parker
- Written by: Trey Parker
- Production code: 1009
- Original air date: October 11, 2006

Guest appearance
- Maddie Taylor as George W. Bush (Note: Uncredited.)

Episode chronology
← Previous "Make Love, Not Warcraft"	Next → "Miss Teacher Bangs a Boy"
- South Park season 10

"Mystery of the Urinal Deuce" is the ninth episode in the tenth season of the American animated television series South Park. The 148th episode of the series overall, it first aired on Comedy Central in the United States on October 11, 2006. The episode focuses on the 9/11 conspiracy theories, and was written by series co-creator Trey Parker. In the episode, Mr. Mackey is determined to find out who defecated in the urinal, while Cartman manages to link it to 9/11. This causes Stan and Kyle to find the truth behind the attacks.

== Plot ==
When someone at South Park Elementary defecates in a urinal, Mr. Mackey searches for the boy responsible. When Mackey enters the classroom in a vain attempt to discern the culprit, Cartman explains that he believes it may be a conspiracy, much like 9/11. When the police decide they can provide no further assistance, they hire the "Hardly" Boys, though their unusual investigation tactics are generally perceived as ineffective. Later on, Kyle explains that he believes 9/11 conspiracies to be "retarded", though Butters claims the event was caused by George W. Bush, as informed by Cartman.

A running gag featured in the episode has Mr. Mackey attempting to solicit a confession from the boys of South Park Elementary while making unintentionally funny euphemisms (e.g. "chocolate hot dog"), causing everyone to laugh and infuriating Mr. Mackey further. He eventually attempts to point the finger at Clyde as the culprit, but is forced to retract the claim when he learns that Clyde had a colostomy at age 5: rendering him incapable of defecating on his own.

Cartman researches 9/11 online: eventually pinning the blame on Kyle during a presentation in class, where he cites Kyle's absence from school on September 11 and the fact he scored a 91 on a spelling test 12 days after the attacks as evidence. Despite the absurdity of Cartman's claims, he nonetheless convinces everyone that Kyle is guilty. Kyle enlists Stan's help, and the two leave South Park to find an organization that can prove Kyle's innocence. The group they find, however, believes that the United States government orchestrated 9/11. A SWAT team attacks and takes Kyle, Stan, and the leader of the conspiracy organization to the White House where U.S. officials, including President George W. Bush, reveal that the government really is behind 9/11. Bush appears to murder the conspiracy leader as Stan and Kyle flee, due to Dick Cheney missing the boys with his crossbow and triggering the fire alarm.

Stan and Kyle intend to travel back to South Park and tell everyone what they've learned, but as they walk along a street in Chicago, they spot the conspiracy leader, discovering that he was not actually killed. The boys chase him to a dead end, where he begs for mercy. Suddenly, a man shoots the leader and tells the boys to follow him to his house. There, he reveals that he is a detective, the father of the Hardly Boys. In the course of investigating the urinal in South Park, his sons followed "clues" (their erections) that led them to determine that the 9/11 conspiracy theories were actually spread by the government; in other words, the 9/11 conspiracy is itself a government conspiracy. President Bush and his staff appear, and after failing to persuade Kyle that they were behind 9/11, Bush explains that the government uses conspiracy theories to scare gullible citizens into believing that the government is more powerful than it really is. The Hardly father asks Bush how he knew their location. Stan points a gun to Kyle and reveals that he was the one who defecated in the urinal (his reason for doing so was that the stalls were full and he did not want to miss recess). He decided to blame the government for the urinal deuce, and the government was happy to take the blame, just as with 9/11. Kyle then asks who was truly responsible for 9/11, and Stan replies it was "a bunch of pissed-off Muslims."

Back in school, Stan is punished by being made to clean the urinal, while Mr. Mackey lectures him, unintentionally making him laugh.

== Production ==
Series co-creators Trey Parker and Matt Stone revealed the inspiration for the episode on the DVD commentary. The aspects of the story which focus on the urinal defecation are based on an identical experience Stone had in elementary school. The 9/11 aspects are based on Parker and Stone's hatred of conspiracy theories regarding 9/11. The urinal defecation story was introduced into the episode late into production, when Parker and Stone realized the episode focused almost exclusively on 9/11. Before the urinal defecation story was implemented, the episode contained a parody of Duane Chapman and the television series Dog the Bounty Hunter, which was first intended for use in the season nine episode "Die Hippie, Die", and actually used in "Miss Teacher Bangs a Boy", season ten's next episode.

The episode also refers to the Dick Cheney hunting accident, when Dick Cheney shoots at Stan and Kyle and curses himself for "missing again".

== Reception ==
IGN's Dan Iverson gave the episode a rating of 7.7 out of 10, calling it "topical and humorous". He did feel that the subplots involving the eponymous urinal deuce and the Hardly Boys were "awkward and really unfunny".
