= Miss Teacher Bangs a Boy =

- South Park episode
- Episode no.: Season 10; Episode 10
- Directed by: Trey Parker
- Written by: Trey Parker
- Production code: 1010
- Original air date: October 18, 2006

Guest appearance
- Kathryn Howell as Ms. Stevenson

Episode chronology
← Previous "Mystery of the Urinal Deuce"	Next → "Hell on Earth 2006"
- South Park season 10

"Miss Teacher Bangs a Boy" is the tenth episode in the tenth season of the American animated television series South Park. The 149th episode of the series overall, it originally aired on Comedy Central in the United States on October 18, 2006. In the episode, Cartman is appointed to the post of school hallway monitor at South Park Elementary, and takes it personally when an infraction is committed in his jurisdiction. Meanwhile, Kyle discovers that his little brother Ike is in a romantic relationship with his kindergarten teacher Miss Stevenson. Kyle and Cartman team up to put a stop to the inappropriate behavior. Written and directed by series co-creator Trey Parker, the episode features a parody of the television series Dog the Bounty Hunter.

== Plot ==
The episode begins as Eric Cartman is called into the principal's office. Although Cartman initially believes he is being punished, he is surprised to learn that it is his turn to be the school's hallway monitor: a duty he takes extremely seriously, assuming the identity of "Dawg the Hallway Monitor" (a parody of Duane "Dog" Chapman). During a shift, Cartman finds a discarded drawing by Ike Broflovski expressing a crush on kindergarten teacher Miss Stevenson (Kathryn Howell). Cartman proceeds to storm into Ike's classroom, aggressively berating the infant in front of his classmates and urging them not to litter in the hallway as Ike has. Miss Stevenson asks Ike to stay after class, wherein she admits to Ike that she loves him and the pair begin a sexual relationship, which is introduced through a montage set to REO Speedwagon's "Can't Fight This Feeling". This is disguised by Stevenson as after-school tutoring.

Kyle enters Miss Stevenson's house looking for Ike, but catches the pair together in the bathtub and proceeds to drag Ike back home. Kyle attempts to inform his parents, but Ike deliberately interrupts by babbling over his brother. Kyle anonymously tells the police that a teacher is having sex with a student, but the police are apathetic once they realize that the teacher in question is an attractive woman, going as far to claim they must "track this student down and give him his luckiest boy in America medal, right away!".

Dejected, Kyle tells his friends about the problem. They too are initially apathetic and, in fact, believe Ike to be "pretty cool" (mirroring the policemen's reactions) but Cartman becomes enraged when Kyle offhandedly mentions that Ike and Miss Stevenson are sneaking out into the hallway to kiss: which he reminds the group is "strictly against school policy". Incensed by the violation of school rules, Cartman stakes out the hallway to catch the pair in the act: macing Miss Stevenson when she attempts to get away.

Cartman brings the two to Principal Victoria's office, though reveals he is more frustrated by the fact Ike lacked a hall pass during the ordeal rather than the dubious relationship itself. At the insistence of Principal Victoria, Miss Stevenson is begrudgingly arrested by the policemen and fired from her job. She escapes a prison sentence by using the "Mel Gibson Defense," claiming she is an alcoholic and was not responsible for her actions, much to Cartman's frustration. Ike, aware that Kyle indirectly played a role in the events, disowns him as his brother when the latter attempts to explain the morally dubious nature of the former's relationship.

After a quick trip to rehab, Miss Stevenson talks Ike into fleeing with her to Milan (which the infant mistakes for the Disney film Mulan). Cartman learns they have purchased plane tickets for a flight which will depart the following morning, and searches their hotel with Kyle and his new crew, in which Cartman paid them for $15, Leroy, their assistant, Earl, their driver, and Beth, Dawg's wife. Hotel employees call the police due to the commotion they're causing. With the police now present, Miss Stevenson tries to flee with Ike. The police corner Stevenson, Ike, and Cartman's crew on the roof, though Cartman assures them that he is a hallway monitor and has the authority to perform such an operation. Miss Stevenson tries to fulfill the suicide pact she had made with Ike by hurling themselves off the roof, though Ike is dissuaded after Kyle gives an impassioned speech that Ike should enjoy his life before considering a serious relationship, while Miss Stevenson falls to her death.

Kyle thanks Cartman for assisting him, though Cartman claims he is simply satisfied that "[his] hallways are clean". Cartman then continues a video he has been producing during the episode, claiming failing to follow Christian values results in ending up like Miss Stevenson as a police officer tells him he must get off the roof. Cartman responds that he was done filming his video anyhow, as the episode ends.

== Production ==
The idea to satirize Duane "Dog" Chapman and the television series Dog the Bounty Hunter was first implemented into the season nine episode "Die Hippie, Die". It was removed entirely because series co-creators Trey Parker and Matt Stone felt that not enough viewers would understand the parody, and the idea was saved for a future episode. During the production of "Mystery of the Urinal Deuce", season ten's previous episode, the idea was brought back up and several scenes were animated. The parody was again scrapped, this time because Parker and Stone felt dissatisfied with the episode and virtually overhauled it. During production of "Miss Teacher Bangs a Boy", the idea was again brought up, and this time it would remain in the episode.

== Reception ==
Dan Iverson of IGN gave the episode a score of 8.0 out of 10, summarizing his review with: "Although some may disagree, we believe that there wasn't really anything offensive in this episode. The subject matter definitely could have swung that way, but instead the over-exaggerated satire lent the episode humor that wouldn't normally be found in the situation. We thank the creators of South Park for turning around the 10th season, as the first couple episodes weren't great, but since they came back from their hiatus it has been one good episode after another. Let's all hope that this trend continues."

Chapman reacted to this episode in his autobiography You Can Run But You Can't Hide, stating that he was very pleased with it, commenting, "You know you've really made it when they include you on their show."

== See also ==
- Female-male statutory rape
- Mary Kay Letourneau
- Pamela Rogers Turner
- Debra Lafave
- That's My Boy
