= Go God Go XII =

- South Park episode
- Richard Dawkins is revealed to have married Mrs. Garrison.
- Episode no.: Season 10; Episode 13
- Directed by: Trey Parker
- Written by: Trey Parker
- Production code: 1013
- Original air date: November 8, 2006

Episode chronology
← Previous "Go God Go"	Next → "Stanley's Cup"
- South Park season 10

"Go God Go XII" is the thirteenth episode in the tenth season of the American animated television series South Park. The 152nd episode of the series overall, it first aired on Comedy Central in the United States on November 8, 2006. Written and directed by series co-creator Trey Parker, the episode is the second in a two-part story arc, after "Go God Go".

== Plot ==
Cartman is still trapped in the year 2546, after his plan to submit himself to cryogenic suspension to avoid waiting for the release of the Nintendo Wii goes awry. In the year 2546, worldwide atheism, founded by Richard Dawkins and his wife Mrs. Garrison, has eradicated religion. Atheism has in turn split into three hostile denominations at perpetual war over the so-called "great question": the super-intelligent sea otters of the Allied Atheist Alliance (AAA), the humans of the United Atheist Alliance (UAA), and a rival human faction, the Unified Atheist League (UAL). Cartman is considered a valuable asset by all three groups.

Cartman manages to obtain a Wii from a museum. However, he learns that the Wii is incompatible with viewing screens of the 26th century. He decides to use a "Time Phone" to call the past and thereby prevent his self-freezing plan from ever happening. Although Cartman successfully uses the Time Phone to call several people in the past including himself, they all hang up on him, and thus the attempt to prevent his do-it-yourself cryonics experiment fails.

A massive battle between the three atheist groups begins, during which Cartman discovers the nature of the "great question": the war is being fought over which denomination name is the most logical for atheists to call themselves. Cartman desperately tries again to call the past, and this time interrupts sex between Garrison and Dawkins, who picks up the phone. As a result, Dawkins learns from Cartman that Ms. Garrison is actually a post-op transsexual, prompting him to end the relationship.

Now that the two are no longer destined to marry, the future is altered significantly. Cartman suddenly finds himself in a room with members of all three factions, who live in peace with each other. Cartman is sent back to the 21st century. However, he is sent back to two months before the Wii's release, rather than three weeks. He receives a phone call from a future Cartman, warning him to not freeze himself, but he dismisses it as a prank call from Kyle.

== Production ==
"Go God Go XII" is intentionally unusually titled as a reference to the montage at the beginning of the episode.

== Reception ==
IGN's Dan Iverson gave the episode a positive review, with a score of 9.0 out of 10, summarizing with: "Even though it wasn't as funny as the episode before it, ["Go God Go XII"] more than made up for any lack of laughs with a massive intertwining story. By having the story go full circle with Cartman ending up where he started, and even starting back on the path he first took (having Cartman contemplate freezing himself again was hilarious) was a genius take on the character. So, with an incredible story, clever humor and multiple sci-fi references we can't help but highly recommend watching [the two episodes.]"

Richard Dawkins reacted to his depiction in the two episodes by saying, "I'm buggered if I like being portrayed as a cartoon character buggering a bald transvestite. I wouldn't have minded so much if only it had been in the service of some serious point, but if there was a serious point in there I couldn't discern it." When asked about the episode in a 2012 interview with Playboy magazine, Dawkins, who said it was the only episode of South Park he had seen, thought the future war among the different atheists sects, which he felt had "a certain amount of truth in it", harbored a greater potential for satire, as it reminded him of the Judean People's Front and the People's Front of Judea from the film Monty Python’s Life of Brian, but felt that too much of the episode was devoted to ridiculing him by depicting him having sex with Ms. Garrison, commenting, "That isn't satire because it has nothing to do with what I stand for. And the scatological part, where they had somebody throwing shit, which stuck to my forehead—that’s not even funny."
