= Stanley's Cup =

- South Park episode
- Episode no.: Season 10; Episode 14
- Directed by: Trey Parker
- Written by: Trey Parker
- Production code: 1014
- Original air date: November 15, 2006

Guest appearance
- Dante Alexander as Nelson Brown

Episode chronology
← Previous "Go God Go XII"	Next → "With Apologies to Jesse Jackson"
- South Park season 10

"Stanley's Cup" is the fourteenth and final episode in the tenth season of the American animated television series South Park. The 153rd episode of the series overall, it originally aired on Comedy Central in the United States on November 15, 2006. In the episode, Stan is forced to become the coach of a pee-wee hockey team. Written and directed by series co-creator Trey Parker, the episode parodies the 1992 film The Mighty Ducks and BASEketball.

In the episode, Stan's bike is towed, and he can't do his job as a paperboy. The only way of getting his bike back is to coach a pee-wee hockey team. Similar to Cartmanland, the health of a character is affected by others' fortune or misfortune.

== Plot ==
Stan's bicycle is towed away and impounded for parking violations. To reacquire it, he is forced to become the coach of a pee-wee hockey team. As coach, he quickly runs into a whole host of problems in dealing with the small boys. One of the boys, Nelson, has cancer, which has already spread to his bone marrow. When he takes a turn for the worse, he asks Stan to win a game for him. However, neither team is capable of scoring and the game ends in a tie. Subsequently, Nelson's cancer remains in limbo - his health is neither improving nor getting worse. Looking for a chance to win, Stan persuades Kyle to allow his adopted brother Ike to play as a ringer due to him being Canadian. Kyle reluctantly agrees despite his mother disapproving of hockey being a dangerous sport. In the meantime, Stan's father Randy is tormented that his son returned to hockey after he failed to win a game when he was in pee-wee hockey, although Stan barely remembers it.

The team is invited to play at the Pepsi Center, with the same premise — if Stan's team wins, Nelson will have enough hope to survive. When they get to the Pepsi Center to play in the intermission of an NHL professional hockey game between the Colorado Avalanche and Detroit Red Wings, the other team does not show up, and Stan worries that since they cannot play, it could result in Nelson's death. Attempting to console the boys, the Avalanche let the pee-wee team play the final period of their game against the Red Wings. The Red Wings unleash a vicious assault on the boys and go on to win, 32–2. Nelson dies in the hospital and the Red Wings celebrate their victory to the song "We Are the Champions", while Stan looks on dumbfounded at this turn of events and Randy is once again upset that his son lost.

== Production ==
Trey Parker and Matt Stone revealed that "Stanley's Cup" started off as a "bank episode," an episode which is partially produced in advance at the start of the season for use towards the end of the season to allow for rest during the run. However, whenever Parker and Stone wanted to finish the "banked" episode, they found it increasingly difficult to do so. Because of the dissatisfaction with the episode, it was not finished until they were forced to work on it: at the end of the production run with one episode left to be produced. Because the second half of season ten did not feature a true "bank episode," and thus did not allow for extra time off, Parker and Stone described the run as being an extremely difficult one to complete. Stone compared it to child birth, while Parker thought their struggles to finish production on the season could have resulted in the show ultimately being cancelled.

For the commentary of the final version, Matt and Trey, both find the ending to be very comical, after several weeks of production struggle and describe it as "a really happy ending for the other person's story," but it is polarizing amongst fans.

== Reception ==
Despite the episode being mostly well received by critics, "Stanley's Cup" is a relatively unpopular episode amongst fans of the series. Originally, the creators, exhausted by making the previous six episodes were so worn out while making this, they had no idea where to go with it. The ending for this episode was thought of at the last second and although they thought it was funny, they could see why many didn’t like it.

According to Parker and Stone, "a lot of people didn't get that one. We thought the ending was really sweet and weird, but nobody really got it." Stone said the episode "is like three-quarters of a show, but the ending is fucking sweet."

Dan Iverson of IGN gave the episode a positive review, with a score of 9.1 out of 10, writing: "With the hilarious satire, and the parody of a well known movie genre we couldn't help but love this episode. Even though it featured sports as the theme, it wasn't any funnier for those who played hockey as a kid, but could be enjoyed by anybody that has seen this type of film. The only problem that we had with the episode was the disregard for Steve Irwin's death. South Park has never had any problems making fun of taboo topics, but it just felt like it is too soon to make these comments."
