= Go God Go =

- South Park episode
- Mrs. Garrison places a dunce cap on Stan for suggesting that God could exist.
- Episode no.: Season 10; Episode 12
- Directed by: Trey Parker
- Written by: Trey Parker
- Production code: 1012
- Original air date: November 1, 2006

Episode chronology
← Previous "Hell on Earth 2006"	Next → "Go God Go XII"
- South Park season 10

"Go God Go" is the twelfth episode in the tenth season of the American animated television series South Park. The 151st episode of the series overall, it originally aired on Comedy Central in the United States on November 1, 2006. The episode is the first in a two-part story arc, which concludes with "Go God Go XII".

In "Go God Go", Cartman is unable to wait the three weeks until the Wii video game console is released, and attempts to freeze himself to get closer to the release date, but accidentally ends up much later in the future, in the atheistic world of 2546. Meanwhile, Ms. Garrison is forced to teach evolution to her students.

The episode was written and directed by South Park co-creator Trey Parker. The episode is a satire on the condescending tone of atheist books like The God Delusion, and it mocks evolutionary biologist Richard Dawkins. The two-part episode also uses religious wars to ridicule atheism.

== Plot ==
Cartman is unable to wait three weeks until the Wii console is released. In an attempt to enter cryonic suspension, he buries himself in the snow at the top of Mount Elbert, with help from Butters. Concurrently, Ms. Garrison resists being forced to teach the school's evolution curriculum. In response, the school hires evolutionary biologist Richard Dawkins to present the evolution lesson. After some initial friction between the creationist Garrison and atheist Dawkins, a romantic interest soon develops. During their date, Dawkins refers to religion as an argument from ignorance, and Garrison announces that she is now an atheist. The two later have sex, and Garrison pushes Dawkins to the realization it is his duty to rid the world of religion and bring about peace with its abolition. Garrison begins to admonish students who express a belief in God, mocking that they likely believe in the Flying Spaghetti Monster.

By this time, Cartman has begun freezing to death, but a freak avalanche buries his body, keeping him in suspended animation. Butters (in the middle of yet another run as Professor Chaos) is informed by Dougie (General Disarray) that Cartman would be considered dead even if he did successfully freeze himself, causing Butters to freak out and believe he killed him. Cartman ultimately remains frozen for over five centuries, until being discovered and revived by members of the Unified Atheist League (UAL). In the year 2546, the entire world is atheistic and dedicated to rationality and science. However, atheism is divided into several denominations, and these factions are at war with each other over who has the right answer to "the great question".

Cartman is informed of the possible presence of a Nintendo Wii at the Museum of Technology in New New Hampshire. However, they mention that before they are willing to take him there, they require some information alluding to a person they believe he knew in his time: the founder of the UAL who helped initiate a great event that made the entire world atheist. Suddenly, the UAL comes under attack from a rival group, the United Atheist Alliance (UAA), and Cartman is taken captive aboard a UAA ship.

The UAA commander contacts yet another faction, the Allied Atheist Allegiance (AAA), who are made up solely of highly evolved sea otters. The Commander of the UAA boasts to the otters about their possession of Cartman, and of how because of this, they are now the atheists in control. This provokes a threatening response from the AAA.

== Production ==
Series co-creators Trey Parker and Matt Stone described the production of "Go God Go" and "Go God Go XII" as "painful", mainly because of how it deals with atheism. They spoke about how difficult it is to make such a subject humorous without seeming "preachy". The creators decided the episode actually did end up feeling "preachy" because too many ideas and statements were present. To rectify this, large portions of the episodes that more reflected Parker and Stone's personal opinions were removed and replaced with less serious material.

The decision to do an episode with the theme of atheism was finalized when Penn Jillette emailed Parker and Stone expressing his disappointment in finding out that they are not atheists themselves. Parker and Stone's religion was questioned in an interview, which prompted Jillette's email. It was assumed that they were atheists, so in the interview they clarified that they were not strictly atheists, although Stone has since stated that he is an atheist. While this was happening, Parker was anticipating the release of the Wii, so it was decided that this scenario would also be a theme in the episode.

At the end of "Go God Go", Cartman is sent to the future; Parker and Stone loved the idea, in part because it presented the opportunity for easy-to-write material. However, they had essentially forced themselves to create another episode, which they partially disliked because it meant they'd have to write more material concerning atheism when they felt they had done enough.

Several aspects of both "Go God Go" and "Go God Go XII" pay homage to Buck Rogers in the 25th Century, a science fiction adventure television series produced by Universal Studios. Richard Dawkins and his book The God Delusion is also parodied. Parker and Stone were very pleased with the work of the animation staff in regards to the designs of the scenes in the future, particularly praising them for accomplishing so much in the short amount of time that a South Park episode is produced.

== Reception ==
=== Critical response ===
Dan Iverson of IGN gave the episode a positive review, with a score of 9.0 out of 10, writing: "Between the shocking Mrs. Garrison story and the hilarious Wii promotion by Cartman, we totally recommend watching this episode."

=== Nintendo ===
The week of November 5, 2006, a poll on Nintendo.com asked: "How bad do you want a Wii?". The responses were "Bad", "Way Bad", and "Worse than Cartman", with the third choice receiving 80% of the votes. At Nintendo's 2007 Electronic Entertainment Expo press conference, a clip of the episode where Cartman tells his mother he must have a Wii was included in a montage of clips about the demand for the Wii. Nintendo also sent the South Park staff several free Wii consoles after the episode first aired.

=== Richard Dawkins' response ===
Richard Dawkins was critical of his depiction in the two-parter episodes.

Richard Dawkins reacted to the two-part episode by saying: "I'm buggered if I like being portrayed as a cartoon character buggering a bald transvestite. I wouldn't have minded so much if only it had been in the service of some serious point, but if there was a serious point in there I couldn't discern it." In a Q&A session at the Free Library of Philadelphia, Dawkins said: "I would have thought they could at least have got an actor that could do a proper British accent. Now, if only I could be offered a cameo role in The Simpsons, I could show that actor how to do a real British accent." Dawkins later made a cameo in The Simpsons episode "Black Eyed, Please".

When asked about the episode in a 2012 interview with Playboy magazine, Dawkins, who said it was the only episode of South Park he had seen, thought the fighting among the different atheist sects had "a certain amount of truth in it" and harbored a greater potential for satire. It reminded him of the Judean People's Front and the People's Front of Judea from the film Monty Python’s Life of Brian, but he felt that too much of the episode was devoted to ridiculing him by depicting him having sex with Ms. Garrison. He commented, "That isn't satire because it has nothing to do with what I stand for. And the scatological part, where they had somebody throwing shit, which stuck to my forehead—that’s not even funny."
