= South Park season 10 =

Season of television series

South Park
- Season 10
- Home media release cover
- No. of episodes: 14

Release
- Original network: Comedy Central
- Original release: March 22 – November 15, 2006

Season chronology
- ← Previous; Season 9 Next → Season 11

The tenth season of South Park, an American animated television series created by Trey Parker and Matt Stone, began airing on March 22, 2006. The tenth season concluded after 14 episodes on November 15, 2006. This is the last season featuring Isaac Hayes (the voice of Chef) as Hayes quit the show following the backlash behind season nine's "Trapped in the Closet" episode. This season also had a minor controversy when the Halloween episode "Hell on Earth 2006" depicted The Crocodile Hunter's Steve Irwin with a stingray lodged in his chest getting thrown out of Satan's Halloween party for not being in costume. All the episodes in this season were written and directed by Trey Parker.

This season is also home to the episode, "Make Love, Not Warcraft", which won the Primetime Emmy Award for Outstanding Animated Program (for Programming Less Than One Hour) in 2007. The season also features the two-part episodes "Cartoon Wars Part I" & II, which involved Family Guy trying to air an image of the Islamic prophet Muhammad, and "Go God Go" which involved a future world where there was no religion. The season was listed as one of the 20 Best Seasons of the Last 20 Years by Pajiba.

The events of season 10 were featured in the mobile game South Park 10: The Game, released March 28, 2007.

== Episodes ==
| No. overall | No. in season | Title | Directed by | Written by | Original release date | Prod. code | Viewers (millions) |
|---|---|---|---|---|---|---|---|
| 140 | 1 | "The Return of Chef" | Trey Parker | Trey Parker | March 22, 2006 | 1001 | 3.49 |
After a 3-month departure, Chef returns to South Park, but the boys notice that he isn't the same friend he used to be.
| 141 | 2 | "Smug Alert!" | Trey Parker | Trey Parker | March 29, 2006 | 1002 | 3.38 |
Stan persuades everyone in town to buy hybrid cars so Kyle and his family will come back to South Park, not realizing the new cars cause a different kind of dangerous emission which ends in a climatic finish in the midsts of San Francisco.
| 142 | 3 | "Cartoon Wars Part I" | Trey Parker | Trey Parker | April 5, 2006 | 1003 | 3.02 |
The town is in panic when the FOX animated sitcom Family Guy angers the Muslim world by attempting to air an image of Mohammed, leading to Kyle and Cartman fighting over whether or not the show should stay on the air.
| 143 | 4 | "Cartoon Wars Part II" | Trey Parker | Trey Parker | April 12, 2006 | 1004 | 3.49 |
Cartman meets with the president of FOX in an attempt to cancel Family Guy and discovers the real writers behind the show. Meanwhile, the people of South Park bury their heads in sand pits to avoid watching the latest controversial episode of Family Guy and getting their town bombed.
| 144 | 5 | "A Million Little Fibers" | Trey Parker | Trey Parker | April 19, 2006 | 1005 | 2.68 |
In a parody of James Frey's A Million Little Pieces controversy, Towelie disguises himself as a man and publishes his dubiously written memoirs. Meanwhile, Oprah's vagina and anus try to escape from the media mogul, who has been neglecting them.
| 145 | 6 | "ManBearPig" | Trey Parker | Trey Parker | April 26, 2006 | 1006 | 2.72 |
Al Gore gets the boys trapped in Cave of the Winds while trying to kill the purported "Manbearpig". While in the cave, Cartman finds treasure that he attempts to steal.
| 146 | 7 | "Tsst" | Trey Parker | Trey Parker | May 3, 2006 | 1007 | 2.88 |
Cartman's mom calls upon a dog trainer (Cesar Millan) to keep her son from misbehaving, which changes Cartman's personality.
| 147 | 8 | "Make Love, Not Warcraft" | Trey Parker | Trey Parker | October 4, 2006 | 1008 | 3.40 |
The boys dedicate their lives to defeating a mad gamer and saving the World of Warcraft.
| 148 | 9 | "Mystery of the Urinal Deuce" | Trey Parker | Trey Parker | October 11, 2006 | 1009 | 2.95 |
Stan and Kyle "discover" the true culprits behind the September 11 attacks, while Mr. Mackey is determined to find out who defecated in the boys' room urinal at South Park Elementary.
| 149 | 10 | "Miss Teacher Bangs a Boy" | Trey Parker | Trey Parker | October 18, 2006 | 1010 | 2.50 |
Cartman is appointed the school's hall monitor, and becomes an elementary school version of Dog, the Bounty Hunter. Meanwhile, an attractive kindergarten teacher has an affair with Kyle's brother, Ike.
| 150 | 11 | "Hell on Earth 2006" | Trey Parker | Trey Parker | October 25, 2006 | 1011 | 2.96 |
Satan throws a Halloween party, which turns into an episode of MTV's My Super Sweet 16. Meanwhile, the boys summon Biggie Smalls through a Bloody Mary-type ritual, and Butters is forced to get him to the Halloween party in time.
| 151 | 12 | "Go God Go" | Trey Parker | Trey Parker | November 1, 2006 | 1012 | 3.25 |
In the first half of a two-part special, Mrs. Garrison objects to teaching evolution in science class, and Richard Dawkins is sent to help her. Meanwhile, Cartman buries himself in snow in an attempt to freeze himself until the day the Wii console is released.
| 152 | 13 | "Go God Go XII" | Trey Parker | Trey Parker | November 8, 2006 | 1013 | 3.53 |
Concluding the duology, Cartman, frozen in the snow for over 500 years, awakens in the future, only to be caught up in a war between atheists. Cartman attempts to escape the future by making contact with his past self.
| 153 | 14 | "Stanley's Cup" | Trey Parker | Trey Parker | November 15, 2006 | 1014 | 2.94 |
Stan must coach a Mighty Ducks-style pee-wee ice hockey team to victory in order to pay off his impounded bicycle and save the life of a dying child.

== See also ==
- South Park (Park County, Colorado)
- South Park City
