= Cartoon Wars Part I =

- South Park episode
- Episode no.: Season 10; Episode 3
- Directed by: Trey Parker
- Written by: Trey Parker
- Production code: 1003
- Original air date: April 5, 2006

Episode chronology
← Previous "Smug Alert!"	Next → "Cartoon Wars Part II"
- South Park season 10

"Cartoon Wars Part I" is the third episode in the tenth season of the American animated television series South Park. The 142nd episode of the series overall, it first aired on Comedy Central in the United States on April 5, 2006. It is the first part of a two-episode story-arc, which concludes with "Cartoon Wars Part II". In the episode, it is announced that a Family Guy episode will air with the Islamic prophet Muhammad as a character, leaving the whole of the United States fearing retaliatory acts from Islamic extremists due to the offensive nature of the episode. Cartman travels to Hollywood to try to get the episode pulled.

The episode was written by series co-creator Trey Parker. Parker and fellow series co-creator Matt Stone originally planned for this episode to be the first of season ten, but disagreements with Comedy Central regarding the depiction of Muhammad forced them to postpone it until later in the season. Once production on the episode began, the dispute still had not been resolved, so it was decided that the story would be split into two separate episodes to allow for more negotiations between the two sides. A similar story-arc was used in the season fourteen episodes "200" and "201".

When the series was transferred to HBO Max in 2020, it was announced that "Cartoon Wars Part I" and "Cartoon Wars Part II" would be among the five episodes not included, along with "Super Best Friends", "200," and "201," all of which feature Muhammad as a character.

== Plot ==
The townspeople of South Park are in a panic late one night when they discover that a cartoon is going to show an episode featuring Muhammad as a character. Everyone hides in the Community Center for fear of an Islamic terrorist attack and Randy announces that the cartoon is Family Guy. The next morning, everyone is thrilled to find out that there was no attack and that Fox censored the image of Muhammad at the last minute.

Kyle, Stan, Kenny, and Cartman venture to Kyle's house to watch the episode of Family Guy. The scene in question features the Family Guy cast sitting in the living room discussing Lois Griffin's embarrassment after Peter invites his ex-girlfriend to dinner, interspersed with a variety of cutaway gags: such as Peter auditioning to be David Hasselhoff's car in Knight Rider and Peter selling pancakes to Captain Kirk. At Peter's suggestion that Lois prepare tea for their guest, Brian reminds the family of an instance in which Peter and Muhammad purchased a glass of "Mr. T Tea" together from the eponymous actor. The boys are perplexed, as they are bewildered the scene could be seen as offensive. An agitated Cartman declares the clip is "not cool", though the group is largely unconvinced of his outrage.

The other boys question Cartman, stating that his offensive sense of humor is similar to the sensibilities of Family Guy, though Cartman defends himself by claiming that he is simply one young boy, while Family Guy is a cartoon watched by millions. Furthermore he questions if Kyle would be comfortable if a television program made similarly offensive jokes towards the Jewish religion, before storming off. Kyle's father Gerald then enters, and smashes the television with a baseball bat, as his mother Sheila scolds the boys for watching the program before suggesting they attend "Muslim sensitivity training".

The following day at school, Mrs. Garrison lectures the class on the Muslim religion, explaining that Muslims are upset due to the religion's prohibition of pre-marital sex and masturbation, and that they typically inhabit arid regions filled with sand. She suggests that Muslims are acting out of sexual frustration and jealousy towards the West, which morphs into anger when "some cartoon comes along from a country where people are getting laid and mocks [their] prophet!"

Cartman retorts, calling Garrison's lecture "ignorant and racist", claiming Muslims are mad because of Family Guy: not their inability to masturbate. Students are then summoned to the school gymnasium, where it is revealed that the episode was a two-parter, and that part two will air the following week without censorship. Cartman reiterates that the episode is degrading to Muslims, declaring that Fox was right to censor Muhammad. Kyle believes that Fox was wrong to censor the Family Guy staff, until Cartman gives an impassioned speech about keeping people from getting hurt. Kyle is guilt-ridden and agrees to go with Cartman to Hollywood after a nightmare wherein his younger brother Ike is lured to an ice cream shop before being killed by terrorists. Kyle and Cartman set off to Los Angeles the following morning.

The people of South Park, meanwhile, decide to literally bury their heads in the sand, so as to show Islamists that they have no part in observing the parodic depiction of Muhammad. On the way to Hollywood, Kyle discovers that Cartman is unconcerned with the Muslims' plight, and furthermore only wants to get Family Guy cancelled as a way to alleviate himself of the comparisons made by peers between his brand of offensive humor and that of Family Guy. Cartman further laments the show's random and interchangeable jokes with little if any relevance to ongoing plot elements. Cartman decides to go at it alone, but Kyle insists he will not let that happen. The two start racing one another on their Big Wheels, with Kyle losing to Cartman and being left behind.

U.S. President George W. Bush meets with the Fox executives. The Fox president says that there is something secret about the Family Guy writers that Bush needs to know, leaving the episode on a cliffhanger to be concluded in the next episode.

== Production ==
In the DVD commentaries for season ten, series co-creators Trey Parker and Matt Stone spoke about how they experienced difficulties with Comedy Central during the production of "Cartoon Wars Part I" and "Cartoon Wars Part II". They originally wanted to open season ten with these episodes, but were forced to postpone them until later in the season, due to Comedy Central not approving of the depiction of Muhammad. Instead, the season opened with "The Return of Chef", after one of the show's former actors, Isaac Hayes, released a statement bad-mouthing South Park over a previous dispute. Even as Parker and Stone continued to work on "Cartoon Wars", the dispute between them and the network had still not been resolved. As a result, the plot was developed into a two-part story-arc to allow for more negotiations between the two sides.

During the episode's audio commentary, Parker and Stone also clarified their opinions on Family Guy; Parker stated: "we do hate it [...] we understand that people love it [...] we certainly don't think it should be taken off the air [...] we just don't respect it in terms of writing". This is re-enforced within the episode itself by both the subtitles beneath Ayman al-Zawahiri, which describe how "The jokes are all interchangeable and usually irrelevant to the plot.", and Cartman who claims that Family Guy simply "has one interchangeable joke after another" rather than a traditional narrative structure. The two later referred to the writers behind the show as "smart" but emphatically criticized their overuse of "gag-humor". After "Cartoon Wars Part I" aired, Parker and Stone said that they were contacted by the staff of The Simpsons and King of the Hill, who both gave praise for lampooning Family Guy. Parker said that the staff of The Simpsons hate Family Guy more than they do, and that King of the Hill's staff said to them, "you're doing God's work". The depictions of Bart Simpson and King of the Hill's writing staff in "Cartoon Wars Part II" were influenced by the two shows contacting South Park. Parker and Stone also expressed a level of disappointment with how the episode was received; they felt that people ignored the scope of the Muhammad plot elements and found that more trivial aspects of the show received more attention than they deserved.

The season fourteen episodes "200" and "201" also feature a story-arc involving depictions of Muhammad and censorship in general. Like "Cartoon Wars Part I" and "Cartoon Wars Part II", "200" and particularly "201" caused a large amount of controversy.

== Reception ==
Eric Goldman of IGN gave the episode a 7.0 out of 10, praising the depiction of Family Guy and the cliffhanger ending. In an article a part of a series analyzing television episodes that "exemplify the spirit of [their] time and the properties that make television a unique medium", The A.V. Club's Noel Murray praised the episode, citing it and "Cartoon Wars Part II" as a good example of Parker and Stone's ability to satirize various forms of media and still be able to write quality episodes despite a large amount of controversy. Seth MacFarlane, creator of Family Guy, called the episode "funny and accurate."

== Home media ==
"Cartoon Wars Part I", along with the thirteen other episodes from South Park's tenth season, was released on a three-disc DVD set in the United States on August 21, 2007. The set includes brief audio commentaries by series co-creators Trey Parker and Matt Stone for each episode. "Cartoon Wars Part I" was also released as part of The Cult of Cartman, a 2008 DVD compilation of Cartman-centric episodes.

== See also ==
- Criticism of Family Guy
- Jyllands-Posten Muhammad cartoons controversy
