= Cave of the Winds (Colorado) =

Cave in Colorado, United States

Coordinates: 38.8725°N 104.920°W

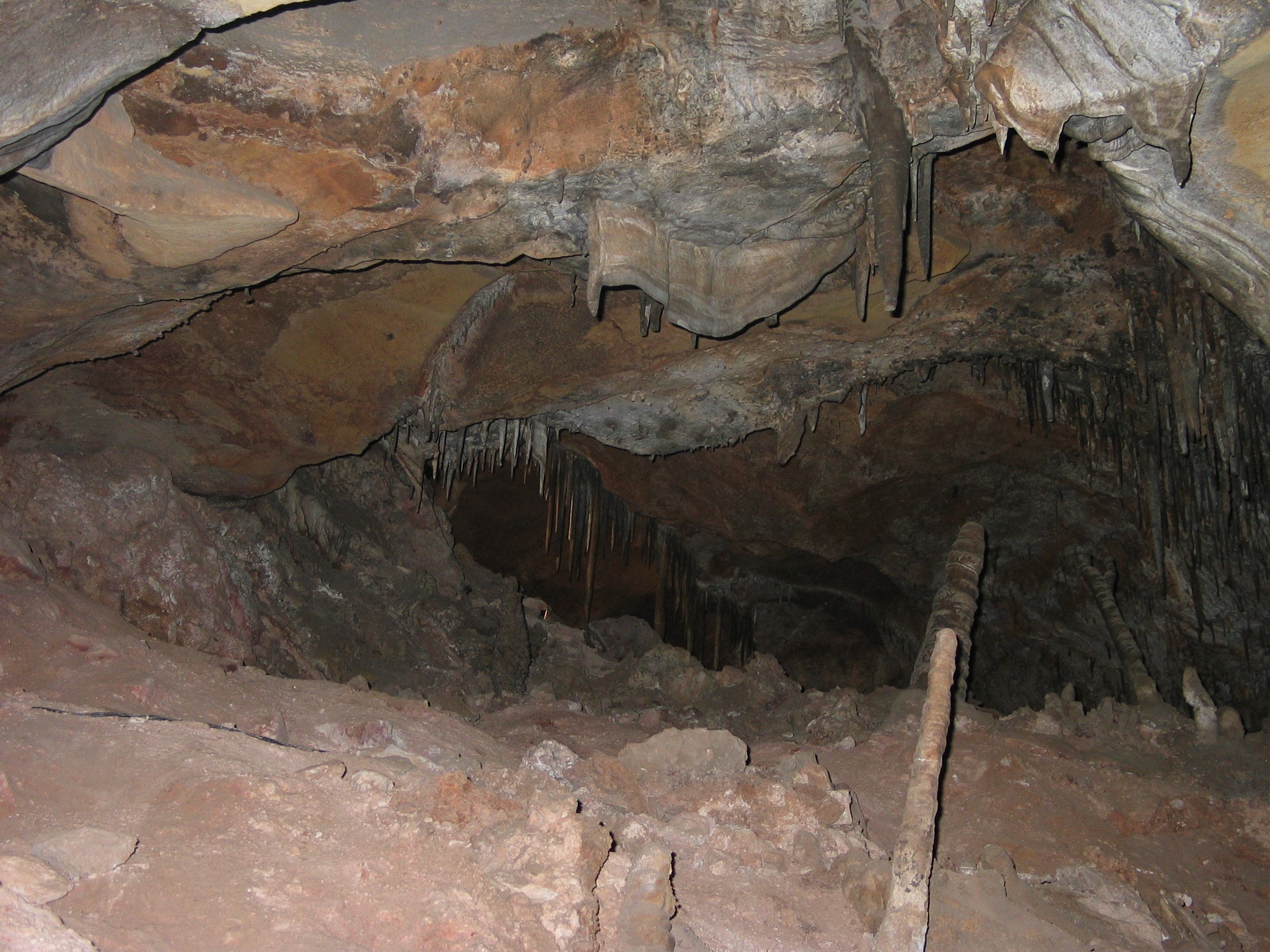
Speleothems inside the cave

Cave of the Winds is a cave in the Pikes Peak region of Colorado. It is located just west of Colorado Springs on U.S. Highway 24, near the Manitou Cliff Dwellings. Tours of the complex of caves are given daily.

== Cave features ==
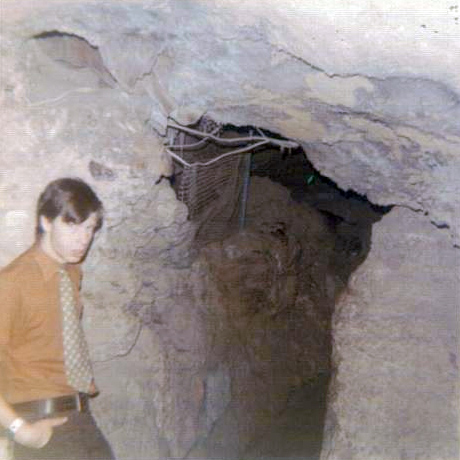
A tour guide leads a party of visitors through Cave of the Winds (May 1972).

By far the most famous section of the Cave of the Winds is the Silent Splendor room. Discovered in 1984, the room contains numerous rare crystalline speleothems including helictites. This room is sealed from public view by an "environmental gate" with a large tube that seals in moisture to maintain the atmosphere necessary for the delicate formations to continue to grow.

In the late 1980s, a few new passages were opened inside the cavern. On May 8, 1988, a new room named the "Adventure Room" was discovered.

Other lesser known attractions include a "bottomless pit", often the scene of practical jokes by the guides. The site also features a free-fall amusement ride called the Terror-Dactyl.

== History ==
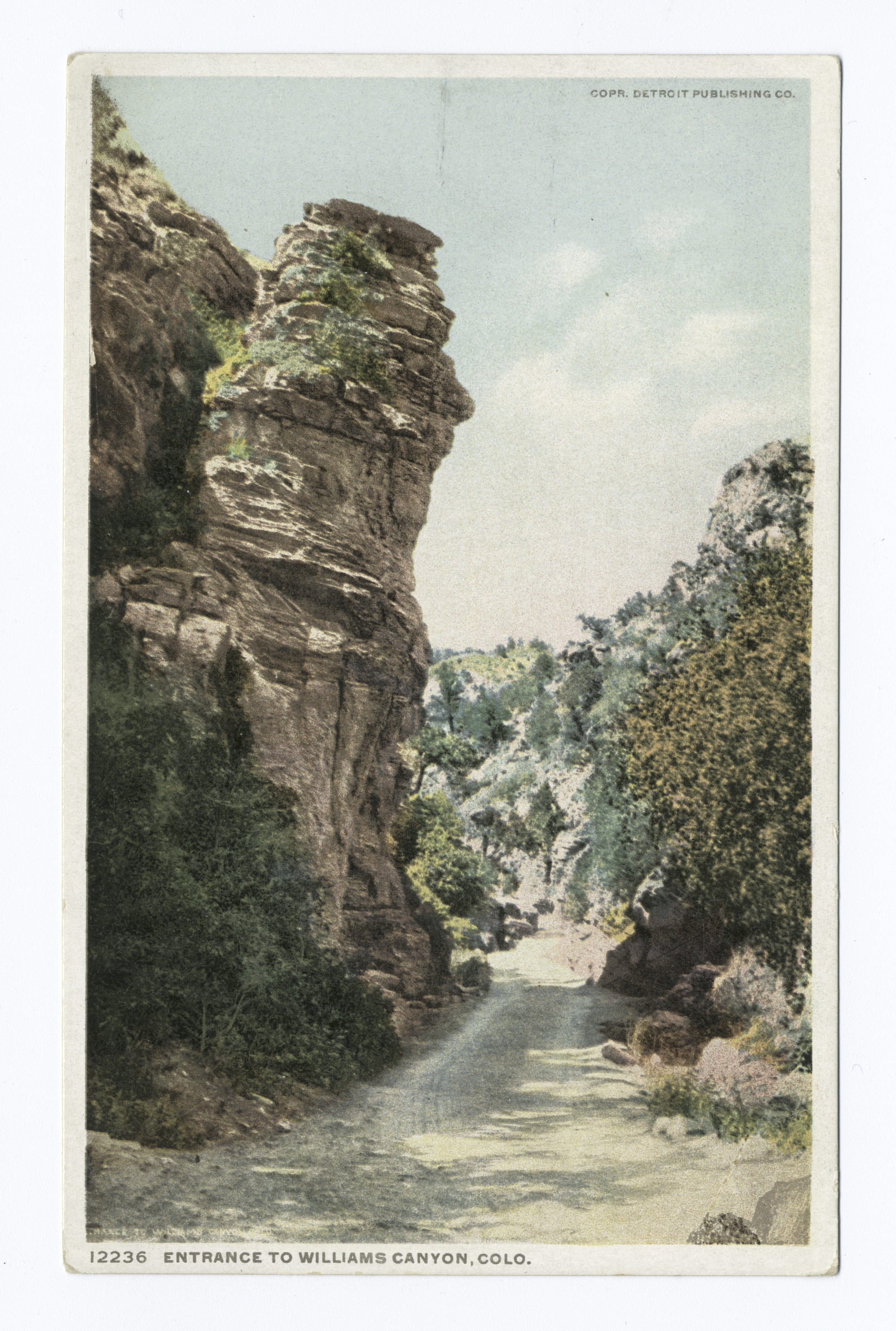
"Entrance to Williams Canyon" Postcard -- 1908-1909.

It is believed that both Apache and Ute Native Americans knew about the cave. The name, Cave of the Winds, relates to a legend involving the Apache, who were said to believe the cave was the home of a Great Spirit of the Wind.

The first documented mention of the cave came in 1880 when two brothers, John and George Pickett, discovered the cave during a hike in Williams Canyon led by the Rev. Roselle T. Cross, pastor of the Congregational Church in Colorado Springs. The boys noticed that their candles flickered in a small shelter cave they had found and wind was seen to be blowing from a nearby crevice. Crawling through the opening they emerged into a large chamber. Within a few days, Cross wrote about the discovery of the cave in his church newsletter and his story was immediately reprinted in the Colorado Springs Gazette of July 2, 1880.

The Colorado Encyclopedia relates: "Although Cross exaggerated the heights and depths of vertical elements, as do most inexperienced cavers, his account is remarkably free of the florid Victorian hyperbole typical of most cave descriptions of that time. Cross and his Boys’ Exploring Association explored most of the horizontal passages accessible from the original entrance, a distance of about 200 feet—a respectable distance for schoolboys using candles."

== Tourist attraction ==
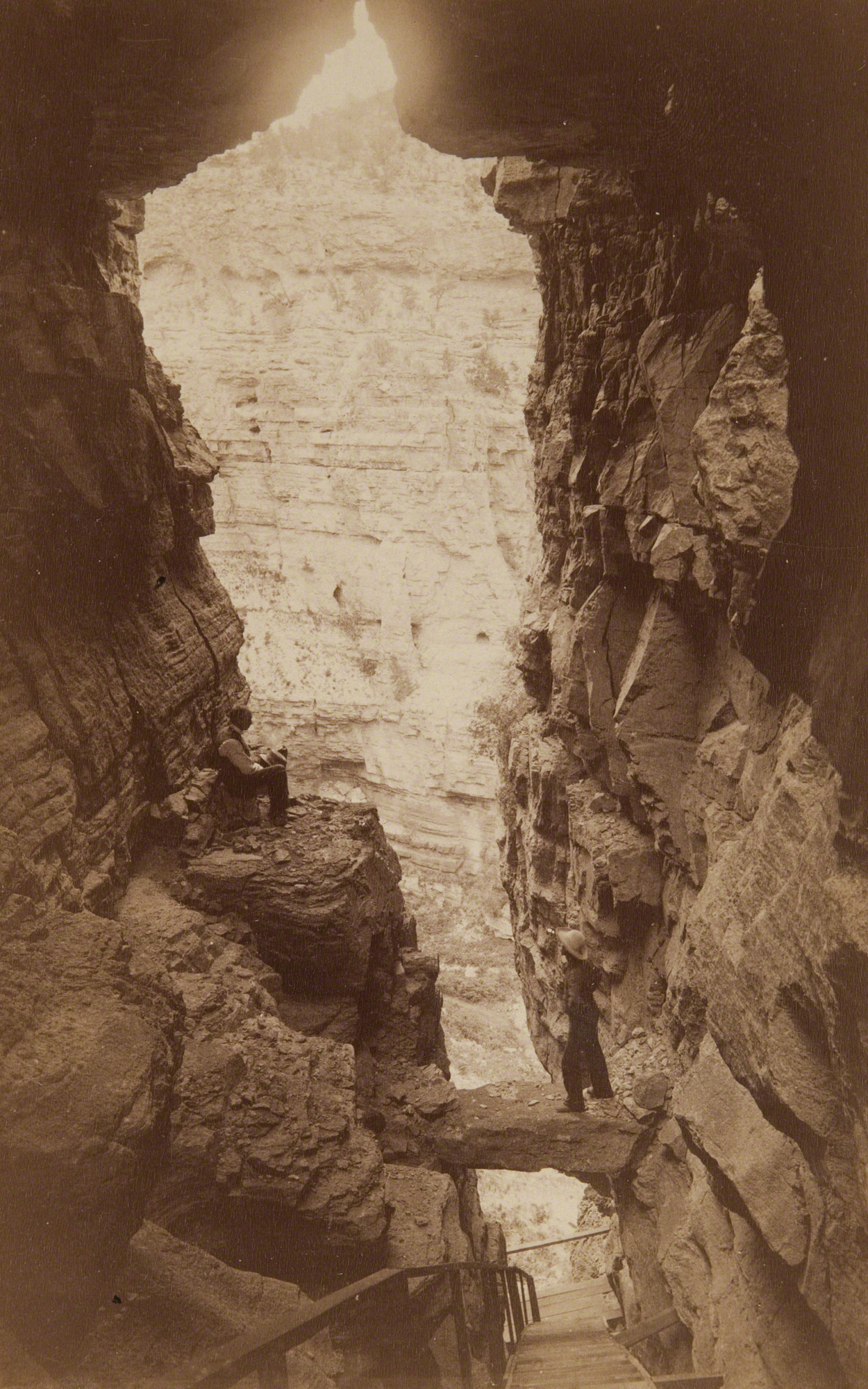
Entrance to Cave of the Winds by W. H. Jackson ~ circa 1883-1890

In 1880, the same year that the cave was discovered, George Washington Snider, a stonecutter from Ohio who had traveled to Colorado seeking his fortune visited the cave. Snider excavated passages from the Williams Canyon caves, as they were then called, and discovered "Canopy Hall" -- a large room nearly 200 feet long containing thousands of stalactites and stalagmites.. Snider wrote, “It was as though Aladdin with his wonderful lamp had effected the magic result." Unfortunately Snider spoke of his discovery in town and the next day the cave was mobbed by townspeople who stripped the cavern of many of the stalactites.

Snider continued to excavate and began preparations for guided tours. The Cave of the Winds quickly became one of the established attractions of the young Manitou resort area. Cave of the Winds has been in continuous operation since 1881 – making it one of Colorado’s oldest visitor attractions. Electrical lights were added in 1907, and visitors began traveling to the cave in even greater numbers – first by carriage and railroad, and later by car.

The cost has increased over the years. In 2025 the admission price was US$28 for adults, US$18 for age 4 to 12.

== Geology ==
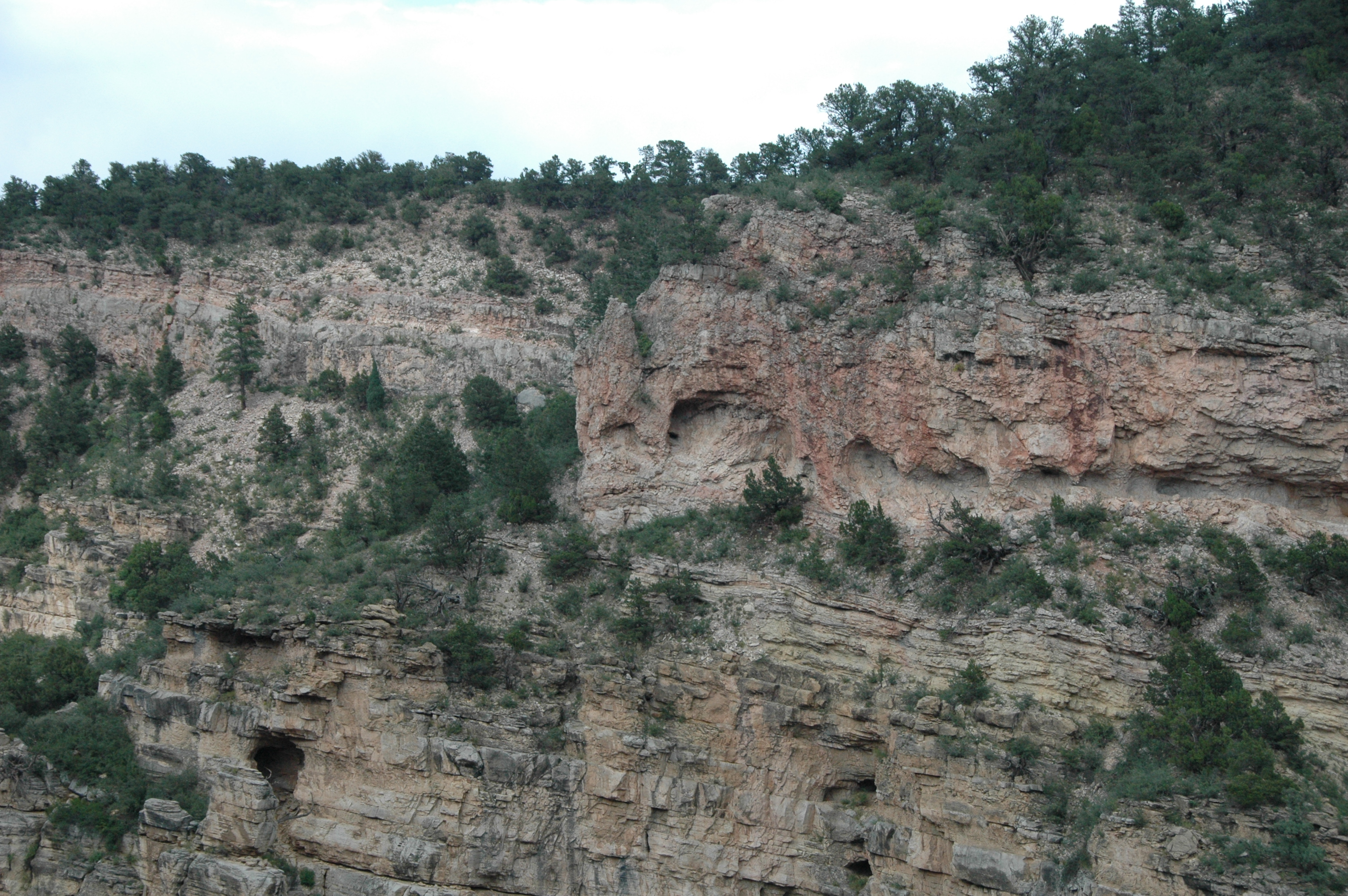
Manitou Limestone.-Williams Canyon Formation-Leadville Limestone

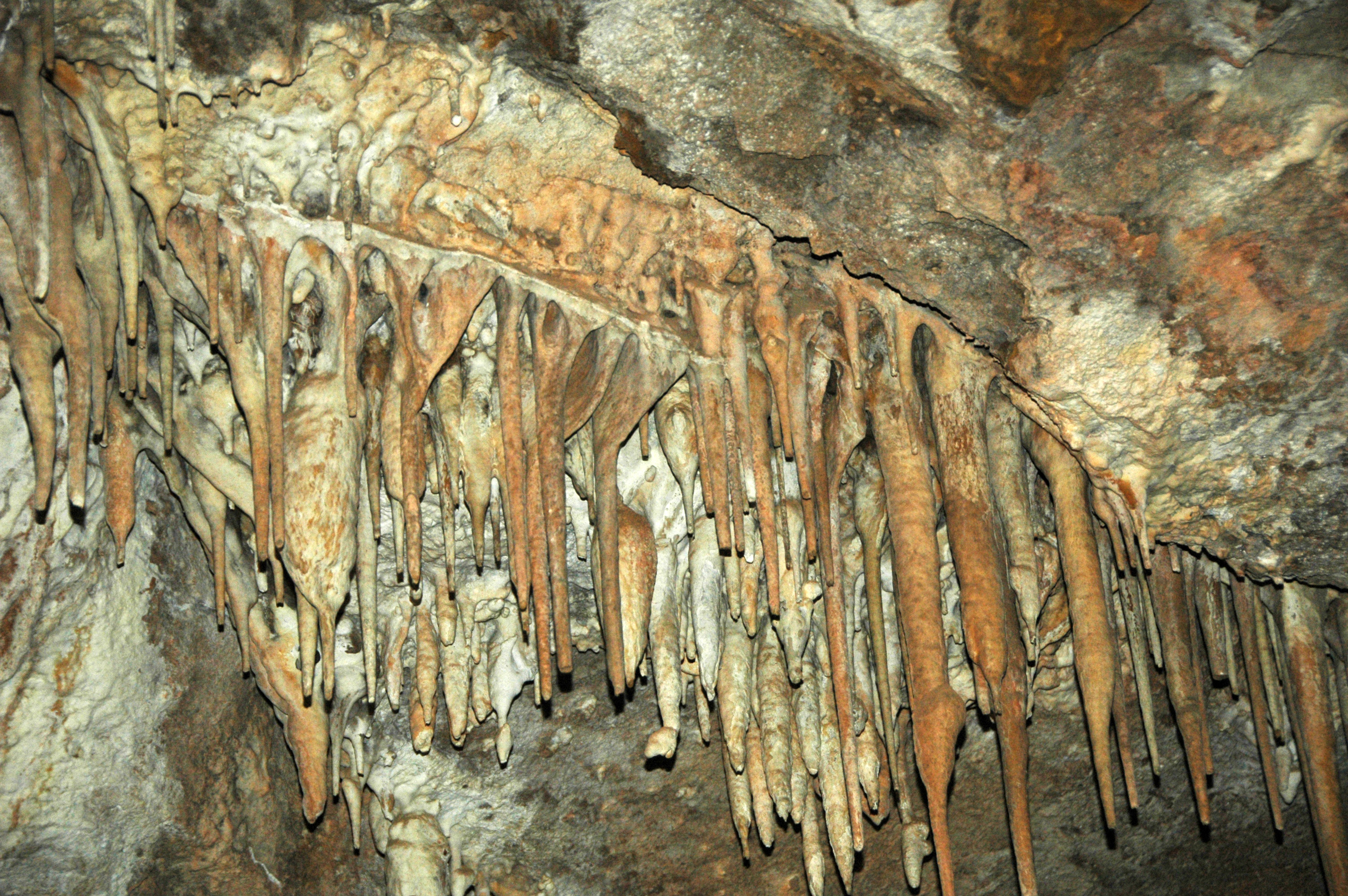
Stalactites & draperies

About 500 million years ago during the Ordovician period warm shallow seas covered the Pikes Peak region of Colorado. The seas were home to abundant shell creatures that accumulated on the sea floor when they died. The layers built up for millions of years and were eventually compacted and hardened into the rock known as limestone. The geological name for the limestone layer found in the cave is Manitou Limestone.

About 70 million years ago the shallow seas receded and the area was lifted forming the Rocky Mountain region. About 4 to 7 million years ago the limestone fell below the water table. Rainwater mixed with carbon dioxide, forming a weak carbonic acid that slowly ate away at the limestone, forming pockets. The pockets slowly enlarged forming passageways and caverns.

In the short steep drive up Williams Canyon to the cave entrance one can view several different depositions of limestone. During the Devonian period the Williams Canyon Limestone was laid down and during the Mississippian period the Leadville Limestone layer was deposited.

=== Cave formations ===
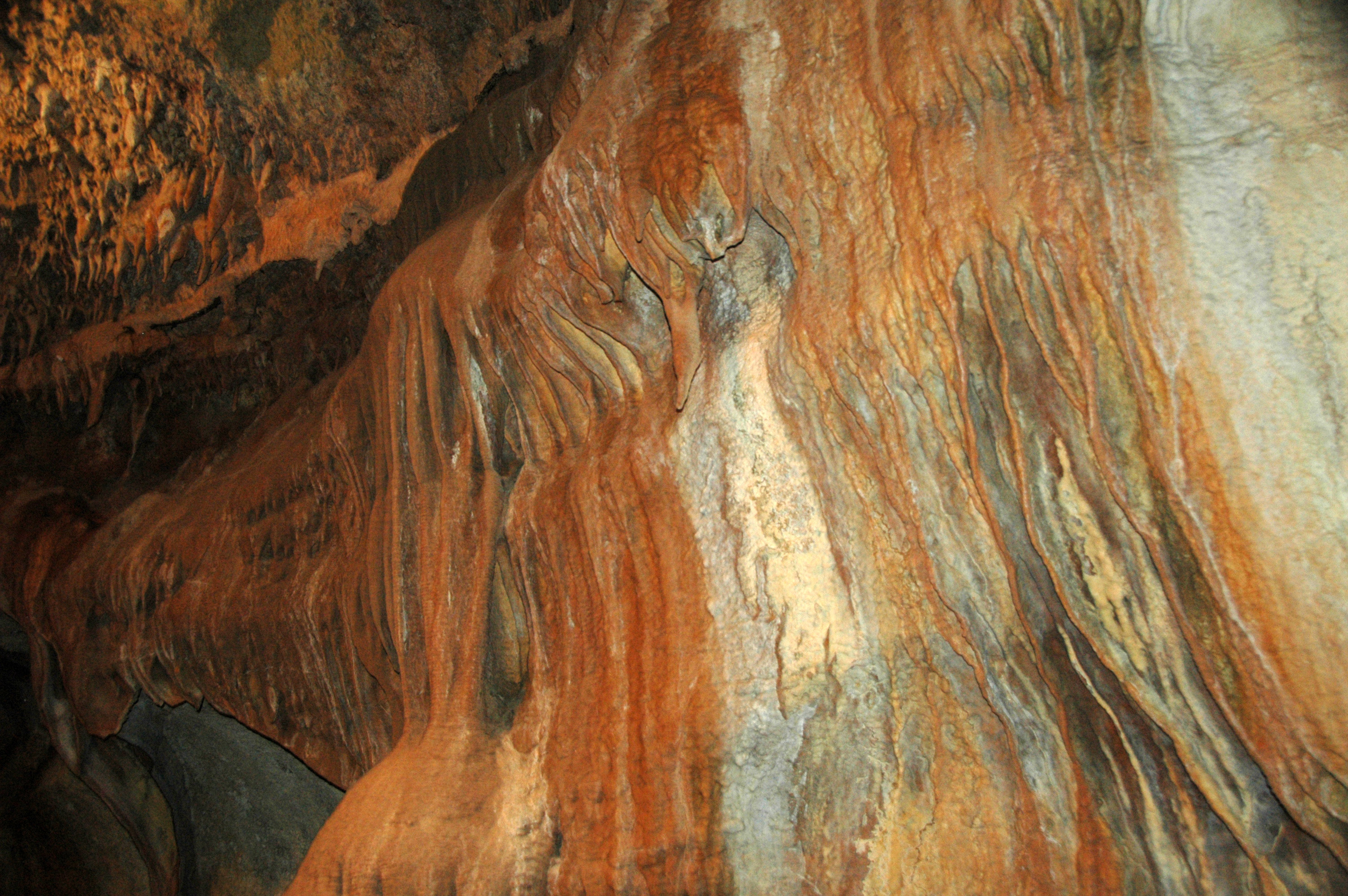
Flowstone & draperies

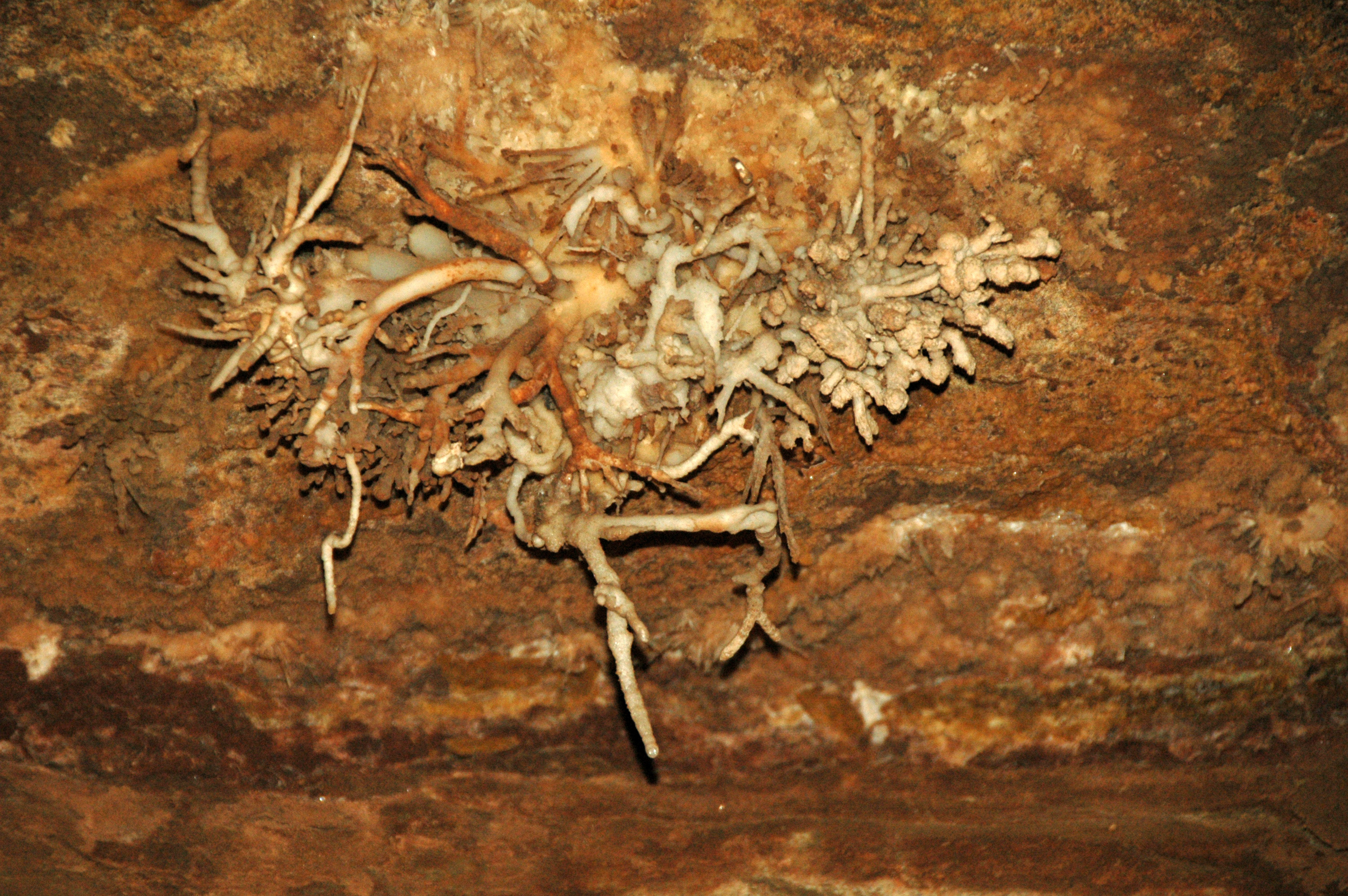
Helictites (Cave of the Winds, Manitou Springs, Colorado, USA)

As the water table dropped within the cave system air began to fill the passageways and caverns. Stalactites formed on the cave's ceilings as calcium carbonate-rich water dripped leaving thin calcite rings that grew into icicle-like shapes over thousands of years. Through the same process stalagmites grew from the cave floors. A third type of structure is called flowstone. Flowstone formations are curtain-like formations that flow along the sides of caverns or passages. They are the most common formation found in "solution caves" in limestone, such as Cave of the Winds. Sometimes called draperies or curtains, they are formed over thousands of years as the mineral-rich water flows over surfaces leaving calcite behind.

The rarest and most delicate formations are called helictites. Helictite forms have been described in several shapes: "hands", ribbon helictites, saws, rods, butterflies, curly-fries, and "clumps of worms". They can be easily broken by the slightest touch and consequently are set away from tour groups. As helictites grow, they change their axis from the vertical at one or more stages of growth, hence the "clumps of worms" description for one type. Several theories as to how and why they defy gravity have been suggested but no theory has yet been proven to be correct.

== In popular culture ==
- The cave is a setting for a 2006 episode of the animated television series South Park, entitled "ManBearPig".
