= Hell on Earth 2006 =

- South Park episode
- Episode no.: Season 10; Episode 11
- Directed by: Trey Parker
- Written by: Trey Parker
- Production code: 1011
- Original air date: October 25, 2006

Episode chronology
← Previous "Miss Teacher Bangs a Boy"	Next → "Go God Go"
- South Park season 10

"Hell on Earth 2006" is the eleventh episode in the tenth season of the American animated television series South Park. The 150th episode of the series overall, it originally aired on Comedy Central in the United States on October 25, 2006. The episode was written and directed by series co-creator Trey Parker.

The episode revolves around Satan having a huge party on Earth on Halloween, obsessing over every detail of the party in the process and catching the ire of the Roman Catholic Church. Meanwhile, Butters summons Biggie Smalls.

This episode parodies Candyman, the television series My Super Sweet 16 and the comedy group The Three Stooges. The episode also received generally positive responses from critics; however, it sparked controversy shortly after its initial airing due to the Steve Irwin joke it contained.

== Plot ==
Satan announces his plans to throw a huge Halloween costume party on Earth at the W hotel, supposedly the Cecil hotel. Among other things, Satan decides upon a cake the size and shape of a Ferrari Enzo, which three notorious serial killers—Ted Bundy, Jeffrey Dahmer, and John Wayne Gacy—are entrusted with bringing to the party. Cardinal Roger Mahony and other Roman Catholic Church officials of Los Angeles, angered that Satan does not invite them to the party, plan to call the fire marshal the night of the party to complain, thus ruining it. When they are unable to do so after discovering that the fire marshal was also invited to the party, the clergy decide to crash it. However, Satan's security make sure they do not get in at all.

Meanwhile, Cartman, Stan, Kyle, Token, Tweek, and Butters experiment with a Bloody Mary-type ritual to summon Biggie Smalls in the same vein as the Candyman. Butters succeeds in summoning him, but Biggie is angered that he will now experience difficulties in getting to the party and demands that Butters help him get there. However, Biggie keeps being summoned back to South Park mid-journey, first by Kyle as part of a dare and then by Randy Marsh after the boys inform him of the summoning ritual, further angering him.

The three serial killers ineptly destroy the cake (à la The Three Stooges) and ultimately kill each other while attempting to make a new one. Satan's assistant, Demonius, finds a cake the exact size and shape of an Acura TSX as a last-minute substitute. Satan is infuriated that he did not receive the right cake. When Demonius points out that his guests are having fun regardless, Satan flies into a rage. The guests get upset and start to leave, and Satan realizes that, in trying to have a party like the girls on My Super Sweet 16, he became like one of them, until he is reassured that even he, Satan, is not that bad. He tells the crowd that he is sorry and invites everyone into the party, including the Catholic priests (along with their naked altar boys on leashes). Having arrived in Los Angeles, Butters uses a guest's make-up mirror to summon Biggie Smalls to the party, who asks Butters to come in with him as thanks, which Butters, knowing his parents will likely ground him for being there without their knowledge or permission, goes along with.

== Production ==
Trey Parker and Matt Stone described the episode as being a "last minute" one; even though they had several ideas for episodes, they wanted to quickly come up with an idea for an episode that featured Halloween because the episode would be airing close to Halloween. The idea of having Satan throw a big party on Earth was what the episode was produced around, and it wasn't until later in the production that the idea to parody the television series My Super Sweet 16 was implemented. Parker and Stone chose to parody that series because they felt that it was the "most disgusting, foul show ever made", describing the people featured on it as "evil" and "horrible". Originally, the episode opened with the scene where the boys are in the bathroom, rather than the scene in Hell. Parker decided to have the scenes switched at the last minute, and felt that it was a bad idea in hindsight.

The episode features the song "Oh Yeah" by Yello when the three killers pick up Satan's Ferrari cake, similar to the song's usage in the 1986 film Ferris Bueller's Day Off. Also during the party, samples from the end theme of the game Half-Life are played.

The scene where Bundy, Dahmer, and Gacy kill each other while attempting to bake a new Ferrari cake was noticeably less violent in the original airing; future airings saw the original uncut scene where Dahmer stabs Bundy in the throat and Gacy smashes Dahmer's skull with a rolling pin.

== Reception ==
The episode received generally positive reviews. IGN's Dan Iverson originally criticized the episode for the lack of storyline development, but later stated that "the storylines were humorous enough that we were able to put aside that there was no real social commentary (like the last three episodes), but instead madcap comedy that was funny based on silly humor alone". Iverson also praised the episode for illustrating Satan as a spoiled child and for the Three Stooges scenes involving the killers, and concluded that "although [the episode] isn't as good as a couple of South Park's other Halloween episodes, it is still a very funny episode". Adam Finley of TV Squad stated that although he thought "Hell on Earth 2006" was a "great episode", it was "most guaranteed to offend somebody". Judge Keefer of DVD Verdict described the episode as "a really great installment with a wincing (yet guilty pleasure) joke", and graded the episode with an A. Chris Longo of Den of Geek listed "Hell on Earth 2006" as the series' best Halloween episode.

=== Steve Irwin controversy ===
Steve Irwin as depicted in the episode

One of the guests appearing at Satan's party is Steve Irwin, who has a stingray protruding from his chest. Satan, upon being informed that said guest is offending some of the others, goes to confront him, but does not realize that it is Irwin at first, thinking instead that it is someone else in a costume, and tells him that it is in bad taste to wear such a costume so soon after Irwin's death. Finding out it actually is Irwin, Satan kicks him out of the party for not wearing a costume. The scene sparked controversy among the media for parodying Irwin's death so soon after its occurrence. The controversy was mainly because of the airing of the episode so close to Irwin's death, since an earlier parody of Irwin in a 1999 South Park episode entitled "Prehistoric Ice Man", did not spark controversy. A friend of Terri Irwin, Steve Irwin's widow, issued a statement about the episode:

Terri is devastated Steve is being mocked in such a cruel way. Her worry is that Bindi and Bob will see it and break down. Steve had as big a sense of humour as anyone, but this goes too far too soon.

—A friend of Terri Irwin

Besides Irwin's family, the episode also received criticism from press personalities; John Beyer, the director of Mediawatch-UK, said that it was in bad taste to create such a scene and the makers of South Park should review their decision to show it. Irwin's fellow naturalist Mark Amey called the show "distasteful shit".

In a response to the controversy around the episode, Tony Fox, a spokesperson for Comedy Central, defended the episode, saying, "The South Park guys do inappropriate things all the time...their goal is to make people laugh, not to offend people." Additionally, another spokesperson for the network has said that "South Park has offended people in the past and probably will again. Regular watchers would not be shocked." Although rumors were spread about the episode not being broadcast in Australia due to the controversy, The Australian Communications and Media Authority (ACMA) announced the episode would be broadcast on SBS, but would be delayed 12 months due to programming issues.

Series co-creators Trey Parker and Matt Stone said that they were surprised to see the Steve Irwin depiction cause so much controversy, essentially since they felt South Park has featured far more offensive material and that, "in South Park lore, it's established that basically everyone ends up in hell" (despite this being retconned in the episode "Best Friends Forever").
