= The Return of Chef =

- South Park episode
- Chef, after being resurrected as "Darth Chef"
- Episode no.: Season 10; Episode 1
- Directed by: Trey Parker
- Written by: Trey Parker
- Production code: 1001
- Original air date: March 22, 2006

Guest appearance
- Peter Serafinowicz as Darth Chef

Episode chronology
← Previous "Bloody Mary"	Next → "Smug Alert!"
- South Park season 10

"The Return of Chef" is the first episode in the tenth season of the American animated television series South Park. The 140th episode of the series overall, it first aired on Comedy Central in the United States on March 22, 2006. The episode was the first after the departure of actor Isaac Hayes, who voiced the character Chef. Hayes, a Scientologist, left after a falling-out with the creators over their treatment of Scientology in the previous season's episode "Trapped in the Closet". Scientology has been accused of using brainwashing techniques, and "The Return of Chef" portrays Chef as having been brainwashed.

In a press statement, Hayes was quoted as saying: "There is a place in this world for satire, but there is a time when satire ends and intolerance and bigotry towards religious beliefs of others begins." While the statement did not directly mention Scientology, South Park's co-creator Matt Stone responded that Hayes' complaints stemmed from the show's criticism of Scientology and that he "has no problem – and he's cashed plenty of checks – with our show making fun of Christians, Muslims, Mormons, or Jews." Stone adds, "[We] never heard a peep out of Isaac in any way until we did Scientology. He wants a different standard for religions other than his own, and to me, that is where intolerance and bigotry begins." Chef's dialogue in the episode is edited from previous recordings of Hayes.

== Plot ==
After leaving South Park to join the "Super Adventure Club", Chef returns and the boys quickly notice that he is acting strangely as he expresses a desire to have sex with them, saying things like, "Kenny, how would you like to sodomize my black ass?" They go to the Super Adventure Club headquarters and discover that the group is made up of explorers who travel worldwide, molesting children. When the explorers' leader, William P. Connelly, unsuccessfully tries to hypnotize the boys, they realize that the club has brainwashed Chef. In an attempt to restore Chef to his former self, the boys take him to a strip club. Chef returns to his old self, but the Super Adventure Club members appear, and kidnap him. The boys follow them back to their headquarters and rescue Chef.

As they are leaving, Connelly reminds Chef why he joined the Super Adventure Club in the first place, telling him that his life will be grand and eternal if he stays with them. Though the boys plead him not to, Chef walks back towards the club. However, the bridge that Chef is crossing suddenly gets struck by lightning and collapses, causing him to fall to his apparent death, therefore soiling his pants after dying. As a funeral for Chef is held back in South Park, the Super Adventure Club members resurrect Chef as Darth Chef, now fully embracing the club's ethics.

== Production ==
Series co-creators Trey Parker and Matt Stone described season ten's production as turbulent, particularly more so than other seasons, because it seemed that each episode they produced caused controversy and thus resulted in distractions. They specifically cited the circumstances surrounding Isaac Hayes' departure from the show as being a catalyst for the extra attention the show began receiving. They decided to create "The Return of Chef" as a way of retaliating to the press release statement that Hayes had made regarding his departure. They thought that Hayes and the show had parted ways on good terms, and were somewhat angered by the release, calling it "ridiculous". Before that press release, however, Parker and Stone had been working on what would turn out to be "Cartoon Wars Part I" and "Cartoon Wars Part II", with the intent to open the season with those episodes. They ran into difficulties with the network and postponed those episodes until later in the season. Parker and Stone felt that if the statement by Hayes was never released, they would not have produced more episodes involving Scientology.

== Reception ==
The original television airing of the episode drew more than 3.5 million viewers, including 2.3 million aged between 17 and 49. This popularity made the episode Comedy Central's highest-rated season premiere since "Jared Has Aides" in 2002 according to a Comedy Central spokesman and Nielsen Media Research. The episode was also ranked fourth in video sales on iTunes.

"The Return of Chef" received a generally positive critical reception. Eric Goldman of IGN reviewed the episode and gave it an overall rating of 8.0, noting the creation of new dialogue for Chef by splicing previous recordings of his character. Goldman also noted that the eulogy for Chef "probably says how Parker and Stone really feel about Hayes". Adam Finley reviewed the episode for TV Squad, and described the episode as "one of the funniest, and most memorable, of the series".

== Home media ==
"The Return of Chef", along with the thirteen other episodes from South Park's tenth season, was released on a three-disc DVD set in the United States on August 21, 2007. The set includes brief audio commentaries by series co-creators Trey Parker and Matt Stone for each episode.
