= ManBearPig =

- South Park episode
- Episode no.: Season 10; Episode 6
- Directed by: Trey Parker
- Written by: Trey Parker
- Production code: 1006
- Original air date: April 26, 2006

Episode chronology
← Previous "A Million Little Fibers"	Next → "Tsst"
- South Park season 10

"ManBearPig" is the sixth episode in the tenth season of the American animated television series South Park. The 145th episode of the series overall, it first aired on Comedy Central in the United States on April 26, 2006. In the episode, Al Gore visits South Park to warn everyone about a creature called ManBearPig, an allegory for global warming. Gore then gets Stan, Kyle, Cartman, and Kenny trapped inside the Cave of the Winds.

== Plot ==
Al Gore (voiced by Trey Parker) visits South Park Elementary and warns the school's students about an imaginary monster named ManBearPig which roams the Earth attacking humans. Gore describes the monster as "half man, half bear, half pig." While Gore continues to spread awareness of the fictional cryptid, Randy advises Stan and the boys to not be involved with Gore as he is only seeking attention. One night, Gore calls Stan about ManBearPig and Stan tries to turn him down gently; Gore weeps from this rejection until Stan changes his mind. Gore then persuades Stan, Kyle, Cartman, and Kenny to attend an emergency ManBearPig meeting, where Gore states that the creature is hiding in the tourist attraction, Cave of the Winds.The boys are unwilling to go at first but are persuaded when Gore says that he could get them excused from school.

In the caves, the echo sound the cave is named for causes Gore to mistake the sound for the creature. He fires a shotgun wildly, which causes a cave-in that leaves the boys trapped in the caverns; all others escape before the cave-in and Gore believes ManBearPig is at fault. While the boys search for a way out of the cave, Cartman discovers a small cavern filled with what appears to be treasure. Greedily, he starts swallowing the treasure piece-by-piece to smuggle it out of the cave.

As a rescue team assembles outside the cave to find the boys, Gore diverts the flow of a nearby stream in order to cause a flood which fills the cavern in an attempt to kill the still-unseen monster. The boys manage to escape just as a memorial service is being held for them. When Gore tries to take credit for saving them, Stan, having lost all sympathy for him, angrily yells at Gore and calls him a "loser" for using the situation 'as an excuse to draw attention to [himself]', but he is unfazed as he is certain that he killed ManBearPig. Cartman tries to walk away, but he does not get far before he begins painfully defecating pieces of treasure. It is revealed to Cartman that the treasure was a prop used for tourist photo ops and "is only worth about $14". This upsets Cartman as he continually defecates the fake treasure and Kyle angrily admonishes him for all the trouble, of trying to save him. Gore announces his plans to make a film starring himself and dons a cape saying "Excelsior!" before pretending to fly away.

== Reception ==
Eric Goldman from IGN gave the episode a score of 6.0 out of 10. He thought it was a superior episode compared with "A Million Little Fibers", the previous episode of the season, but still called it an "okay, middle of the road" episode.

== Home media ==
"ManBearPig", along with the thirteen other episodes from South Park's tenth season, was released on a three-disc DVD set in the United States on August 21, 2007. The set includes brief audio commentaries by series co-creators Trey Parker and Matt Stone for each episode.

== Legacy ==
ManBearPig is one of the antagonist characters shown in the "Imaginationland" trilogy in the eleventh season of South Park.

The episode is notorious as an allegory for climate change denial because the South Park creators Trey Parker and Matt Stone were initially unconvinced about Gore's film An Inconvenient Truth. Gore and ManBearPig returned in the sixth and seventh episodes of the 22nd season of South Park, "Time to Get Cereal" and "Nobody Got Cereal?", in which the boys realize that ManBearPig exists and apologize to Gore. ManBearPig returned in the 2022 films South Park: The Streaming Wars and South Park: The Streaming Wars Part 2, which reveals that ManBearPig has a family.

Gore appears as a boss in the South Park game ”South Park: The Stick of Truth”

The 2018 action-adventure game Red Dead Redemption 2, developed and published by Rockstar Games, features a creature that looks like a cross between a human, a bear, and a pig chained to a wall.

"ManBearPig" is used as a nickname for Pantolambda bathmodon by some researchers, because it had "five-fingered hands, a bearlike face and the stocky build of a pig".

== See also ==
- Al Gore's Penguin Army, a webvideo satirizing Gore
