= Cartoon Wars Part II =

- South Park episode
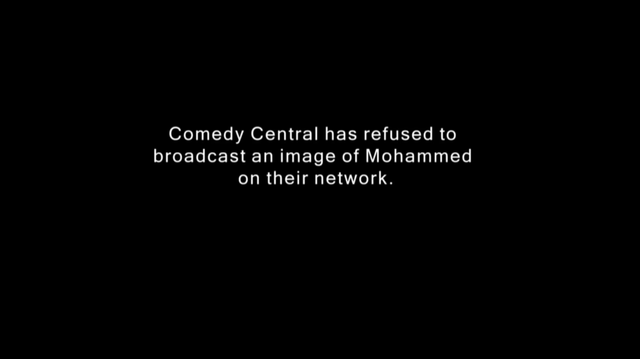
- Title card shown in lieu of the episode's climax
- Episode no.: Season 10; Episode 4
- Directed by: Trey Parker
- Written by: Trey Parker
- Production code: 1004
- Original air date: April 12, 2006

Episode chronology
← Previous "Cartoon Wars Part I"	Next → "A Million Little Fibers"
- South Park season 10

"Cartoon Wars Part II" is the fourth episode in the tenth season of the American animated television series South Park. The 143rd episode of the series overall, it first aired on Comedy Central in the United States on April 12, 2006. Following "Cartoon Wars Part I", it is the second part of a two-episode story-arc, which focuses on Cartman's efforts to get the television series Family Guy cancelled by exploiting fears of retaliation by Muslims to an upcoming Family Guy episode in which the Islamic prophet Muhammad will appear, in violation of some interpretations of Muslim law. Kyle instead urges the president of Fox, the network airing Family Guy, to air the episode in an exercise of free speech.

The episodes were inspired by the Jyllands-Posten Muhammad cartoons controversy, which began in response to a Danish newspaper's printing of cartoons depicting Muhammed in September 2005, leading to worldwide protests and occasionally violent demonstrations and riots in early 2006. It also came from South Park creators Trey Parker and Matt Stone's general dislike of Family Guy, which they viewed as overly reliant on cutaway gags for humor and less so on story. During production, the duo ran into reluctance from Comedy Central and parent company Viacom, who felt their insistence to depict Muhammad disregarded concerns for public safety. Parker and Stone argued that the network was giving in to hypothetical violence, labeling them hypocrites due to their satirizing of other religions in the past. The network interference was written into the episode's storyline.

Comedy Central eventually aired the episode with a black title card during the Muhammad sequence, censoring the depiction. The episode received positive reviews from critics; while the episode's censorship did attract headlines, it received more attention for its lampooning of Family Guy. When the series was transferred to HBO Max in 2020, it was announced that "Cartoon Wars Part I" and "Cartoon Wars Part II" would be two of five episodes cut from the series, alongside "Super Best Friends", "200," and "201," all of which are episodes featuring Muhammad. The episode is also absent from Paramount+ for the same reason.

== Plot ==
Eric Cartman has an intense disdain for the television program Family Guy due to frequent comparisons between his sense of humor and that of the show by his peers. When Cartman learns that an episode of the show is to feature a depiction of the Islamic prophet Muhammad, he exploits fears of retaliation to urge Fox, the network on which Family Guy airs, to pull the episode. Cartman pretends to be the sickly Danish son of a cartoonist with a broken leg, telling the Fox executives that his father was killed by terrorists during the Jyllands-Posten Muhammad cartoons controversy and pleading that they pull the Family Guy episode. His story touches the executives, who encourage Cartman to try to persuade the writers to yield.

The episode begins with a segment from the in-universe TV show Terrance and Phillip. Titled Terrance and Phillip in Mystery at the Lazy "J" Ranch, the segment concerns the Canadian duo at a cattle ranch meeting the Muslim prophet Muhammad, with Terrance remarking that the duo have "read all aboot [him] in the Quran" [sic] before enlisting his help to solve a murder, though the episode is censored by the Canadian Broadcasting Company, as Muhammad is continuously obscured by a censor bar. This censorship outrages the duo, leading them to confront the network president: who claims he has censored the prophet out of fear that Muslim extremists will attack Canada, citing the current predicament with Family Guy as justification. Terrance and Phillip object to the censorship, though are rebuffed by the network president: who claims that Terrance and Phillip's show has become "too preachy".

Meanwhile, Kyle, who enjoys Family Guy, arrives at the Fox Studio to foil Cartman's plans assisted by an avid Family Guy fan, though is knocked unconscious by an ally of Cartman's implied to be Bart Simpson who, also wanting to destroy Family Guy, restrains Kyle in a supply shed.

Cartman is introduced to the Family Guy writing staff: a group of manatees who live in a large tank, and construct the plot for each episode of the show by picking up "idea balls" from a large pile, each of which has a different noun, a verb or a pop culture reference written on it, and delivering them to a machine that then forms a cutaway gag. The manatees refuse to work if any idea ball is removed from their tank, making censorship unfeasible. Cartman therefore deduces that it may be possible to prevent the Family Guy staff from working by removing an idea ball from the tank.

Cartman reunites with a restrained Kyle, praising his enraged reaction to the scheme: proclaiming it as "emotional character development based on what's happening in the storyline! Not at all like Family Guy" and reveals his plan. The Fox president is therefore convinced that the manatees are spoiled and abusive of the executives' generosity, and he thus decides to pull the new Family Guy episode shortly before airtime. Cartman feels victorious, but Kyle shows up: claiming he convinced Cartman's coconspirator to set him free.

After a physical altercation between Cartman and Kyle, the two venture go to the Fox president's office. Kyle tells the president that Cartman has duped him into pulling the episode, though Cartman gains the upper hand by brandishing a gun. Kyle implores the president not to censor the episode, despite Cartman's threats of violence. The network president ultimately decides, in spite of the threats of violence from both Cartman and the terrorists, that Family Guy should be aired uncensored.

The Family Guy episode airs, and features a scene in which Peter Griffin compares receiving a pink slip at work to yet another encounter he had with Muhammad: in which the prophet handed him a "salmon helmet" whilst Peter wore a toga, though the scene with Muhammad was cut by Comedy Central, and is replaced by a black screen and a title card reading, "In this shot, Mohammed hands a football helmet to Family Guy. Comedy Central has refused to broadcast an image of Mohammed on their network." [sic]

Terrorist leader Ayman al-Zawahiri, reminding America that it was warned not to show Muhammad, initiates Al-Qaeda's retaliation — a crudely animated video depicting President George W. Bush, Carson Kressley, Tom Cruise, Katie Holmes, and Jesus Christ defecating on each other and the American flag. After the video ends, al-Zawahiri gloats of their "retaliation" by saying they "burned" the Americans and that it "was way funnier than Family Guy."

== Production ==
That's what we said to them, was, 'This is South Park, and we rip on absolutely everyone in really horrible, terrible ways. And if you're saying that this is the one thing we can't do, besides Tom Cruise, because they're threatening violence, well, then, I guess that's what everyone should do. Then if the Catholics don't want us ripping on Jesus anymore, they should just threaten you with violence, and they'll get their way.' That's why it is such a slippery slope and such a dangerous path to go down.

— Trey Parker, 2006

The episode was largely inspired by the Jyllands-Posten Muhammad cartoons controversy, in which twelve editorial cartoons, most of which depicted the Islamic prophet Muhammad, were published in the Danish newspaper Jyllands-Posten, leading to protests around the world in early 2006, including violent demonstrations and riots in some Muslim countries. The duo had wanted to create an episode centering on Muhammad months before that particular controversy flared. The episode's title was inspired by a headline on a television news broadcast of the controversy: "Breaking news: Cartoon wars. Muslims angered over cartoon." After these incidents, Parker and Stone wanted to include Muhammad "just […] standing there", as a harmless and not overtly offensive depiction. They assumed that Comedy Central would support their efforts, in light of their established practice of tackling serious subjects with satire.

According to Parker, the network was troubled by the duo's stated intention to produce an episode on Muhammad, but nonetheless did not oppose it, in light of how lucrative the show was. According to Stone, Comedy Central eventually withdrew its support when executives in higher positions at parent company Viacom denied the request. As a result, "Cartoon Wars Part II" is largely based around real-life censorship they faced in producing the episode. The duo argued that refusing to show images of Muhammad would be giving in to violence. They were partially fascinated by this emergence of a new taboo informed by threats. In the episode, Kyle's impassioned plea to the president of Fox is culled from Parker and Stone's conversations with Comedy Central executives, and he even refers to the Fox president as "Doug", in reference to Comedy Central executive Doug Herzog. The network's reluctance to allow the images to be shown factored into the duo's decision to make the episode a two-parter; "Well, they’re still not letting us show Muhammed […] we'll argue about it for another week", said Parker. While the duo agreed that the network had the right to air whatever they want, they viewed their censorship as "wimpy".

Part of Parker and Stone's anger came from the fact that "Super Best Friends", a 2001 episode of South Park, featured images of Muhammad uncensored as a superhero, and aired without censorship for several years on both Comedy Central and in local syndication. The duo struggled to come up with how to present Comedy Central's refusal to broadcast the images as a real situation and not a joke. Parker later related previous South Park episodes, "Cartman Joins NAMBLA" (2000) and "Trapped in the Closet" (2005), which parodied NAMBLA and Scientology, respectively, as similar situations. "You have to make sure, when you're doing that kind of subject matter, you want people to know what you're doing is a joke and then what really is real, you know, you're trying to make fun of", said Parker. The duo, instead of settling on the black title card, toyed with "putting some really incredible quote up or making a big speech. At the end of the day it felt a little too high and mighty, so we ended up doing the driest thing possible."

== Cultural references ==
"Cartoon Wars Part II" contains several cultural references. The episode parodies the Fox animated sitcom Family Guy, which was revived from cancellation the previous year and attracted immense popularity. Parker stated in the director's commentary for the episode that, "we totally understand that people love it, that's why we put it in the show, we understand that it speaks to some people and it can just be a simple laugh and that's great and we certainly don't think it should be taken off the air or anything like that, we just don't respect it in terms of writing", later referring to the writers behind the show as "smart" but emphatically criticizing their overuse of "gag-humor". Stone added that the Family Guy writing staff "[needs] to work harder".

In referencing Family Guy, the episode also brings another Fox television sitcom into the equation: The Simpsons. Following the airing of the episode's first part, the duo received flowers from the producers of The Simpsons and phone calls from those involved with King of the Hill at Fox (who remarked, in reference to their mocking of Family Guy, "you're doing God's work"). Parker claimed that the majority of Hollywood at the time disliked the success of Family Guy, both for what was viewed as subpar, lazy writing and for petty, jealous reasons, regarding its high ratings. As Parker and Stone immensely respected The Simpsons, they incorporated the reactions into the episode, with Cartman meeting Bart Simpson, with whom he shares a dislike of Family Guy. The duo also inserted a reference to the staff at King of the Hill. "There was this animation solidarity moment, where everyone did come together over their hatred of Family Guy", Parker joked.

The episode's opening is self-referential; it is an homage to the controversy that erupted when the duo opened the second season of South Park in 1998 not with the conclusion to the "Cartman's Mom is a Dirty Slut" cliffhanger, but with an entirely different, unrelated episode revolving around the show-within-a-show characters Terrance and Phillip ("Terrance and Phillip in Not Without My Anus").

== Reception ==
=== Critical response ===
Despite the controversy surrounding the image of Muhammad, the episode received high acclaim. Eric Goldman of IGN gave the episode a perfect review, with a score of 10 out of 10, saying, "The really ironic thing here is that South Park already did show Mohammed prominently, in the "Super Best Friends" episode in 2001. Clearly Matt and Trey are also commenting on how times have changed, and how the acts of select extremists can create such specific fears in the powers that be; hammering home their point was the episode's conclusion, which featured terrorists responding to Family Guy with a cartoon of their own, showing Jesus defecating on George W. Bush and the American flag, which pointedly was shown without being censored." This episode also won an IGN Editors Choice Award. A 2011 review of the episode from The A.V. Club is part of a series that examines episodes that "exemplify the spirit of its time and the properties that make television a unique medium". Noel Murray writes that the episode "slyly deals with censorship and public pressures of varying degrees—including some that are fairly discreet".

Seth MacFarlane responded positively to the episode. During his "class day" address at Harvard University on June 7, 2006, he addressed Stone and Parker's criticisms in character as Stewie, stating that the "...cutaways and flashbacks have nothing to do with the story. They're just there to be 'funny'. That is a shallow indulgence that South Park is quite above, and, for that, I salute them." In an interview with Rolling Stone in 2012, MacFarlane called the episode "funny and accurate".

=== Controversy ===
In the week prior to the episode's airing, the teaser advertisement referenced the situation: "Will television executives take a stand for free speech? Or will Comedy Central puss out?" Comedy Central's decision to censor the image was due to concerns for public safety. The network issued a short statement the day following the episode's airing: “In light of recent world events, we feel we made the right decision.” "Cartoon Wars" followed only weeks after another religious run-in with the network, in which Comedy Central pulled a rerun of the season nine episode "Trapped in the Closet" due its apparent mocking of Scientology. Stone publicly criticized Comedy Central executive Doug Herzog's decision as "cowardly" in Daily Variety.

Following the episode's airing, the ending attracted publicity, often misrepresenting and simplifying the segment's theme and message and sensationalizing the appearances of Jesus and President George W. Bush. The episode aired during the Holy Week for Christians, prompting outrage from that community over the portrayal of Jesus. William Anthony Donohue of the Catholic League criticized Stone and Parker. "The ultimate hypocrite is not Comedy Central — that's their decision not to show the image of Muhammad or not — it's Parker and Stone", he said. "Like little whores, they'll sit there and grab the bucks. They'll sit there and they'll whine and they'll take their shot at Jesus. That's their stock in trade." In response to these criticisms, Parker and Stone agreed with these groups, noting that while images of Muhammed were forbidden, it instead appeared to be "open season" on Jesus, hence their depiction to illustrate the hypocrisy of the network. The duo subsequently made Donohue a villain in the 2007 episode "Fantastic Easter Special".

In recent years, the episode has become notorious not for its lampooning of censorship and the Muhammad controversy, but for its criticism of Family Guy. "You’d think [Muhammad] would be the flashpoint. But no. It’s Family Guy everyone’s talking about (at least, in this hemisphere)", said Scott Brown of Entertainment Weekly. The duo were disappointed upon their realization that fans cared less about their opinions on censorship and freedom of speech, but rather, were fixated on Tom Cruise and the controversy surrounding "Trapped in the Closet".

Following the episode's broadcast, Harper's Magazine approached the duo to print their uncensored, original image of Muhammad in an issue, but Comedy Central would not approve of the request. "Harper's is in every Barnes & Noble, every Borders in the country now. I saw it in the airport. It has all the Danish cartoons, and nothing happened. The risks were totally overestimated, I thought", said Stone.

At a Television Critics Association (TCA) discussion in July 2006, Herzog responded to criticism directed at him:

I don't feel unlike Matt and Trey to a certain degree. You feel bad, but it's a big judgment call made on behalf of, as Matt said, a big media company. The ramifications are Matt and Trey being pissed at you and Matt calling you a coward in Daily Variety. […] But you know, it's just a tough [situation]. Did we over react? For sure. And I think history will probably show that, we hope. We'd like to think. And in a perfect world we would have liked to have done it -- [It was] a judgment call; one of the very few, although there seem to have been a lot over the last six months. Matt and Trey enjoy, I think, a very fair amount of creative freedom. But it really just comes down to a judgment call. And like I said, I think history might show we overreacted, but we're willing to live like that.

Stone referred to the episode's censorship as "really, beyond creatively disappointing […] because we thought we could do something really important."

== Home media ==
"Cartoon Wars Part II", along with the thirteen other episodes from South Park's tenth season, was released on a three-disc DVD set in the United States on August 21, 2007. The set includes brief audio commentaries by series co-creators Trey Parker and Matt Stone for each episode. "Cartoon Wars Part II" was also released as part of The Cult of Cartman, a 2008 DVD compilation of Cartman-centric episodes.

== See also ==
- Criticism of Family Guy
