= Cannabition =

Cannabis museum in Nevada, US

Cannabition was a cannabis-themed museum in the Neonopolis shopping center in Las Vegas, Nevada. Opened in 2018, it featured what was billed as the largest bong, reported as 22 feet (6.7 m) or 24 feet (7.3 m) in length. In 2018 and 2022, the museum exhibited Hunter S. Thompson's red 1972 Chevy Caprice. The entrance featured a portrait of Jimi Hendrix juxtaposed with a D.A.R.E. logo, and admission price was set at $24.20.

In 2024, plans were announced to open a 13,000 square foot Cannabition "experiential exhibit" at Planet 13 dispensary in Las Vegas, this time featuring a 14-foot bong.
