= You Have 0 Friends =

- South Park episode
- Stan is transported to a virtual world that is the embodiment of the social networking that occurs on Facebook. The world's look borrows from the distinctive visual style of the 1982 film Tron.
- Episode no.: Season 14; Episode 4
- Directed by: Trey Parker
- Written by: Trey Parker
- Production code: 1404
- Original air date: April 7, 2010

Episode chronology
← Previous "Medicinal Fried Chicken"	Next → "200"
- South Park season 14

"You Have 0 Friends" is the fourth episode of the 14th season of the American animated television series South Park, and the 199th episode of the series overall. It first aired on Comedy Central in the United States on April 7, 2010. In the episode, Kyle Broflovski, Eric Cartman and Kenny McCormick make Stan Marsh a profile on the social networking service Facebook against his wishes, and he becomes extremely frustrated with everyone asking him for friend requests. After he gets fed up with Facebook, Stan tries to delete his profile but is sucked into a virtual Facebook world. Meanwhile, Kyle starts trying to find ways to get more friends on Facebook after he drastically starts losing them due to his befriending of a third-grade friendless Facebook user, whom everyone considers a loser.

The episode was written and directed by co-creator Trey Parker and was rated TV-MA L in the United States. "You Have 0 Friends" features references to Facebook, and Stan's plotline parodies the 1982 Walt Disney Pictures film Tron with Stan in the role of Kevin Flynn, and its climax borrows from the climax of the 2009 Japanese animated science fiction film Summer Wars. The episode also parodies the CNBC series Mad Money, the online chat website Chatroulette, and the social network game FarmVille. "You Have 0 Friends" has received positive reviews from critics, and according to Nielsen Media Research, the episode was viewed by 3.071 million viewers and became the cable lead in the 18–49 Wednesday night.

== Plot ==
Kyle Broflovski, Eric Cartman and Kenny McCormick surprise Stan Marsh by creating a Facebook account for him. Stan protests, but is quickly pressured by family and friends to add them as friends. To his annoyance and frustration, Stan finds people such as his father Randy, his grandmother, and even his girlfriend Wendy Testaburger confronting him over his supposed disregard for them and judging his friendship solely by his Facebook configuration. Meanwhile, Kyle adds shy student Kip Drordy (anagram: Dorky Drip) to his thriving friends list out of pity, but his number of Facebook friends rapidly declines after doing so, in part due to a Mad Friends podcast he finds Cartman has set up in which he berates Kyle for choosing Kip as a friend and asserts nobody will want to hang out with him. While Kyle is understanding, on principle and out of pity, he cannot bring himself to delete Kip to please others. Desperate to stem the loss of friends, he asks Cartman for advice. Cartman introduces Kyle to Chatroulette as a way to make new friends, which fails as most of the people on the site are online predators (either masturbating or flashing their genitals), until Cartman finally finds another Jewish kid named Isiah, who agrees to be Kyle's friend, much to Kyle's delight.

Meanwhile, Stan now has 845,323 friends (almost all of whom he hardly knows or does not know) on his account and has finally decided to delete it, only to find that Facebook refuses to allow him to. Instead of deleting his account, Stan is forcibly transported by the software into the virtual world of Facebook, where he meets "profiles" of everyone he knows who communicate in Facebook lingo and is forced to engage in Facebook activities such as Yahtzee. Unexpectedly winning on the first roll with a Yahtzee, deleting his opponent in the process, Stan escapes and finds his way to Kyle's Farm Town farm, blaming Kyle for getting him "sucked into Facebook" in the first place. Stan orders Kyle to check out his profile status, and Kyle finds out that Stan is supposedly hosting a party elsewhere in Facebook at Café World. Kyle makes it to Stan's party, only to find that Isiah has refused to be his friend because of Kip. Desperate to retain some friends, Kyle finally deletes Kip, leaving him with no friends. Kip, too, is disheartened to find his friend has abandoned him.

At the party, Stan encounters his online profile, which has the form of a huge monstrous version of himself. It challenges him to a game of Yahtzee and Stan wins, again on the first roll with a Yahtzee, causing the profile to be finally deleted. The victory returns Stan to the real world once more. He now has no Facebook friends, and Randy, upon realizing that Stan is no longer his friend, asks Stan why he deleted him. Stan explains what just happened to him and that he has "sent all his friends somewhere else." Back at Kip's house, Kip is still depressed about Kyle deleting him as a friend but is then overjoyed when all 845,323 friends Stan had prior to deletion are suddenly transferred to his account as friends.

== Production and cultural references ==
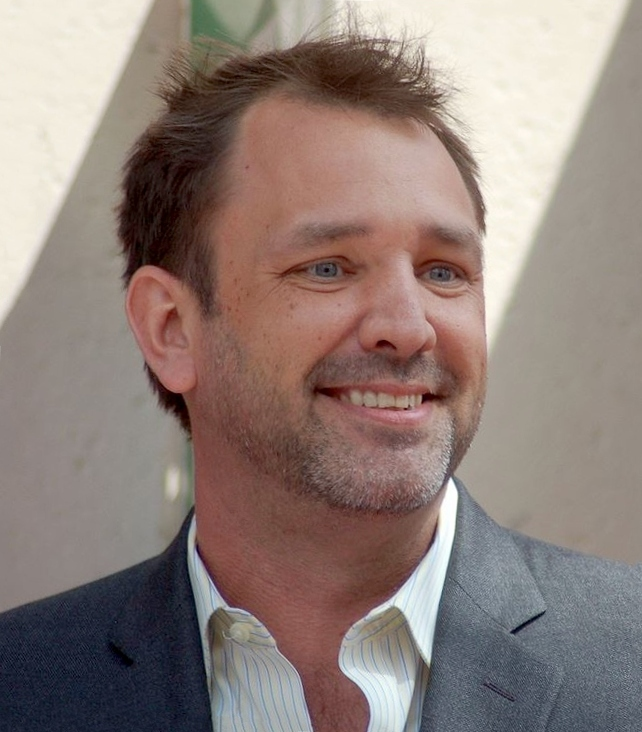
South Park co-creator Trey Parker wrote "You Have 0 Friends"

"You Have 0 Friends" was written and directed by co-series co-creator Trey Parker. He came up with the episode after signing up for Facebook and actually being sucked into it until people were angry that he did not respond to anyone on Facebook. He came up with the idea of doing something similar to Tron. The episode prominently features multiple aspects of Facebook, including its games Farmville, Café World and a digital version of the Milton Bradley game Yahtzee. Also, many aspects of the virtual Facebook world Stan gets sucked into in the episode parody the film Tron. Stan's Facebook account is based on the Master Control Program. Cartman's podcast, Mad Friends, is a parody of a segment from the financial show Mad Money hosted by Jim Cramer on CNBC.

== Reception and release ==
"You Have 0 Friends" originally aired on April 7, 2010, with a TV-MA rating in the United States, on Comedy Central. In its original American broadcast, it was watched by 3.071 million viewers, according to Nielsen Media Research. This made it the second most viewed cable show of the night after In Plain Sight and attracting more viewers than the previous episode, "Medicinal Fried Chicken". The episode also received an 18–49 rating of 1.7 and a share of 5% edging out Tyler Perry's House of Payne for the cable lead in the demographic.

The episode received generally positive reviews from critics. The Indiana Daily Student's Brian Welk called the episode "fairly enjoyable," joking that his Facebook status would say that he "hopes the 200th episode [of South Park] is as good as the Facebook one!" Tucker of Entertainment Weekly said "The half-hour was shrewdly precise in its targets: The older audience that communes on Facebook (such as parents and grandparents) as well as lonely kids; as usual, "South Park" is merciless when it smells a baby-boomer-adopted trend." Ramsey Isler of IGN gave the episode a 9/10, calling it "brilliant from beginning to end, and one of the best episodes the series has served up in a while." Carlos Delgado of iF Magazine wrote that "You have 0 Friends has the right amount of humor, intelligence, and sarcasm to match any South Park episode. The question is, does it become an instant classic?" Cristina Everett of the New York Daily News called the episode "hilarious, yet heartwarming", adding that the Kip Drordy subplot was "endearing".

There have been less favorable reviews of "You Have 0 Friends" that criticize the use of its cultural Facebook jokes. TV Fanatic, who gave the episode 3/5, said there was "too much Facebook" in the episode and that "it was a great parody, but just a decent episode that could have had more LOL moments". Grading it a D+, The A.V. Club's Emily VanDerWerff opined the episode "mostly made all of the jokes about [Facebook] that the rest of us did back when Facebook first invaded all of our lives. It doesn't give me high hopes for the inevitable Twitter episode the show does in 2013."

"You Have 0 Friends", along with the thirteen other episodes from South Park's fourteenth season, were released on a three-disc DVD set and two-disc Blu-ray set in the United States on April 26, 2011.
