= Cannabis dispensaries in the United States =

Local government regulated location

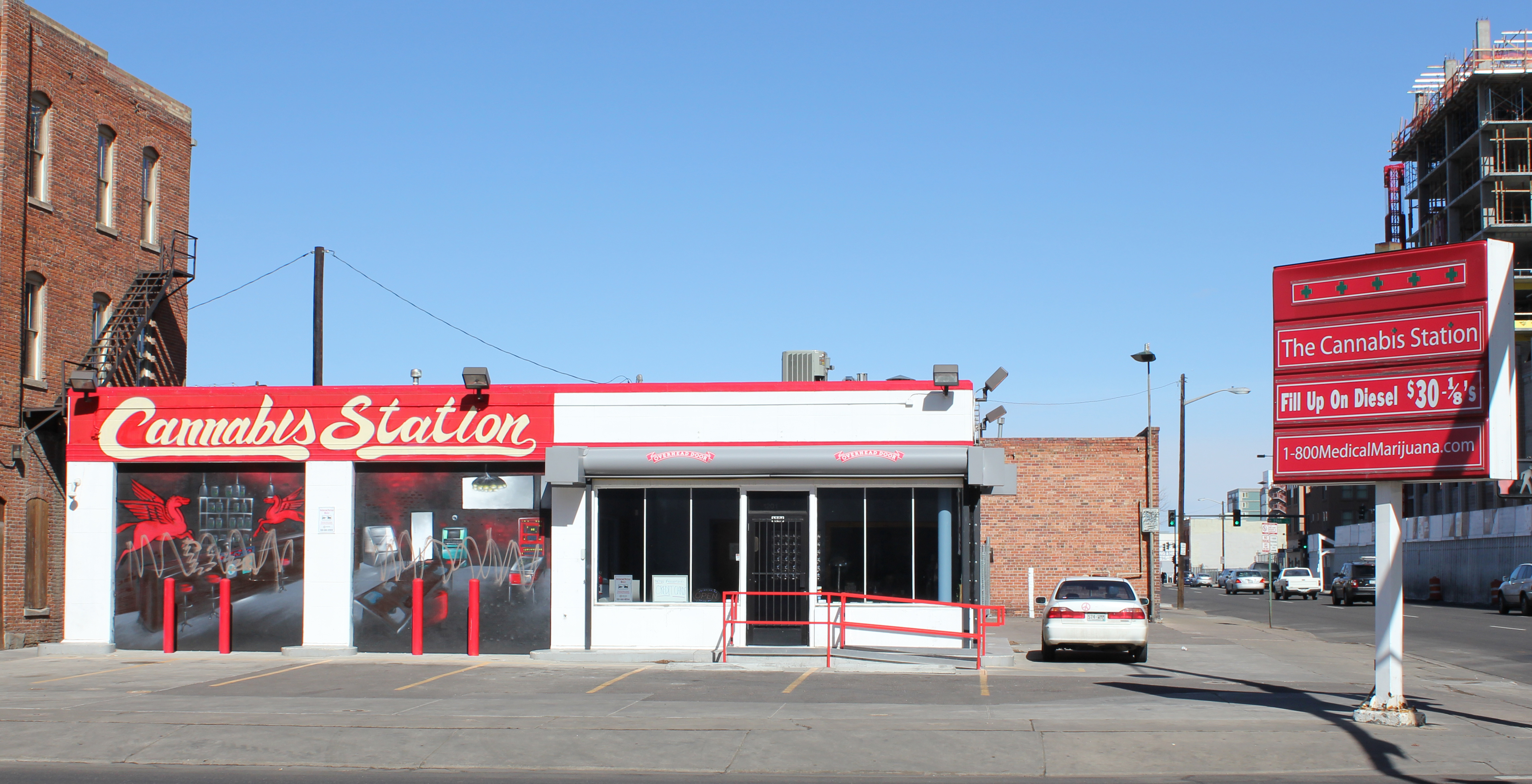
Cannabis Station, a medical cannabis dispensary in Denver, Colorado

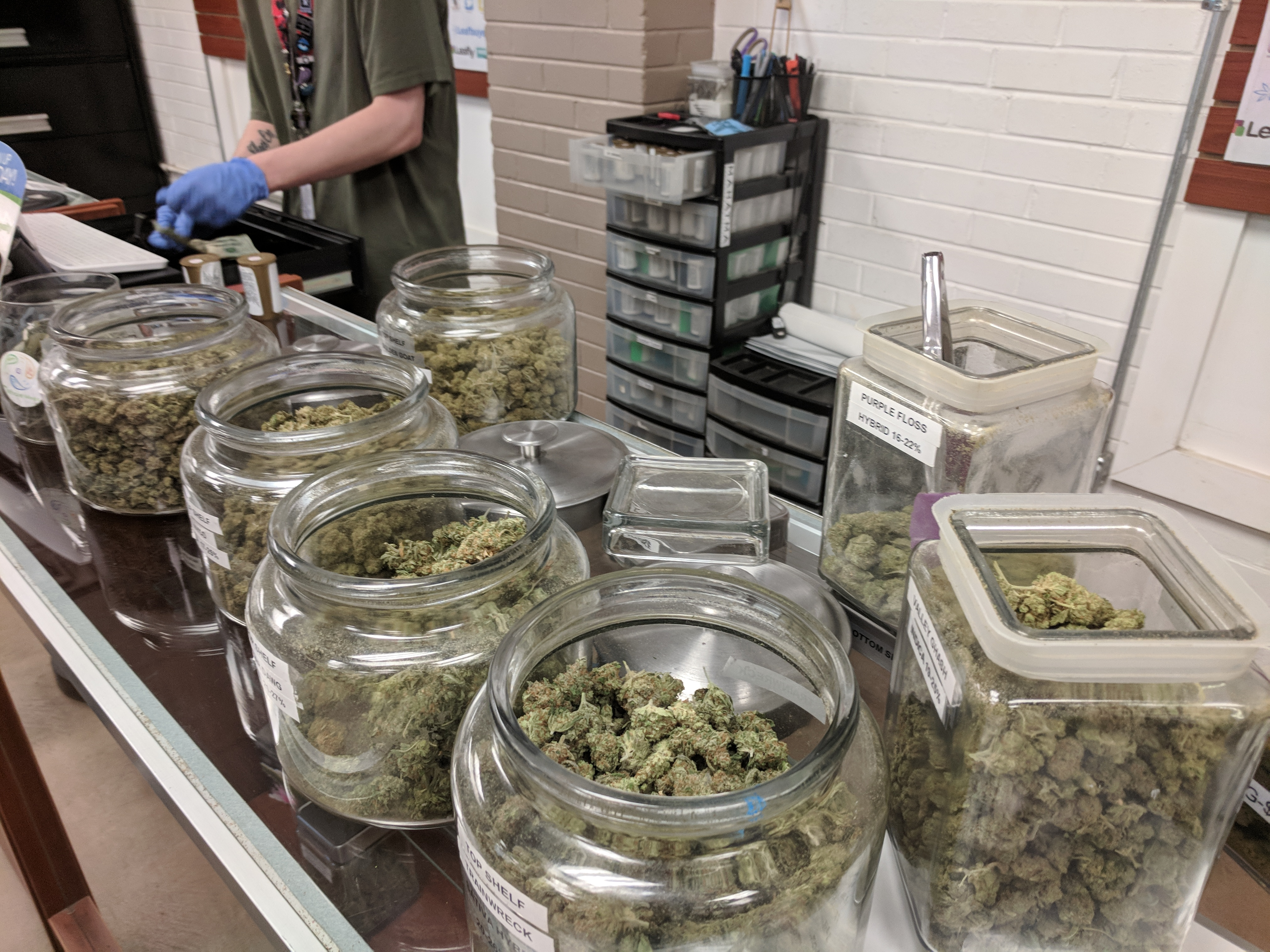
Cannabis flower stored in jars at a dispensary in Colorado

Cannabis dispensaries in the United States or marijuana dispensaries are a type of cannabis retail outlet, local government-regulated physical location, typically inside a retail storefront or office building, in which a person can purchase cannabis and cannabis-related items for medical or recreational use.

First modeled in Amsterdam in the late 1970s where they were innocently called coffeeshops, it would take the Americans more than a generation to successfully duplicate the idea of a retail cannabis storefront. Unlike in the Dutch coffee shops, today most dispensaries do not allow for the smoking or other consumption of cannabis. However, some dispensaries (such as some in California) do have legal permission to set up "cannabars" to allow onsite consumption.

In a traditional medical cannabis dispensary store a patient receives cannabis medication as allowed per the patient's doctor's recommendation. These dispensaries sell cannabis products that have not been approved by the FDA and are not legally registered with the federal government.

As of 2021 there are state-regulated marijuana dispensaries in Alaska, Arizona, Arkansas, California, Colorado, Connecticut, the District of Columbia, Delaware, Florida, Hawaii, Illinois, Louisiana, Maine, Maryland, Massachusetts, Michigan, Minnesota, Missouri, Montana, Nevada, New Hampshire, New Jersey, New Mexico, New York, North Dakota, Ohio, Oklahoma, Oregon, Pennsylvania, Rhode Island, Utah, Vermont, Virginia, and Washington. In California, Native American gaming operations are also intended to include dispensaries going forward.

A cannabis dispensary differs from similar retail stores known as head shops, in that only state-licensed cannabis dispensaries are authorized to sell cannabis.

Approximately 14 US States have drive thru capabilities. These states include; California, Colorado, Illinois, Maryland, Michigan, Missouri, Nevada, New Jersey, Pennsylvania, Ohio, Oklahoma, Oregon, Utah, and Washington

== History ==
The first dispensary San Francisco Cannabis Buyers Club was founded in 1992 by Proposition 215 coauthors "Brownie Mary" Rathbun, Dennis Peron and Dale Gieringer. Shortly after was founded the Berkeley Patients Group, remaining as of 2024 the oldest continuously-operating dispensary in the country.

Washington state became the second state in the U.S. to develop a regulatory framework for marijuana dispensary operators to improve the access to cannabis patients beyond the caregiver model.

The term "marijuana dispensary" in the United States is most often used to refer to private organizations or companies that sell cannabis, particularly in the states of California, Colorado, Washington and Oregon. "Cannabis dispensary" is starting to become a more politically correct term as conscientious people prefer the use of the word cannabis which avoids using the more common Spanish slang word "marijuana".

== Medical dispensaries ==
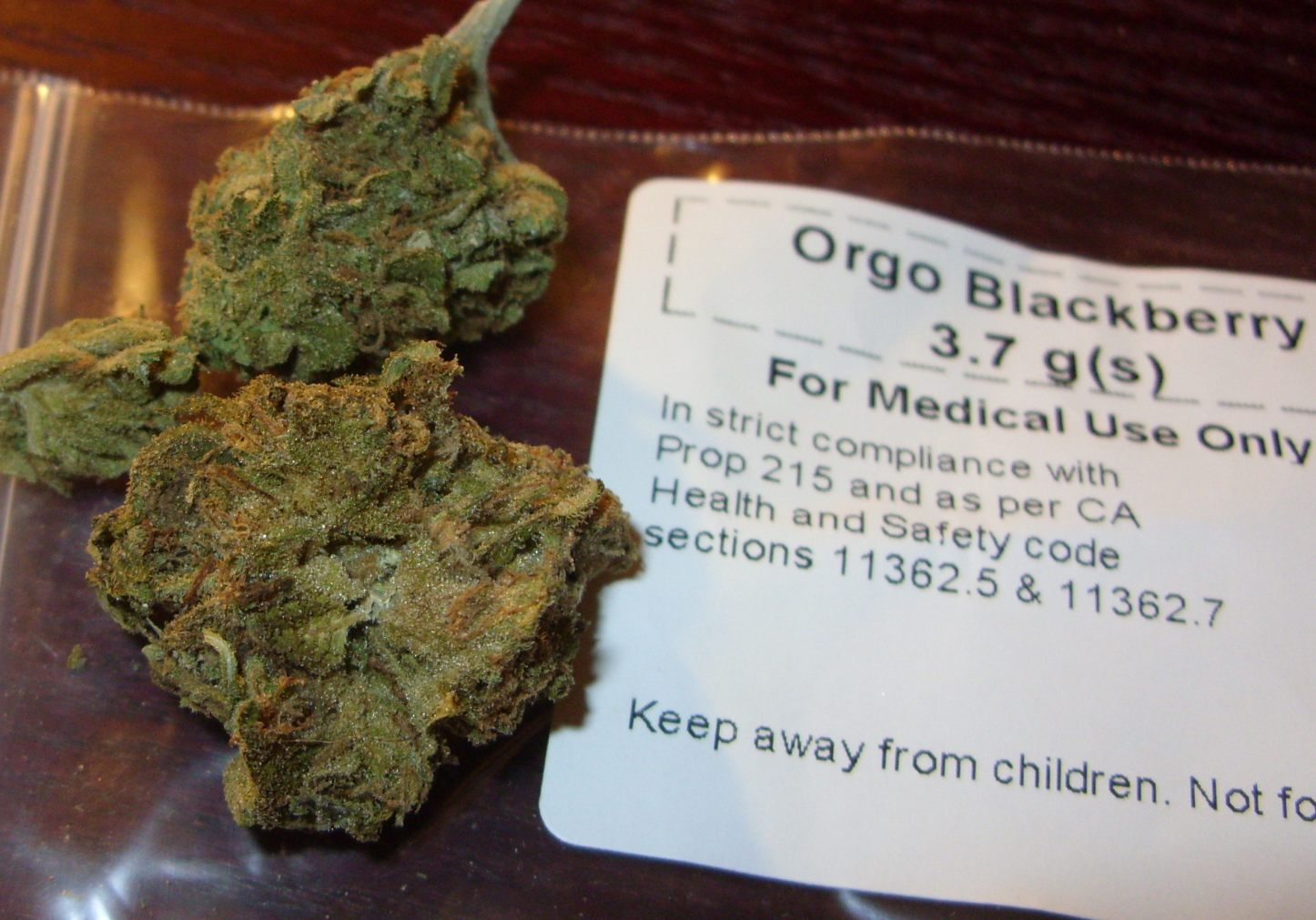
Medical cannabis

Thirty seven of the United States regulate some form of medical cannabis sales despite federal laws. As of 2016 seventeen of those states (Arizona, California, Colorado, Connecticut, Delaware, Illinois, Maine, Michigan, Montana, Nevada, New Jersey, New Mexico, New York, Oklahoma, Oregon, Rhode Island, Washington, and Washington, D.C.) have at least one medical marijuana dispensary, with varying product laws.

The medical dispensaries in these states buy their exit shop products (excluding medical marijuana), like child-proof safety bags, and in-store storage products, from a plethora of new manufacturing companies in mainly China via importers based in the U.S.

The growing need of dispensaries to comply with various legislative laws has given birth to thousands of new products ranging from vials with child locks on them to, to pop top bottles that are childproof and even childproof joint tubes.

For example, under Washington state law, any marijuana products, whether they are edibles, concentrates, or waxes that can be consumed either by inhaling or swallowing must be sold in child-resistant packaging consistent with the regulations of 16 CFR 1700 under the Poison Prevention Packaging Act.

== Recreational dispensaries ==
Colorado was the first state to license a Recreational Dispensary, with 37 stores licensed to sell to adults 21+ on January 1, 2014. The first customer on record to legally purchase marijuana was Sean Azzarati, an Iraq war veteran, who was raising awareness for the cause that PTSD was not a "qualifying condition" for a medical marijuana recommendation in Colorado at the time (PTSD was added to the list of qualifying conditions in 2017).

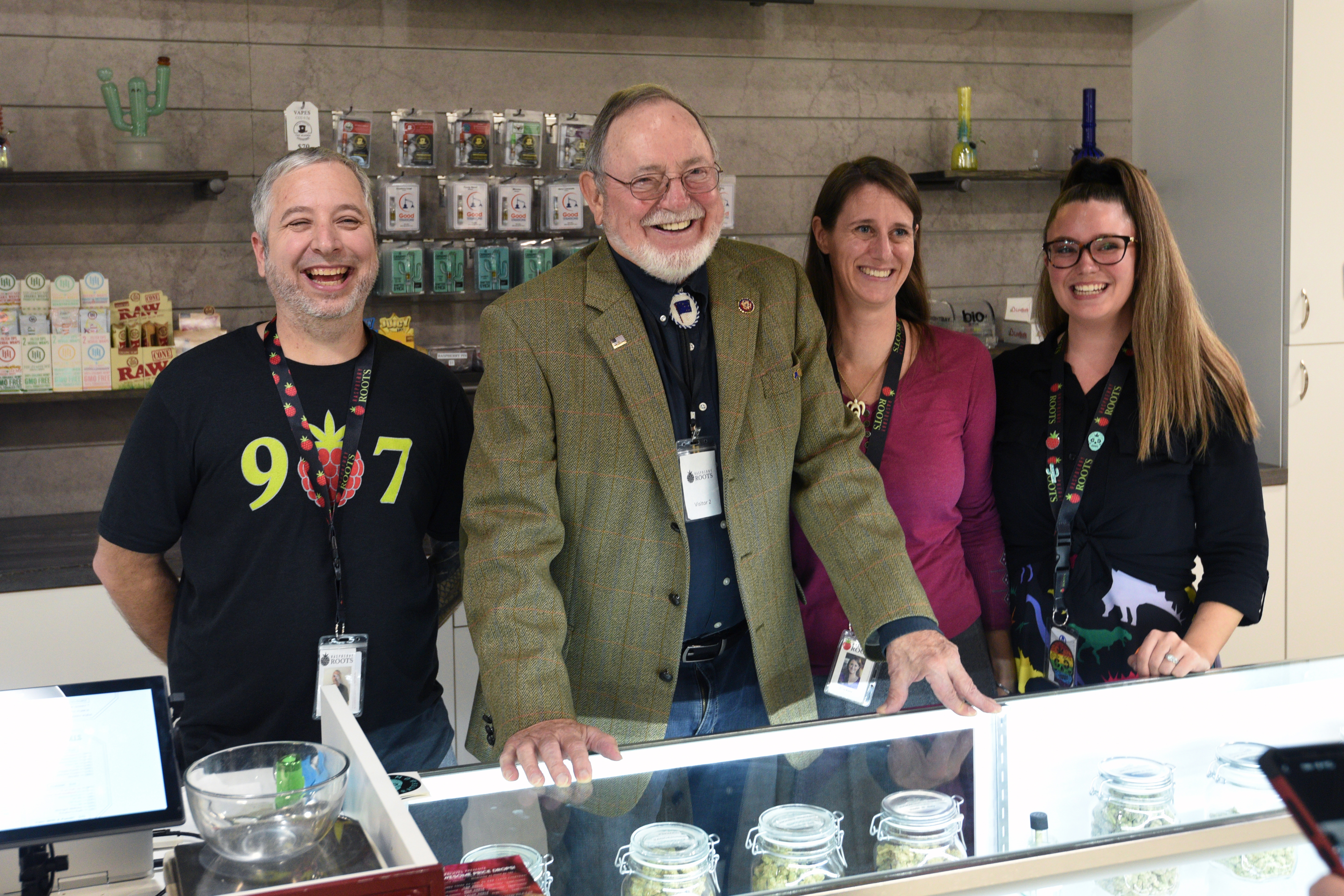
U.S. Representative Don Young tours an Alaska dispensary in 2019

As of March 2024, 25 states regulate recreational dispensaries. A partial list includes Alaska (Alaska Measure 2 (2014)), Arizona (2020 Arizona Proposition 207), California (2018), Colorado (Colorado Amendment 64), Illinois (2020), Maine (2020), Massachusetts (2018), Nevada (2017), Oregon (Oregon Ballot Measure 91 (2014)), Michigan, and Washington (Washington Initiative 502). These are stores where any adult 21+ can enter to purchase cannabis and or cannabis smoking accessories.

== Notable dispensaries ==
Harborside Health Center, Oakland and San Jose, California describes itself as the "largest pot shop" in California and was featured in a four-part reality show.

An economic impact study conducted by the University of Denver examined the Colorado Harvest Company dispensary chain's contribution to tax revenue, jobs, and income to Denver and the state of Colorado.

Kind for Cures was the first shop to make national press by taking over a defunct KFC.

Coachella Valley Church in San Jose, California made national headlines by offering sacramental marijuana to their members.

MedMen's operation grew to include thousands of employees, dozens of retail locations across multiple states in addition to processing and grow facilities; MedMen aims to be the “Apple Store” of weed.

== Locating services ==
As dispensaries grow in popularity, several locating services have been created such as NearGreen, Leafbuyer, Weedmaps, Texas Weed Syndicate, Merry Jane and Leafly

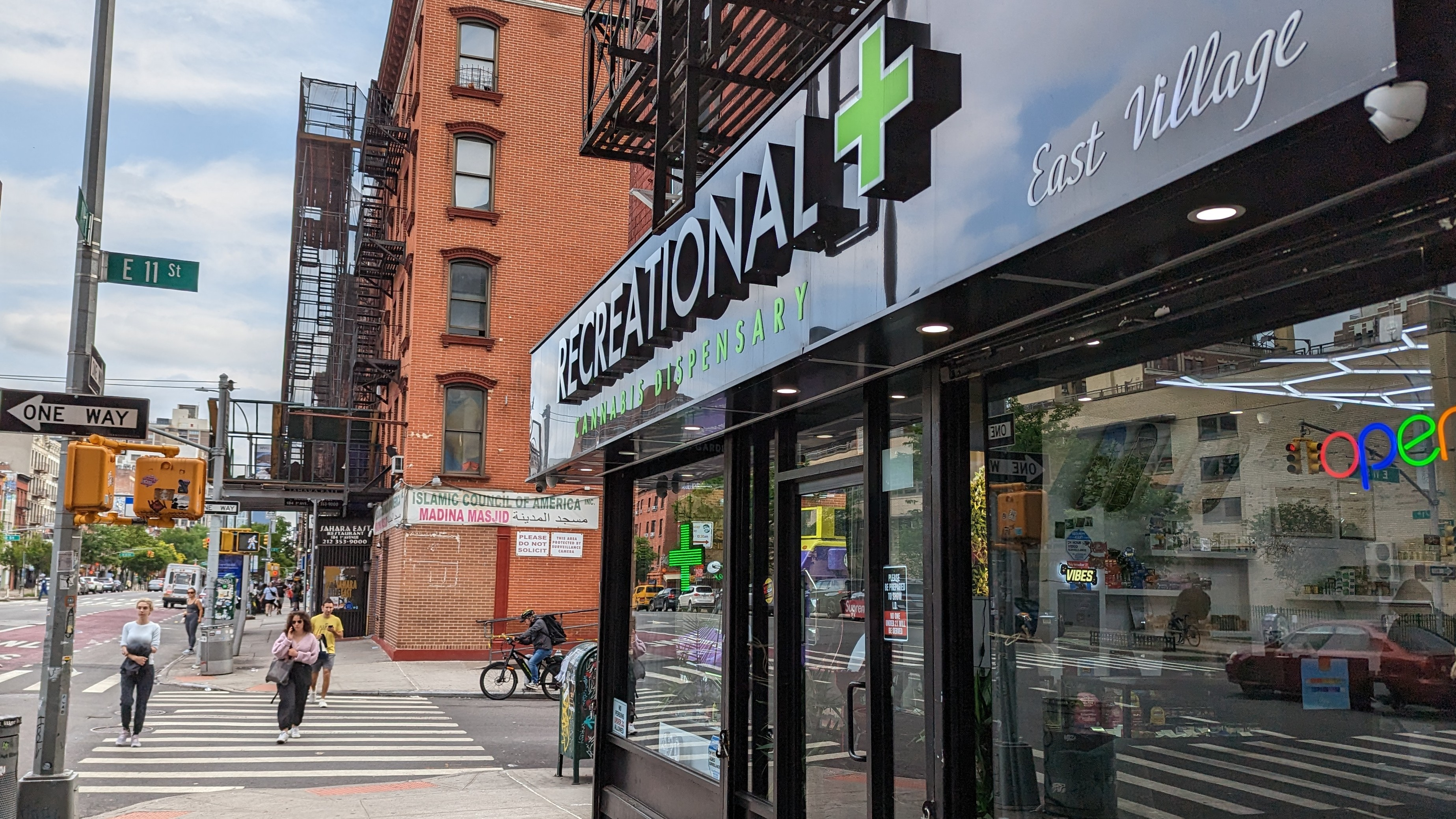
Cannabis dispensary in East Village, New York City

== Case law ==
- United States v. Oakland Cannabis Buyers' Cooperative

== In popular culture ==
Weed Wars is a four-part reality show broadcast on the Discovery Channel which highlights the Harborside Health Center in Oakland California, a medical marijuana dispensary.

The third episode of the 14th season of South Park is named "Medicinal Fried Chicken" and contemplates a marijuana dispensary taking over a recently closed fast-food chicken restaurant named "KFC".

Popular American comedian D. L. Hughley's short-lived and controversial news program on CNN ends with the artist visiting a California dispensary to treat back pain.

== See also ==
- Psychedelic mushroom store

== See also ==
- List of cannabis companies
- Cannabis industry
- Cannabis shop
- Coffeeshop (Netherlands)
- Legality of cannabis
- Legalization of non-medical cannabis in the United States
