= Where's Weed =

American cannibus technology company

- Type: Private company
- Industry: Cannabis technology company
- Founded: 2011; 15 years ago
- Headquarters: Denver, Colorado,, United States
- Key people: Tyler Bartholomew (CEO/Co-founder); David Lindauer (President/Co-founder); Bill Anders (CMO/Co-founder)
- Website: www.wheresweed.com

Where's Weed is an American cannabis technology company known for connecting medical and recreational cannabis users with trusted local marijuana businesses in their communities.

== History ==
Where's Weed was founded in 2011 with its headquarters located in Denver, Colorado. Tyler Bartholomew is the current CEO and one of the co-founders of the company. The company launched the Where's Weed Android app in 2014 and released the iOS version in 2015.

== Services ==
Where's Weed offers marijuana enthusiasts the platform to search, discover and share marijuana businesses and products in their local communities. The Where's Weed mobile apps help users search for both medical and recreational marijuana dispensaries, strains and products.

== See also ==
- Cannabis (drug)
- Cannabis in the United States
- Cannabis dispensaries in the United States
- Legality of cannabis by U.S. jurisdiction
- Cannabis in California
- Medical cannabis
- Medical cannabis in the United States
