= ChefVille =

2012 video game

- Developer: Zynga
- Platform: Internet
- Release: August 2012
- Genre: Social simulation game
- Mode: Single-player with multiplayer interaction

ChefVille is a defunct multiplayer restaurant simulation social network game created by Zynga. The game was announced at Zynga's June 2012 Unleashed event, debuted August 2012 on Facebook, and was released October 3, 2012 on Zynga.com. Within the first month of its release, ChefVille had become the No. 1 Facebook game. As of early October 2012, ChefVille had more than 4.8 million daily active users (DAU) and more than 45 million monthly active users (MAU).

On March 31, 2015, Zynga announced ChefVille would be one of 11 games to be closed.

== History ==
ChefVille is Zynga's second game in the restaurant genre following Café World, a Facebook game with 456,000 DAU and 2.4 million MAU as of early October 2012. The main differences are that ChefVille players interact with the environment outside their virtual restaurant and earn real recipes as they progress in the game. ChefVille is available for free in 17 languages on Facebook.

== Gameplay ==
ChefVille players act as chef, restaurant owner, designer and manager with the goal of creating a ‘dream restaurant.’ Players customize restaurants to specific themes, such as a 1950s diner or an Italian restaurant, and they mix and match food types while cooking and serving. Players also choose the restaurant décor, from sushi stations and cold stations to woks and grills, and cook menu items that correlate with their cooking equipment.

Similar to other Zynga ‘ville’ games, players are given tools needed to build their restaurants. Players cook dishes using various appliances, such as a brick oven for cooking pizza. As the game progresses, players help friends by sharing needed recipe ingredients, by dining in their friends’ restaurants, and by helping friends build their restaurants. Players can also purchase food and ingredients with actual currency.

With ChefVille’s ‘Game to Table’ feature, players who master a dish can receive a recipe for that dish by email. At the time of launch, the game included more than 200 in-game recipes, 50 of which players could earn. Game recipes include Confit de Canard with Potatoes au Gratin, Miso Soup, Bruschetta and Roasted Asparagus with Hollandaise. ChefVille recipes are created by Zynga Executive Chef Matthew Du Trumble and his team of 15 company chefs. Zynga CEO Mark Pincus and his wife contributed a Spaghetti Bolognese recipe to the game. Players also have the ability to show off their own recipes in the game.

ChefVille takes place on a map segmented into a grid, with new areas unlocked as players meet milestones or spend actual currency. Recipe ingredients are obtained from raw materials acquired from visiting spots on the map, such as a butcher for fresh beef, a milk truck for fresh milk, and a breadbox for bread.

== Currency ==
ChefVille players earn rewards and receive help from friends for free. They can also use actual currency to buy recipe ingredients or borrow food from friends by dining in their restaurants.

== Partnerships ==
On September 19, 2012, Zynga and Food Network announced a promotion in which celebrity chef Robert Irvine appeared as a virtual avatar within the game. For two weeks, virtual Robert Irvine guided ChefVille players through a series of quests and helped players enhance their in-game restaurants.
