= Medicinal Fried Chicken =

- South Park episode
- Episode no.: Season 14; Episode 3
- Directed by: Trey Parker
- Written by: Trey Parker
- Production code: 1403
- Original air date: March 31, 2010

Episode chronology
← Previous "The Tale of Scrotie McBoogerballs"	Next → "You Have 0 Friends"
- South Park season 14

"Medicinal Fried Chicken" is the third episode of the fourteenth season of the American animated television series South Park, and the 198th episode of the series overall. It originally aired on Comedy Central in the United States on March 31, 2010. In the episode, the South Park KFC is replaced by a medical marijuana dispensary, and Cartman gets involved in black market selling the KFC chicken. Meanwhile, Randy Marsh gets a medical referral for marijuana by giving himself testicular cancer, which makes his testicles grow to grotesquely huge proportions.

The episode was written and directed by series co-creator Trey Parker. "Medicinal Fried Chicken" was first broadcast when Detroit was considering revising state cannabis laws and restricting fast food eateries. The episode provided social commentary against both types of laws, and suggested legislating lifestyle choices is ineffective and inevitably leads to black markets.

The illegal fast food market subplot was heavily influenced by the 1983 film Scarface, with Cartman resembling fictional drug lord Tony Montana and KFC founder Colonel Sanders as antagonist Alejandro Sosa. The episode also included several jokes about Pope Benedict XVI and the child sexual abuse scandals that had been surrounding the Catholic Church at the time. The concept of a former KFC restaurant becoming a marijuana dispensary came from a news story about a real marijuana dispensary in Palms, Los Angeles, built at a site formerly housing a Kentucky Fried Chicken franchise.

"Medicinal Fried Chicken" received generally positive reviews, with many commentators praising the social commentary and sophomoric testicle jokes alike. According to Media Research, the episode was seen by 2.99 million viewers, making it one of the most successful cable programs of the week. Although a KFC spokesman had a lukewarm response to "Medicinal Fried Chicken", officials from the KFC hometown of Corbin, Kentucky were pleased the city was featured in the episode.

== Plot ==
New state laws prohibiting fast food in low-income areas cause the closure of all KFC locations in Colorado, much to the fury of Cartman, who is addicted to the food. When Randy Marsh learns that South Park's sole KFC is now a medical marijuana dispensary, he attempts to give himself cancer so he can get a doctor's referral for marijuana after first gaining a clean bill of health from his doctor since he had assumed permits are given to the healthy. After some research and a few unsuccessful attempts, Randy successfully gives himself testicular cancer by irradiating his scrotum with a microwave oven, making his testicles grow so large that he has to use a wheelbarrow to carry them. Randy obtains his medical referral and starts smoking marijuana regularly. Meanwhile, his testicles continue to grow to the point that he uses them as a hopper ball. Randy finds that his larger testicles are rather attractive to women, including his wife, Sharon Marsh, so he encourages his friends to also get testicular cancer. The local doctor, unaware of the self-induced nature of the cancer, becomes convinced that a recent change in South Park is responsible for the cancer outbreak.

Meanwhile, after receiving treatment for KFC withdrawal, Cartman is introduced to Billy Miller, a local boy who runs an illegal KFC cartel from his home. Billy hires Cartman to sell his illegal food, a job that provides Cartman with the same food as payment. After Cartman demonstrates his ruthlessness against a cheating street dealer (in which Cartman discovers the gravy to be cut with Boston Market gravy), Billy sends him and another employee, Tommy, to Corbin, Kentucky to buy chicken directly from Colonel Sanders. Sanders is impressed by Cartman but has Tommy executed after discovering him to be a mole for healthy foods advocate Jamie Oliver. Cartman wins over the Colonel's trust but is warned to never betray him. Cartman eventually betrays Billy by telling Billy's mother that he failed his social studies test, and takes over the cartel after Billy is punished. The Colonel assigns Cartman the task of assassinating Oliver to prevent him from giving a speech in the United Nations. However, the gluttonous Cartman soon comes to abuse the food he is assigned to sell and forgets the Colonel's assassination order. The Colonel, furious at Cartman's incompetence, sends a squad of gunmen to kill him, leading to a gunfight with the police that kills Billy's mother, and Cartman escapes unscathed.

Randy's testicles grow so large that he is unable to fit through the doors of the marijuana dispensary. Prohibited by law from purchasing marijuana outside the premises, Randy and the other irradiated men begin protesting for larger marijuana dispensary doors. As politicians discuss the issue, the marijuana dispensary owner suggests that marijuana simply be legalized, arguing that people are abusing the medicinal system anyway. A local doctor then opines that the ban on KFC had led to the rise in testicular cancer because the chicken was somehow preventing it. Colorado completely bans marijuana once again and then allows KFC to reopen locations in the state, which are now re-branded as "Medicinal Fried Chicken." Randy has his cancerous testicles removed and replaced with prosthetic ones, and has the skin from his removed cancerous testicles made into a full-length scrotum coat for Sharon.

== Production ==
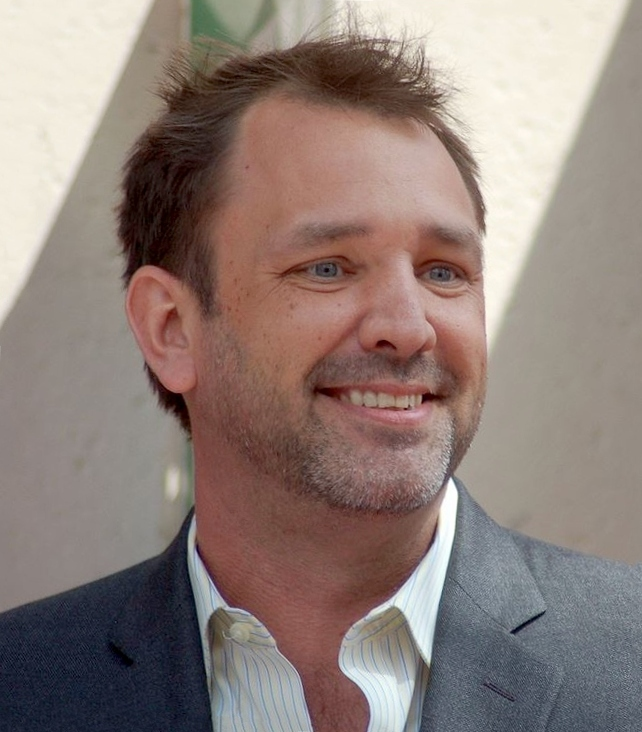
South Park co-creator Trey Parker wrote "Medicinal Fried Chicken"

"Medicinal Fried Chicken" was written and directed by series co-creator Trey Parker and was rated TV-MA in the United States. It originally aired on Comedy Central in the United States on March 31, 2010. The episode was first broadcast around the same time a great deal of discussion regarding marijuana laws had been generated in Colorado, where South Park is set and where Parker and fellow series co-creator Matt Stone are from. The state had a medicinal marijuana law that allowed patients to obtain cards to purchase marijuana legally, but as of March 2010, an average of 1,000 people were applying for the cards each day, and many of the applications were of questionable validity and intent. As a result, state officials had been considering whether to revise the medicinal marijuana law, and "Medicinal Fried Chicken" was likely influenced by those discussions. The episode was also based on new Colorado health care laws that threatened to put restrictions on fast food restaurants in the state.

== Cultural references ==
The fried chicken fast food restaurant KFC is featured prominently in "Medicinal Fried Chicken". The concept of a former KFC restaurant becoming a medicinal marijuana store mirrors that of a real life marijuana dispensary in the Palms community of Los Angeles, California. The store, called Kind for Cures, is abbreviated K.F.C. on its exterior signs and resembles the KFC fast food eateries in appearance, which has drawn national media attention to the marijuana dispensary. Colonel Harland Sanders, the founder of KFC who died in 1980 but is still used heavily in the chain's advertisements, is portrayed as a living character in "Medicinal Fried Chicken", with his trafficking in illegal fast food likening him to a drug kingpin, and Corbin, Kentucky, the home town of the first Kentucky Fried Chicken, depicted to resemble a South American hacienda/narcoplantation.

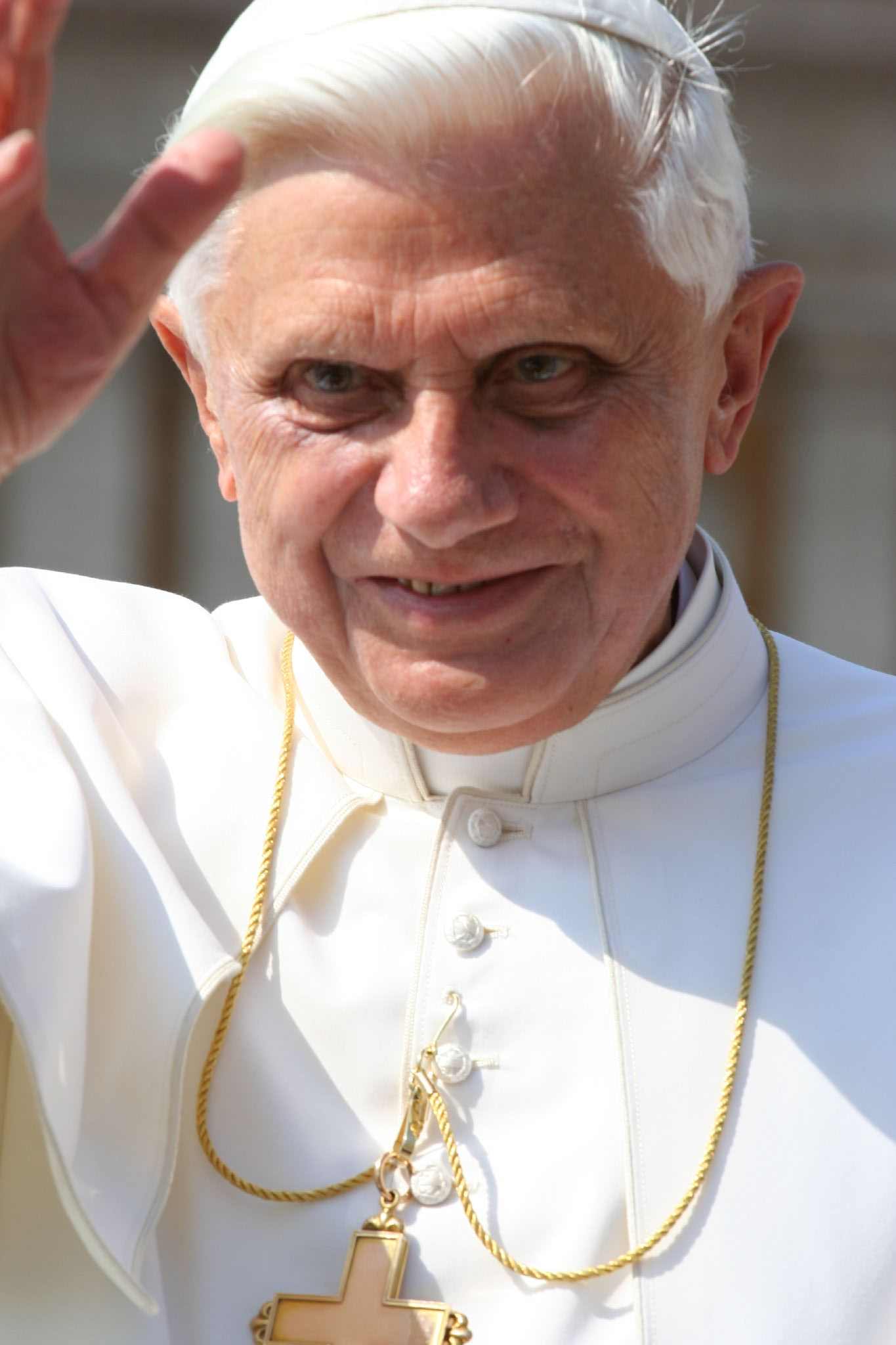
"Medicinal Fried Chicken" includes several jokes about Pope Benedict XVI and the child sexual abuse scandals surrounding the Catholic Church

"Medicinal Fried Chicken" includes several jokes about Pope Benedict XVI and the child sexual abuse scandals that surrounded the Catholic Church when the episode first aired. On three occasions, Cartman uses expanded and modified versions of idiomatic phrases, such as "is the Pope Catholic?", "does a bear shit in the woods?", and their combination, "does the Pope shit in the woods?", which are rhetorical questions used in response to a question where the answer is an emphatic yes. Thus, Cartman implies an affirmative response to questions such as: "Does the pope help pedophiles get away with their crimes?" and "Is the Pope Catholic? And making the world safe for pedophiles?" These are references to allegations that Pope Benedict XVI ignored warnings and concealed evidence that Rev. Peter Hullermann engaged in several acts of child sexual abuse under the future Pope's watch as Archbishop of Munich and Freising in the 1980s. During another scene, Cartman says, "Does a bear crap in the woods? And does the Pope crap on the broken lives and dreams of 200 deaf boys?" This is a reference to reports that Pope Benedict XVI failed to act to reports that Father Lawrence C. Murphy molested up to 200 deaf boys during his time at the St John's Catholic School for the Deaf.

Cartman's involvement with the fried chicken black market closely mirrors the plot of the 1983 crime film Scarface, with Cartman in the role of Tony Montana, Billy in the role of Frank, Tommy in the role of Omar, and Colonel Sanders in the role of Alejandro Sosa. In the episode, Cartman travels to Corbin, Kentucky to meet a dealer, usurps the illegal operation from his local boss, and is ultimately brought down because he becomes addicted to his own product, plot points that mirror the plot of Scarface. Specific scenes patterned after ones in Scarface, include one in which Cartman watches Tommy (whose appearance is based on Tommy Vercetti from Grand Theft Auto: Vice City) being executed by being hanged from a helicopter, and the final scene in which Cartman's compound is attacked by gunmen. The episode also includes references to the 1991 crime film New Jack City.

Colonel Sanders orders Cartman to assassinate Jamie Oliver, a British celebrity chef known for his campaign against fast food, as shown in his show Jamie Oliver's Food Revolution. Throughout the episode, Cartman is critical of fast food fried chicken eateries that compete with KFC. This includes Church's Chicken, which he said "tastes like cat shit", and Boston Market, when a dealer unsuccessfully tries to pass Boston Market gravy off as KFC gravy to Cartman. Randy says he wants to induce cancer and get medicinal marijuana in time to attend a concert by reggae singer Ziggy Marley.

== Release and reception ==
In its original American broadcast on March 31, 2010, "Medicinal Fried Chicken" was watched by 2.99 million viewers, according to Nielsen Media Research, making it the most watched cable television show of the night, and one of the top performing cable programs of the week. Although a slight drop from the 3.24 million viewers of the previous week's episode, "The Tale of Scrotie McBoogerballs", the viewership for "Medicinal Fried Chicken" was considered a strong showing. The episode received an overall 1.9 rating/3 share, meaning that it was seen by 1.9% of the population, and 3% of people watching television at the time of the broadcast. Among viewers between ages 18 and 49, it received a 1.7 rating/5 share, and among male viewers between 18 and 34, it received a 3.1 rating/11 share. "Medicinal Fried Chicken", along with the thirteen other episodes from South Park's fourteenth season, were released on a three-disc DVD set and two-disc Blu-ray set in the United States on April 26, 2011.

It's silliness to the max. That's what South Park does: takes our initial assumptions, pushes them to the limits, and shows us how ludicrous [they] really can be.

— Carlos Delgado
iF Magazine

The A.V. Club writer Josh Modell said "Medicinal Fried Chicken" served as a good social satire without becoming too preachy. Modell particularly enjoyed that the other South Park men joined Randy in his absurd testicular cancer scheme, but said the Cartman subplot and drug film parody "fell a little flat". Ramsley Isler of IGN said the giant testes jokes were "brilliantly ludicrous", and did not grow old despite running throughout the length of the episode. Isler praised the ending scene with the scrotum skin coat, and said when Cartman snorted chicken skin like cocaine, "the episode reached a whole new level [of] hilarity". TV Fanatic declared the episode "perfection" and felt it was an improvement over the previous fourteenth season episodes "Sexual Healing" and "The Tale of Scrotie McBoogerballs". The site also praised the episode for use gross-out comedy like enlarged testicles for social satire as well as humor. Carlos Delgado of iF Magazine praised the humor, the references to Scarface and the social commentary, of which he said: "The points were smart, articulate, and, in true South Park style, completely off the wall".

When asked how KFC felt about their portrayal in "Medicinal Fried Chicken", company spokesman Ricky Maynard said only: "As you might expect, KFC Corporation was not contacted by Comedy Central for permission to use our brand in South Park. We had absolutely no say in the show's content." Corbin Tourism Chairperson Suzie Razmus viewed the association of Corbin with KFC as positive publicity, regardless of the show's tone. The city embarked on a campaign to capitalize on its connections to KFC and Colonel Sanders, and Sharae Myers, the city's Main Street manager, said of the episode, "One thing I think is great is that Corbin got the recognition: that the mecca for KFC is in Corbin."
