= Kind for Cures =

Medical marijuana dispensary in Los Angeles, California

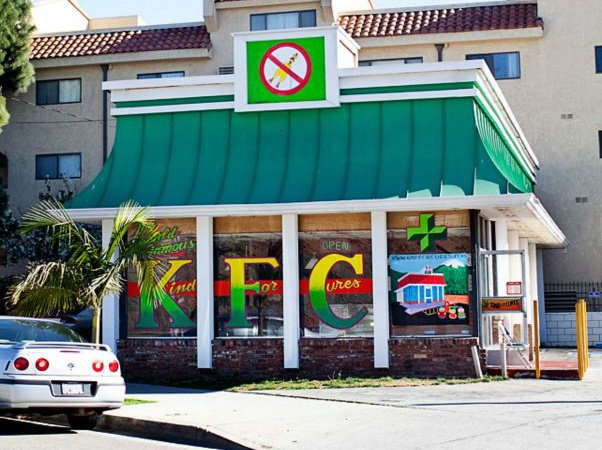
- Type: Private
- Industry: Marijuana dispensary
- Founded: 2009 in Los Angeles, California
- Defunct: June of 2015
- Headquarters: 9850 Exposition Blvd; Los Angeles, California 90034

Kind for Cures was a medicinal marijuana dispensary located in the Palms neighborhood of Los Angeles County. The marijuana dispensary inhabited a building that was previously occupied by a Kentucky Fried Chicken. The store opened in 2009 and the owners' decision to keep the same KFC acronym garnered national media attention, including being the inspiration for an episode of South Park in 2010. However, on June 10, 2015, the owners were ordered to shut down the business by the afternoon of June 11, 2015.

== History ==
Originally KFC kept the traditional red roof, as seen in South Park, until YUM Corporation threatened to file a lawsuit against the KFC owners, citing trademark infringement against the Colonel's famous red mansard roof. YUM agreed to paint the roof green for the owners in 2010. Scrap metal from the original Kentucky Fried Chicken oven ranges was used to create the interior designs inside the showroom. The original floor, counters and food refrigerators also remain to keep the originality and humor intact. LA Weekly called the owners' marketing a "genius" strategy and KFC won "The Best Re-Appropriation of a Fast Food Restaurant Award" in LA Weekly's "Best Of 2009" Publication. A northern California marijuana dispensary tried to copy the KFC marketing strategy in August 2010 by donning the same acronym and trying to lease a KFC in the state of Maine, but it was denied.

== South Park episode ==
The third episode of the 14th season of the animated show South Park parodies the real life circumstances surrounding the establishment of Kind For Cures. In the episode titled "Medicinal Fried Chicken", Cartman gets involved in the black market selling of fried chicken when the South Park KFC is replaced with a marijuana dispensary. Kind for Cures subsequently incorporated the South Park publicity into its theme. A mural of the South Park pot shop was painted on the store front window of Kind for Cures by Los Angeles artist Kimberley Edwards (The Window Goddess) whose bright signage adorned the windows of the colorful dispensary. Also, there were cutouts of the South Park characters posted throughout the inside of the shop, in addition to the selling of South Park merchandise. The marijuana dispensary even named a few marijuana strains after South Park characters, including Kenny's Cat Piss, Stan's Wet Dream and South Park Kush.

== KFC in the media ==
KFC has been written about in numerous media outlets, and appeared on the cover of many national magazines.

- Los Angeles Times
- LA Weekly
- Washington Post
- Culture Magazine
- High Times Magazine
- 420 Times Magazine
- The Consumerist
- Maine Observer
- Reason Magazine

== Legal compliance ==
Kind for Cures was in strict compliance with California Proposition 215 (passed in 1996) and California Senate Bill 420 (passed in 2004). Each marijuana dispensary member had to provide Kind for Cures a valid California identification card and a valid original recommendation from a licensed California physician. Only under those guidelines could Kind for Cures offer a variety of medical marijuana strains in the form of Indica, Sativa, and Hybrid. In addition, the shop offered concentrates, edibles, tinctures, and drinks.
