= Planet 13 Holdings =

Cannabis company based in Nevada, United States

- Traded as: CSE: PLTH and OTCQX: PLNH
- Industry: Cannabis
- Headquarters: Nevada, United States
- Key people: Robert Groesbeck (Chairman and Co-CEO); Larry Scheffler (Chairman and Co-CEO)
- Products: Medical cannabis, Recreational cannabis, vape pens and smoking accessories
- Brands: Planet 13 Las Vegas, Medizin, Trendi, Leaf & Vine, Purc, Planet M
- Website: https://www.planet13holdings.com

Planet 13 Holdings, Inc. is a cannabis company based in Nevada, United States. On Nov 1, 2018, the company opened its cannabis dispensary in Las Vegas which became the largest cannabis dispensary in the world at 112,000 square feet.

The company operates through Planet 13 Cannabis Superstore & Entertainment Complex as well other sub-brands like Medizin, Trendi, Leaf & Vine, PURC and Planet M. The product portfolio of the brands are primarily cannabis products while PURC is a coffee brand.

The company expanded across the United States and had dispensaries in Orange County, California, Florida, and Illinois.

== History ==
Planet 13 Holdings is run by its two CEOs Bob Groesbeck and Larry Scheffler, who are both former politicians. Groesbeck served as the mayor of Henderson, 16 miles away from Las Vegas, from 1993 to 1997, and Scheffler served as a councilman for Henderson.

The company has a cultivation license in Nevada with a capacity of 950 kg per year. It also has two retail licenses to sell both medical and recreational cannabis.

The company opened a retail outlet near the Las Vegas Strip in 2018. It was the largest cannabis dispensary in the world measured by square footage at 40,000. It serves an average of 3,575 customers per day. It is open 24 hours seven days a week.

In 2021, Planet 13 Holdings purchased a medical marijuana subsidiary of Harvest Health and Recreation for $55 million. The store will be known at Planet 13 Florida. In 2022, the company purchased Next Green Wave to expand operations in California.

In July 2021, the company opened Planet 13 Orange County in Santa Ana, California. The largest dispensary in California, it features an 89-foot digital waterfall, a computerized interactive beach, and a 16-foot octopus sculpture. In 2025, they sold the money losing location to Catalyst Cannabis who planned to extensively reduce the size of the store.
