= Peter Hullermann =

German Catholic priest (born 1947)

Peter Hullermann (born 5 October 1947, in Gelsenkirchen) is a German Catholic priest who sexually abused countless boys in the 1970s and 1980s. His case has attracted particular interest because of the alleged involvement of Cardinal Joseph Ratzinger, then serving as Archbishop of Munich and Freising. Ratzinger later became Pope Benedict XVI.

== Background ==
In December 1977, Hullermann was assigned as a chaplain to St Andreas Church in Essen. In 1979, at a camp retreat, he forced an 11-year-old boy to perform oral sex on him. Three further allegations of abuse against minors were filed against him. In response, the priest supervising Hullermann informed the church authorities in Essen that he had made "indecent advances" towards children in the parish.

Hullermann admitted the accusations against him. In accordance with then-standard procedure within the Church, the allegations were not reported to police but instead Hullermann was removed from his parish assignment and sent to undergo psychiatric therapy. Because the psychiatrist was located in Munich, Hullermann was formally transferred to the archdiocese of Munich and Freising headed by Ratzinger. The diocese of Essen explicitly informed its counterpart in Munich that Hullermann had sexually abused children.

In a meeting chaired by Archbishop Ratzinger on January 15, 1980, the archdiocese of Munich and Freising gave formal approval to the transfer and provided Hullermann accommodation in a parish house in Munich while undergoing therapy.

== Assignment to pastoral work in Munich ==
The psychiatrist treating Hullermann, Dr Werner Huth, set three conditions when he started treating Hullermann: the priest should not be allowed to work with children, he should give up alcohol (because he allegedly committed the acts of abuse when he was drunk), and he must be supervised at all times by a mentor. The doctor said he made these requirements clear to church officials during a number of conversations, including an auxiliary bishop in the archdiocese of Munich and Freising. However, he did not speak directly to Ratzinger. In the event, none of these conditions were fulfilled.

On February 1, 1980, soon after his therapy began, Hullermann was assigned to an unrestricted pastoral ministry at a Munich parish, including work with children. The reassignment was carried out in a memorandum written by Fr. Gerhard Gruber, who at the time served as the vicar general of the Archdiocese of Munich.

In March 2010, Gruber assumed full responsibility for the decision to readmit Hullermann to pastoral care work, emphasizing that he made this decision on his own, without consulting the cardinal, saying "The repeated employment of [Hullermann] in parish ministry was a grave mistake. I take full responsibility for it." However, The New York Times reported on March 24, 2010, that Ratzinger had been copied on Gruber's memo, and the archdiocese confirmed that Ratzinger's office had received a copy. The Rev. Lorenz Wolf told The New York Times that the Gruber memo was routine and was "unlikely to have landed on the archbishop’s desk", although he was unable to say for certain that Ratzinger had not read it.

In April 2010, German magazine Der Spiegel, citing a private letter written by Gruber to a circle of friends, reported that he had received numerous phone calls from the archdiocese "begging" him to take sole blame for the reassignment, and that he had been faxed a prepared statement to sign. A spokesman for the archdiocese called Der Spiegel's report "completely made up", and added that Gruber had been assisted in formulating his statement, but had not been forced to sign anything. Gruber's letter also justified the reassignment of Hullermann, despite the explicit warning against this course of action from his psychiatrist, on the grounds that Dr Huth "had not ruled out" a positive outcome.

In a subsequent telephone interview with The Wall Street Journal, Gruber repeated his assumption of full responsibility for the assignment, and said that he did not discuss the matter with Ratzinger. Gruber said that at that time, it was common to give a priest another chance if he expressed regret and was determined to be rehabilitated.

== Subsequent history ==
In February 1982, Ratzinger left the archdiocese of Munich and Freising to take up his appointment in Rome as prefect of the Congregation for the Doctrine of the Faith.

In August 1982, Hullermann was reassigned to the town of Grafing near Munich. From September 1984 he taught religion in a public secondary school there for six hours a week. In January 1985, he was relieved of his duties after a police investigation into suspected sexual misconduct. In June 1986, the priest was convicted of sexually abusing minors, and distributing pornography, in Grafing. He was fined 4,000 deutschmarks, given an 18-month suspended sentence and 5 years probation.

After serving as chaplain to an old people's home for a year, Hullermann was then reassigned around 1987 to Garching an der Alz, where he worked as a curate and parish administrator for more than 20 years. In this post he had regular contact with children and supervised 150 altar-boys. Some parents complained that he kissed their children on the mouth, but nothing was done about this behavior.

In 2006, one of Hullermann's Essen victims saw pictures of Hullermann, still working with children, on the internet. The victim sent a series of email demands for money to Hullermann, who informed his superiors. The police then investigated the victim on blackmail charges. This incident brought Hullermann to the attention of church officials investigating sexual abuse, who in April 2008 contacted the victim to confirm his story. Church officials subsequently contacted Dr Huth, who was "horrified" to hear that Hullermann was still working with children.

Hullermann was transferred in 2008 to Bad Tölz as a chaplain for tourists and ordered not to have contact with youths. Despite these orders, he conducted church services involving young people. The priest in charge of Hullerman at Bad Tölz said that his superiors had given him no warning of Hullermann's history of child abuse. Parishioners at Bad Tölz described Hullermann as friendly, down to earth and popular with churchgoers, especially children and teenagers.

On March 12, 2010, the newspaper Süddeutsche Zeitung broke the story, and three days later Hullermann was suspended from his post in Bad Tölz on the grounds that he had ignored the order not to work with young people. Joseph Obermaier, the responsible chief of the department of pastoral of the archdiocese who had reassigned Hullermann to Bad Tölz, resigned in the wake of the revelations, admitting to "grave errors".

According to a statement issued by the archdiocese of Munich and Freising at the time of Hullermann's suspension, there has been "no evidence of recent sexual abuses, similar to those for which he was convicted in 1986". Later that month, a further allegation of abuse, dating from 1998 in Garching, had been filed and sent to state prosecutors.
