= Café World =

Defunct online video game

- Developer: Zynga
- Type: Multiplayer social simulation game
- Launched: September 30, 2009
- Discontinued: July 22, 2014
- Platform: Facebook

Café World is a defunct multiplayer restaurant simulation social network game created by Zynga and launched in September 2009. It quickly became the fastest growing social game ever, reaching 8 million users in seven days, and peaked at over 10 million daily active users, which made it Zynga's third-largest game after FarmVille and CityVille. Available on Facebook, players strive to become master chefs and build a food empire by completing catering orders.

== History ==
In celebration of the first anniversary, players were challenged to complete a "One Year Anniversary Party" order with five new cookbook recipes. Players who successfully completed the order were entered for a chance to win a trip for two to New York City.

Following the Japan earthquake in March 2011, Zynga re-released several Japanese-themed decorations to Café World in order to benefit Japan's Save the Children Earthquake Emergency Fund.

To celebrate the second anniversary, players were challenged to complete a goal series to prepare a feast for British Royals. Players who successfully completed the goal series were entered for a chance to win a trip to Britain.

In 2012, the game attracted approximately 2.6 million monthly active users. It was a freemium game, meaning there is no cost to play, but players had the option of purchasing premium content.

Zynga announced on May 23, 2014, that it would be closing the game on July 22. On July 23, Café World was completely removed from Facebook.
