= Cannabis retail outlet =

Location at which marijuana is sold

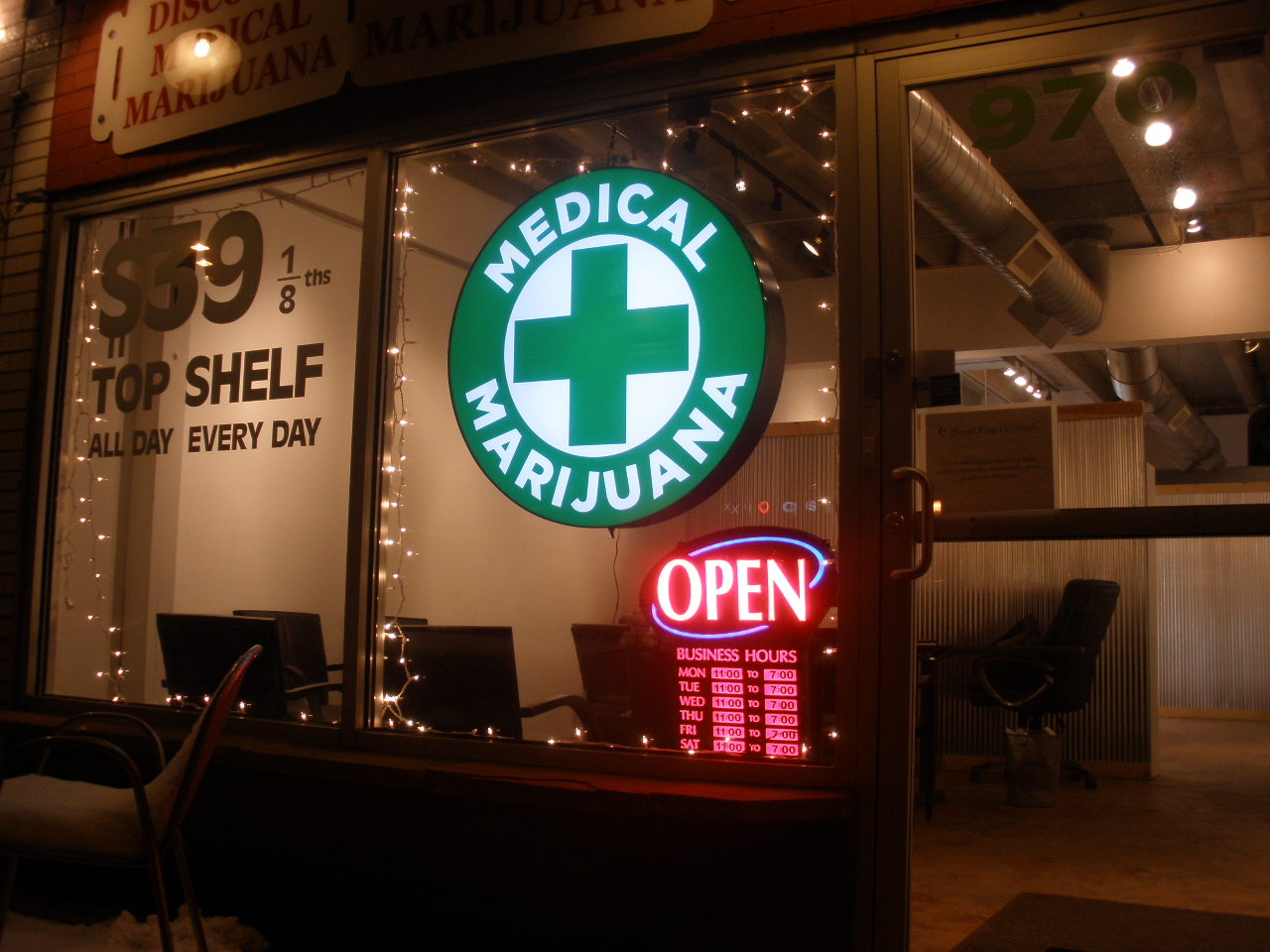
A medical cannabis dispensary in Denver, Colorado

A cannabis retail outlet (also known as cannabis shop, cannabis dispensary, cannabis store, cannabis cooperative) is a location at which cannabis is sold or otherwise dispensed, either for recreational or for medical use.

Due to the complex legal regimes surrounding cannabis, cannabis shops have different names and modalities depending on the jurisdiction. In the Netherlands these are called "coffeeshops". In the United States they exist as outlets often called dispensaries for both recreational and medical use. In other jurisdictions like Malta, Spain, Uruguay, Germany, cannabis dispensation takes place in cannabis social clubs, legally not considered as a retail shop but as non-profit cooperatives. Finally, there are other types of cannabis shops like Bhang shops in India and experimental cannabis dispensation systems in Switzerland.

Cannabis shops differ from head shops in that the latter sells only drug paraphernalia. The world's largest cannabis dispensary is in Las Vegas, Nevada, at 112,000 square feet opened by Planet 13 Holdings.

== Types of cannabis retail outlets ==
=== Coffeeshop ===
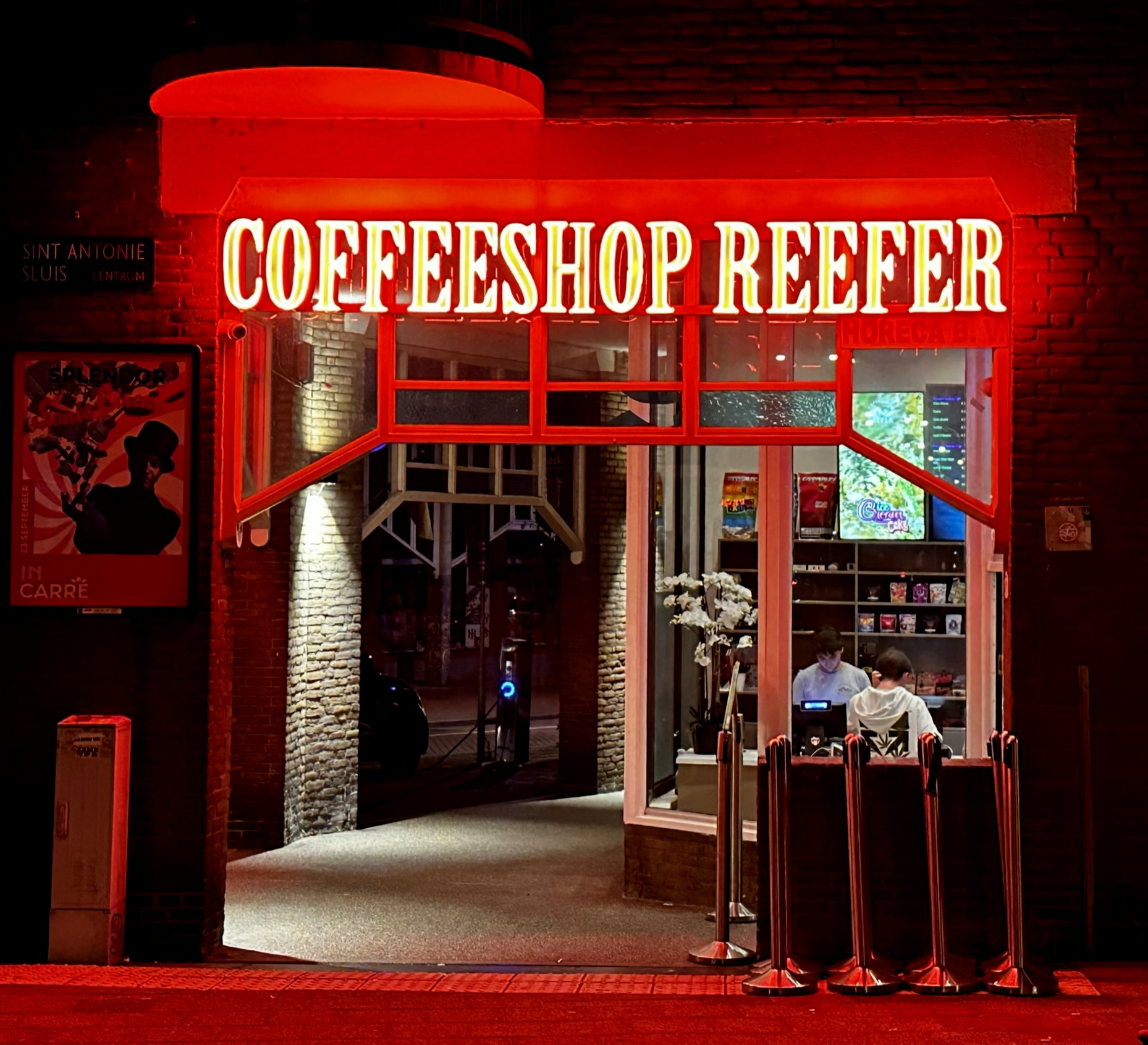
Coffeeshop in Amsterdam, Netherlands

Cannabis selling coffeeshops began in the 1970s. Establishments like Mellow Yellow coffeeshop were known for open cannabis smoking and dealing. After an explosion of hard drugs authorities began to tolerate soft drugs and legalized cannabis selling in registered coffeeshops. Similarly, cannabis cafés and bars are well established in Thailand.

=== Dispensary ===
==== United States ====
In certain territories of the United States, dispensaries distribute cannabis to the general public or in some cases only to approved patients. In Uruguay cannabis dispensaries are built by the government and can sell to the public.

In 2015, the City of San Diego made A Green Alternative the first licensed medical cannabis dispensary and delivery service in the city.

==== Canada ====
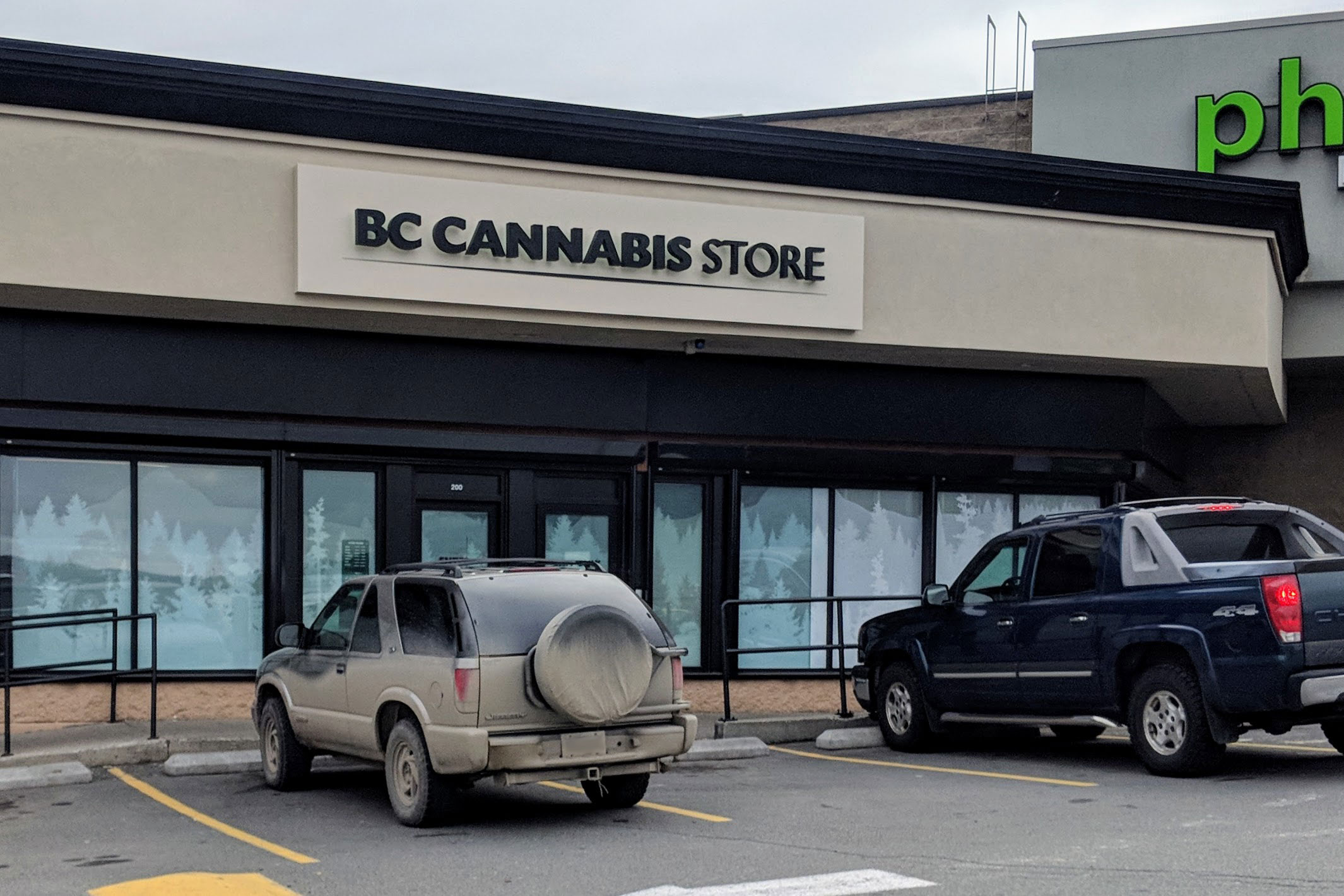
Government-owned cannabis dispensary operated by BC Cannabis Stores in British Columbia, Canada

In Canada, dispensaries are also popularly known as cannabis stores. Following the national legalization of recreational cannabis under the 2018 federal Cannabis Act, laws around the licensing and operation of cannabis stores are left to the provincial and territorial governments. Some provinces and territories, such as Manitoba and Saskatchewan, have a fully privatized physical and online cannabis retail market. Others maintain a hybrid system with fully privatized physical retail but government-owned online retail (such as in Ontario or Newfoundland and Labrador), or a mixture of private- and government-owned cannabis stores (such as in British Columbia). Government-owned cannabis stores are typically operated through existing provincial/territorial government alcohol monopolies (such as the Nova Scotia Liquor Corporation) or by establishing new Crown corporations to operate cannabis stores (such as the Société québécoise du cannabis or Cannabis NB).

=== Delivery service ===
Designated similarly to a dispensary, cannabis delivery services do not operate a walk-in storefront. In California the rise of delivery services has been steadily occurring. Cannabis delivery services are subject to the same regulations as walk in dispensaries with the added stipulation that they can only deliver directly to the consumers home address. Delivery to public business and other areas is expressly forbidden by California Cannabis Delivery Laws

In Ontario, the government-owned Ontario Cannabis Retail Corporation retains the legal monopoly on online delivery for recreational cannabis.

=== Cannabis social club ===
A Cannabis social club (CSC) is a non-profit members-only industry model for non-medical cannabis. CSCs do not "sell" cannabis as such: legally, they only grow the amount needed for their members in exchange for the costs of production (a form of delegation of home cultivation to the club). The exchange of the product against money is not considered a sale, but a sharing of the costs of production, and therefore can be considered a personal activity, happening in collective private settings.

CSCs exist without specific regulation, taking advantage of legal precedents, in New Zealand, Spain, Belgium, France, the Netherlands, Slovenia, and Austria. They are regulated by law in Uruguay (since 2014), Malta (since 2021), and Germany (since 2024).

=== Bhang shop ===
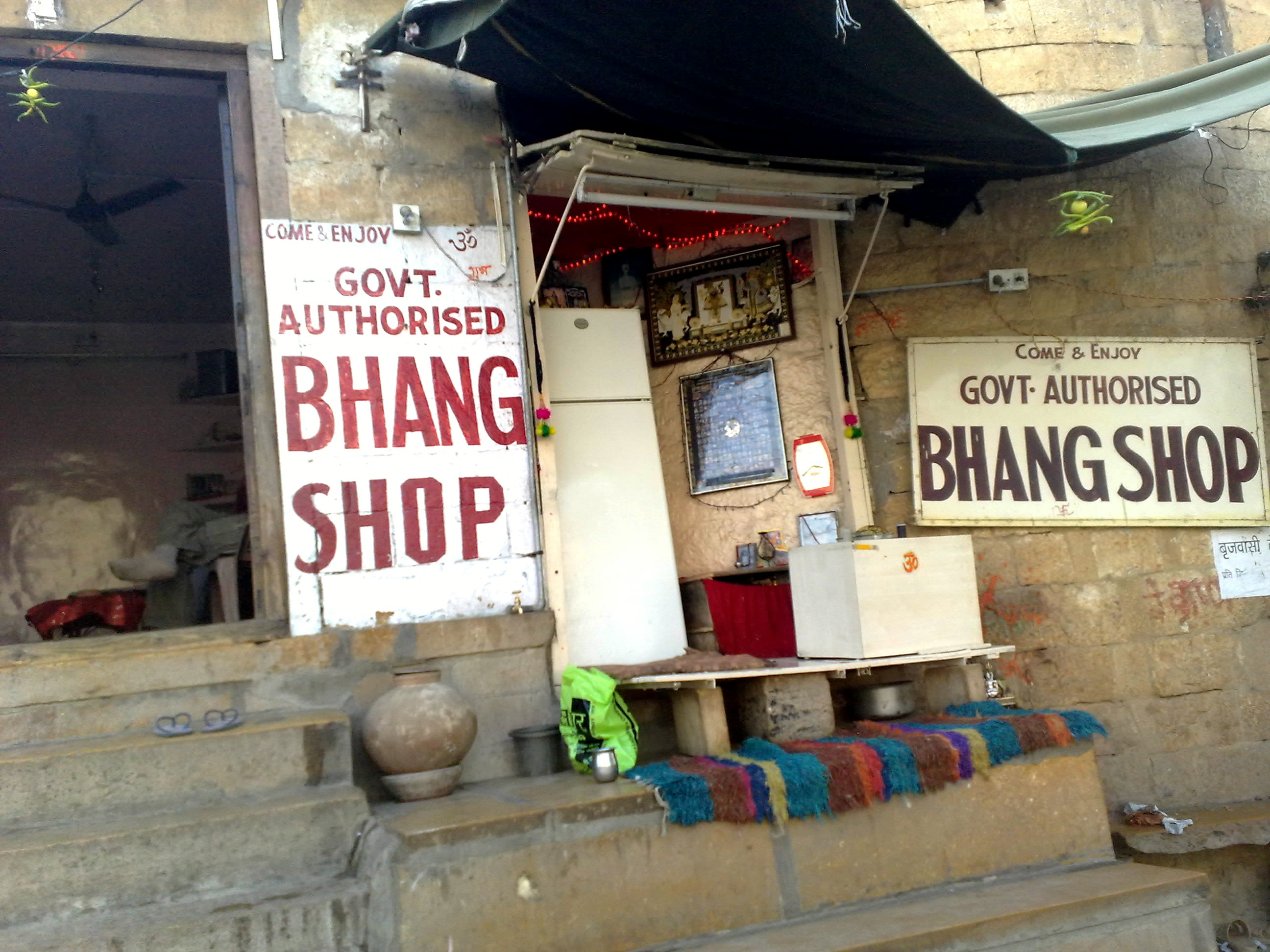
A bhang shop in Jaisalmer, Rajasthan, India

In India, several Indian states allow licensed bhang shops to sell bhang, a decoction of cannabis. They mainly sell traditional cannabis-infused Indian bhang drinks Bhang lassi and Bhang thandai.

=== Experimentations ===
In Switzerland, the first pilot project of recreational adult use dispensation, half-way between a dispensary and a cannabis club, started on 31 January 2023.

The Netherlands is also experimenting a legal dispensary system, in parallel of its coffeeshop model. The pilot project started in December 2023.

== Gallery ==
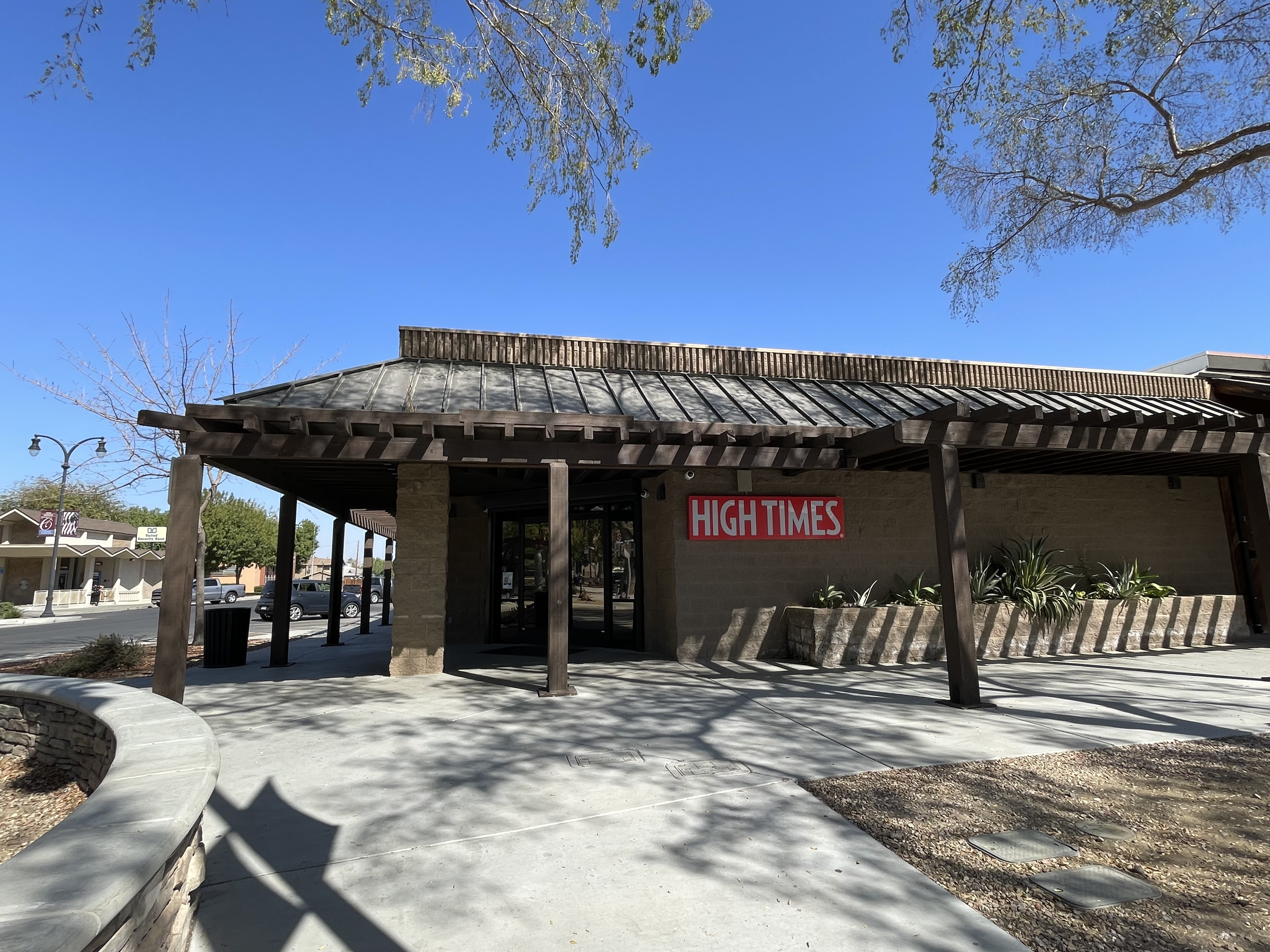

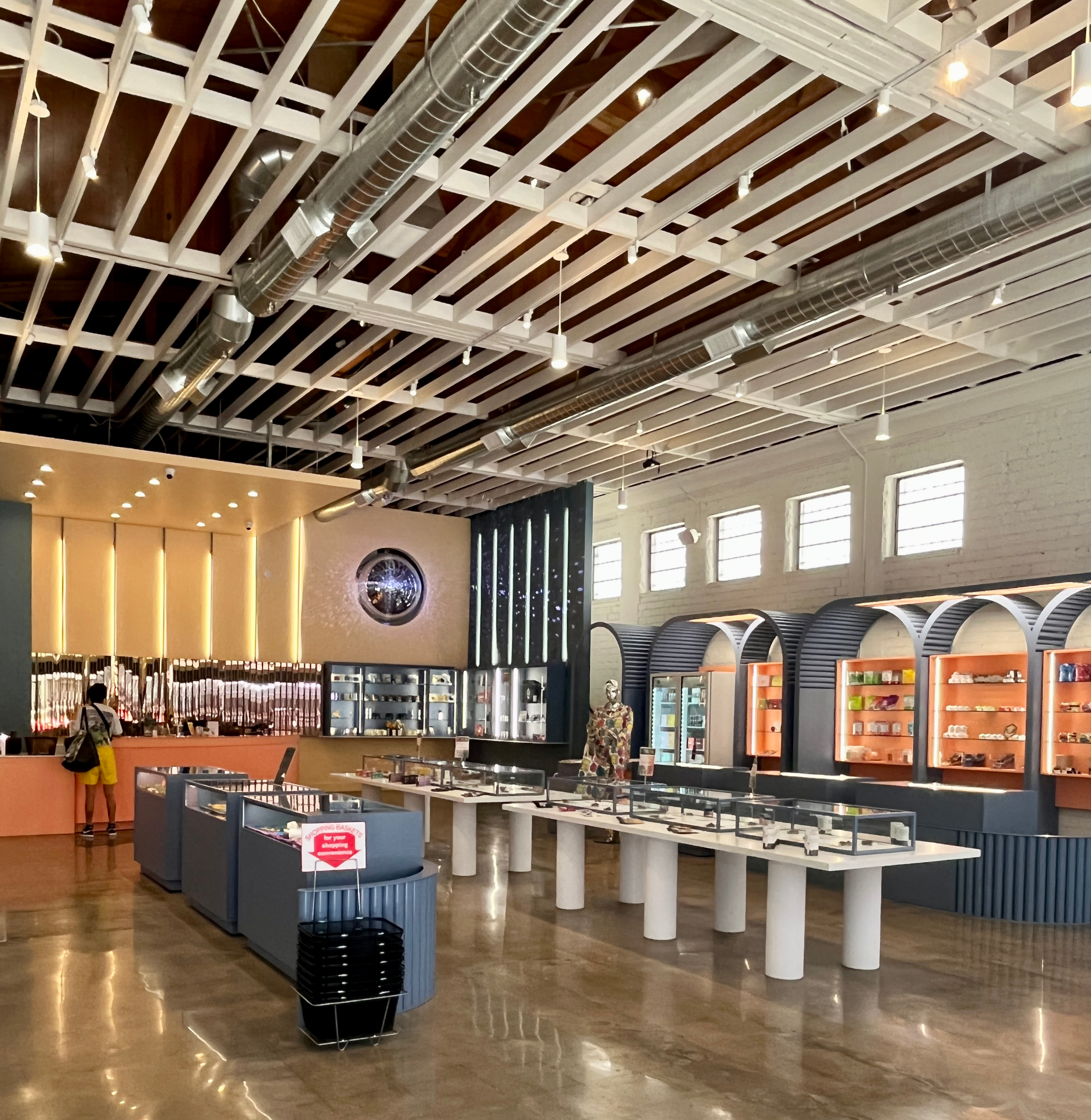

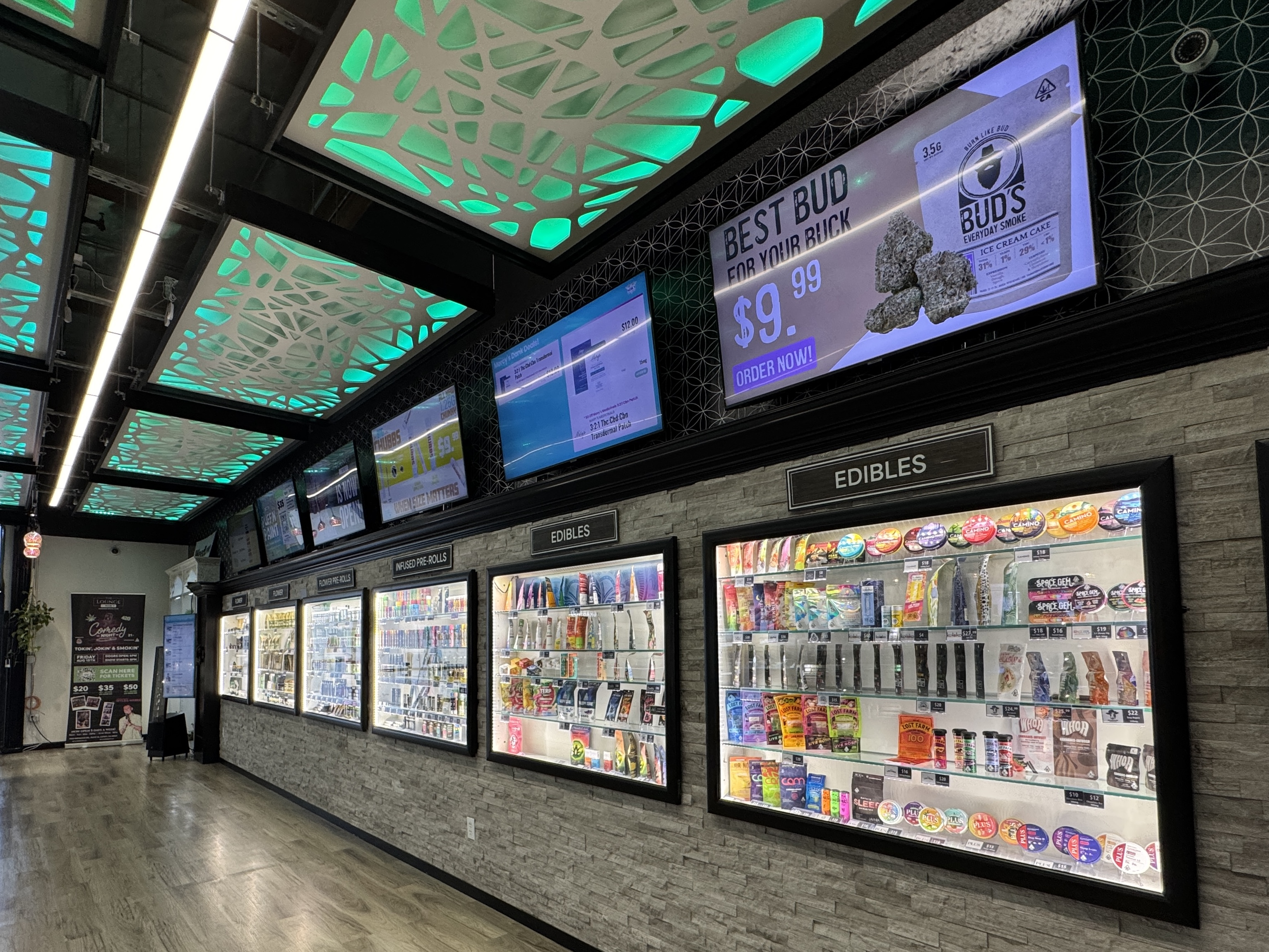

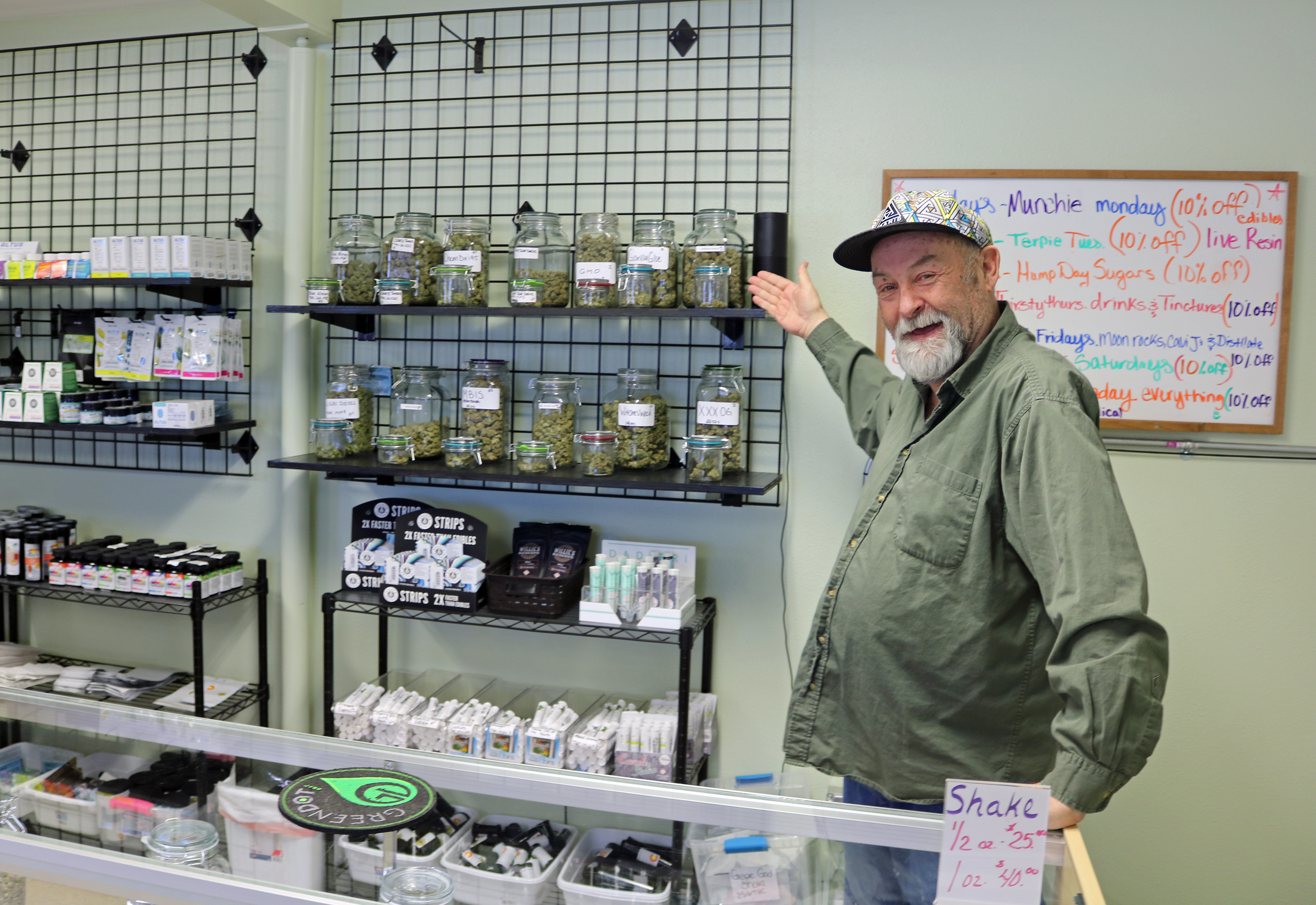

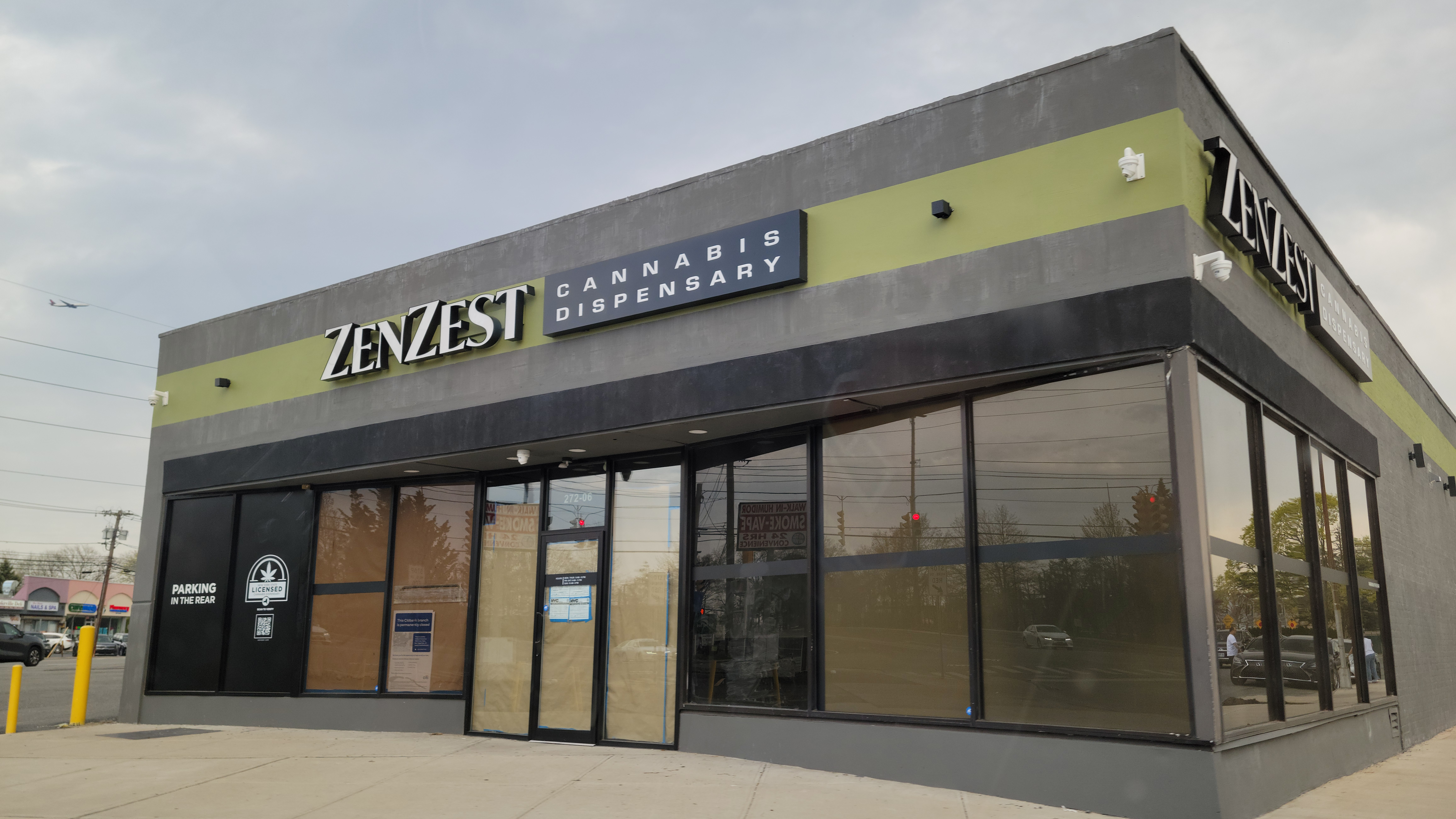

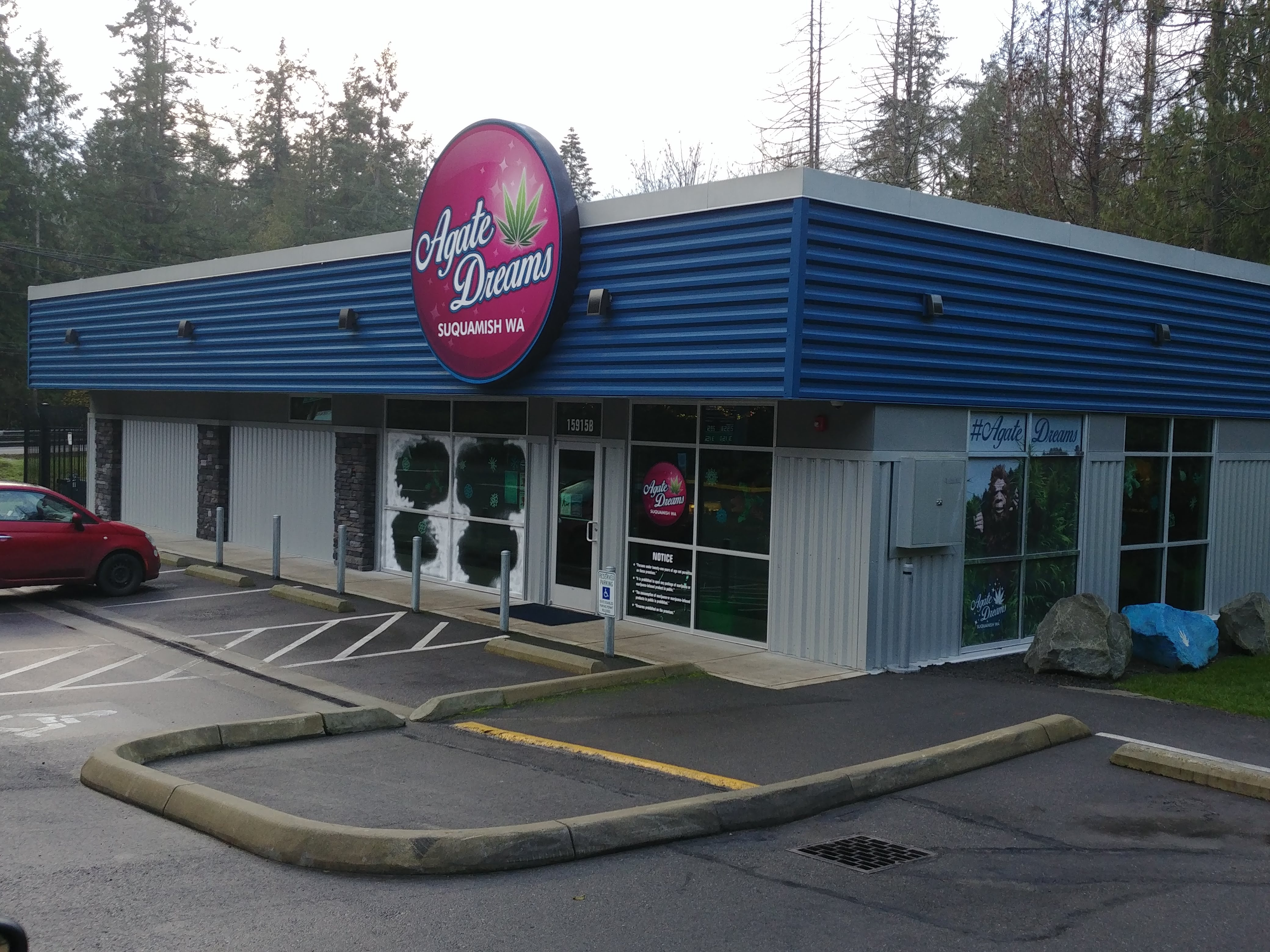

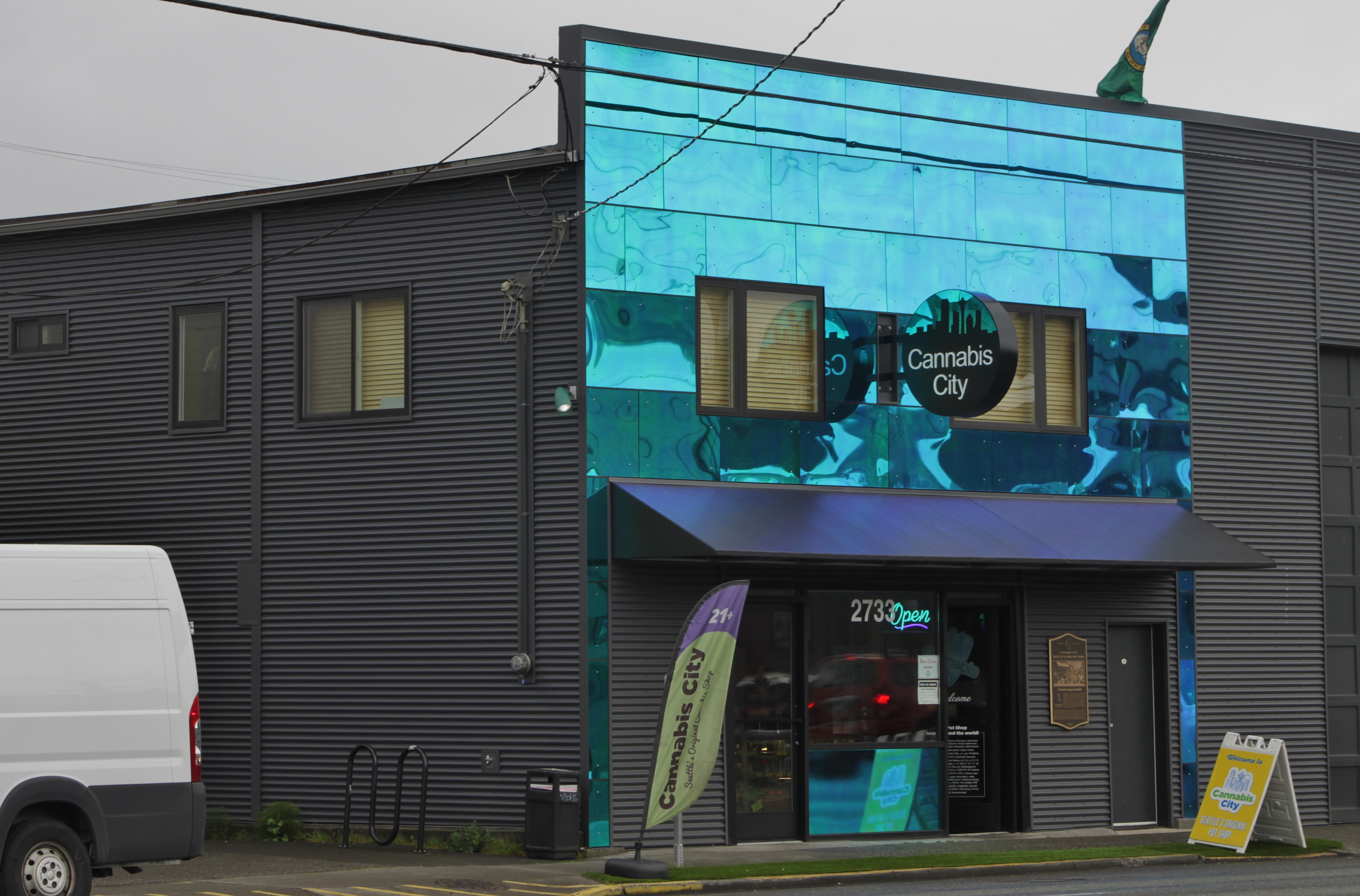

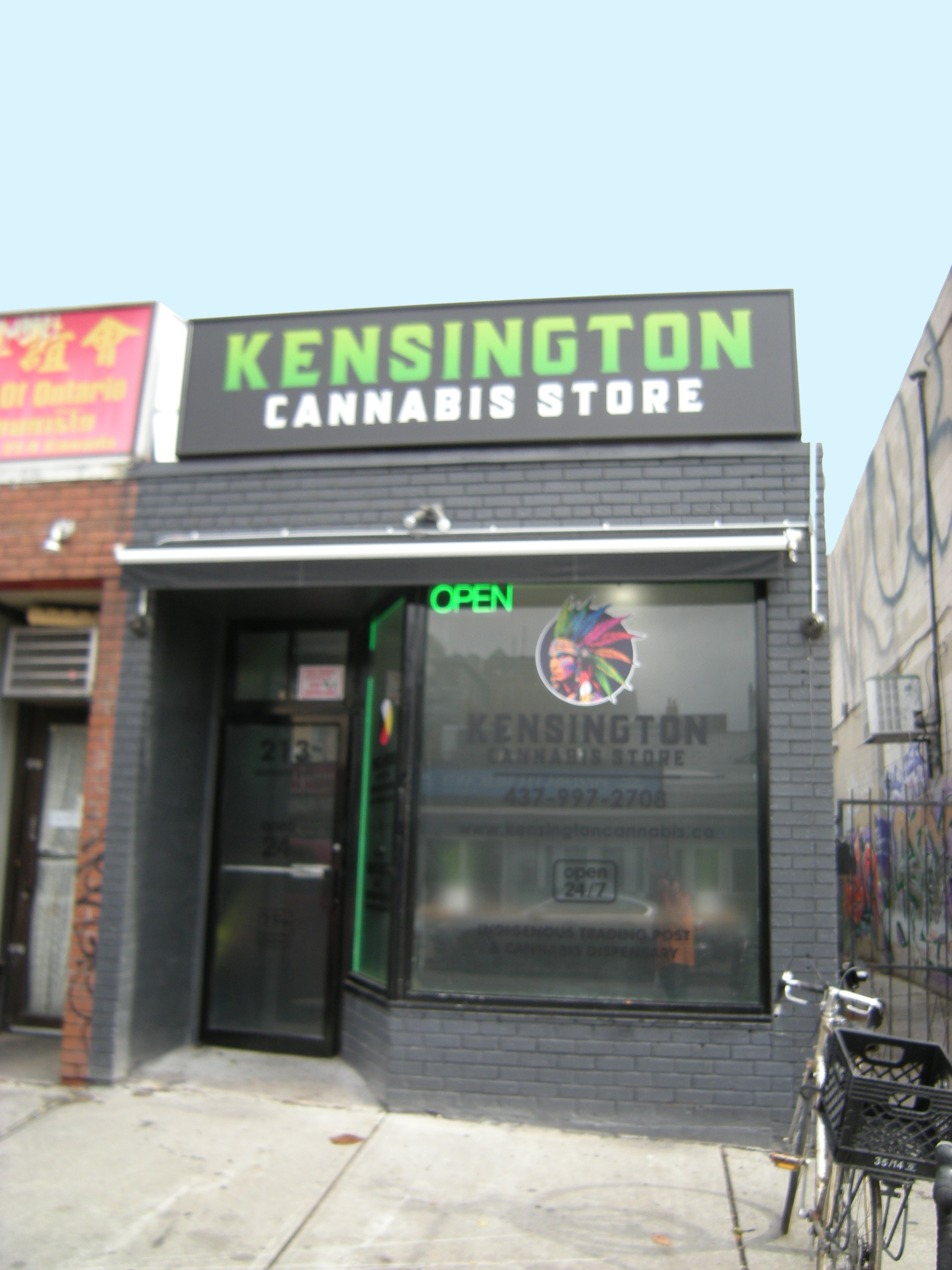

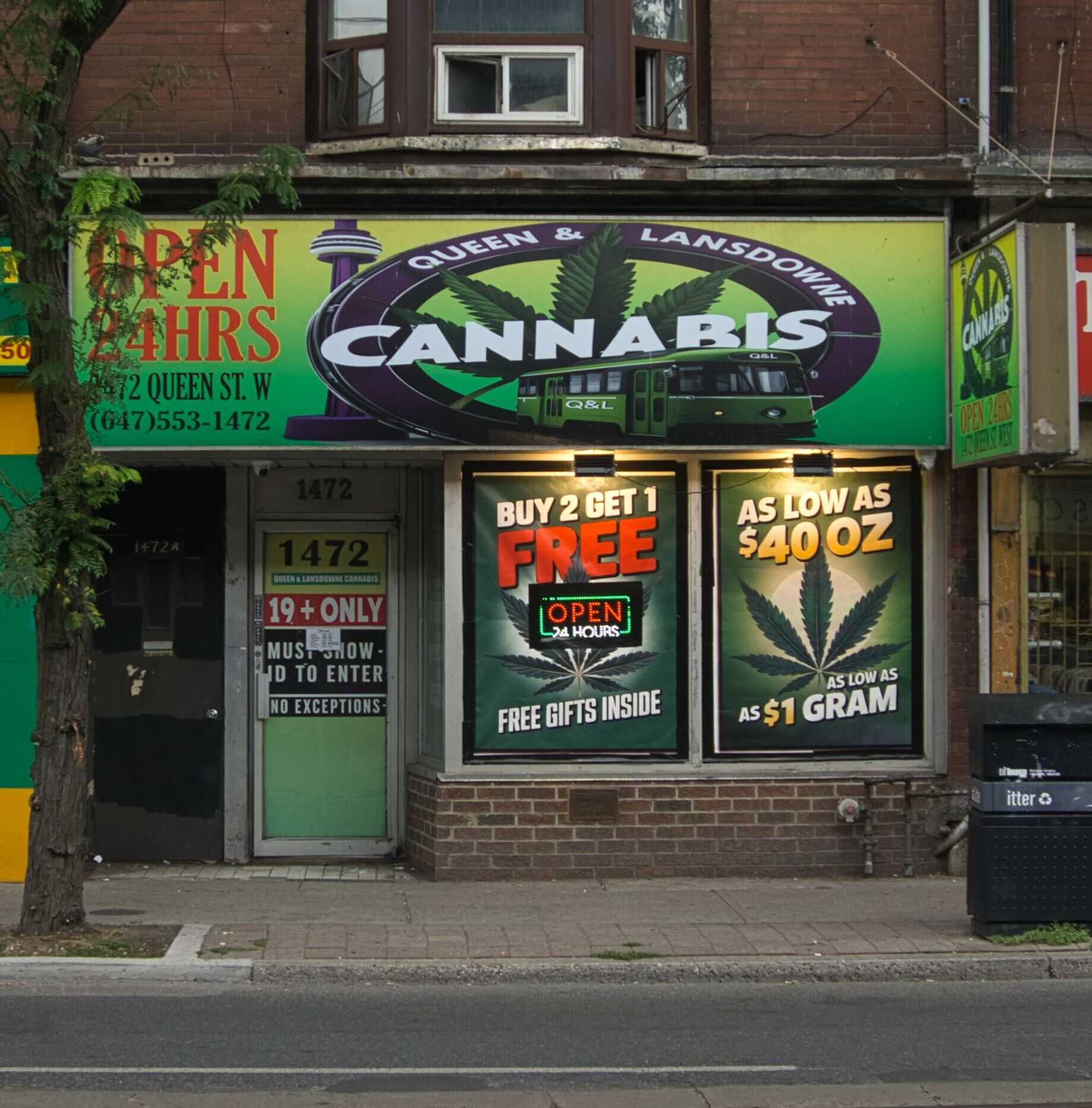

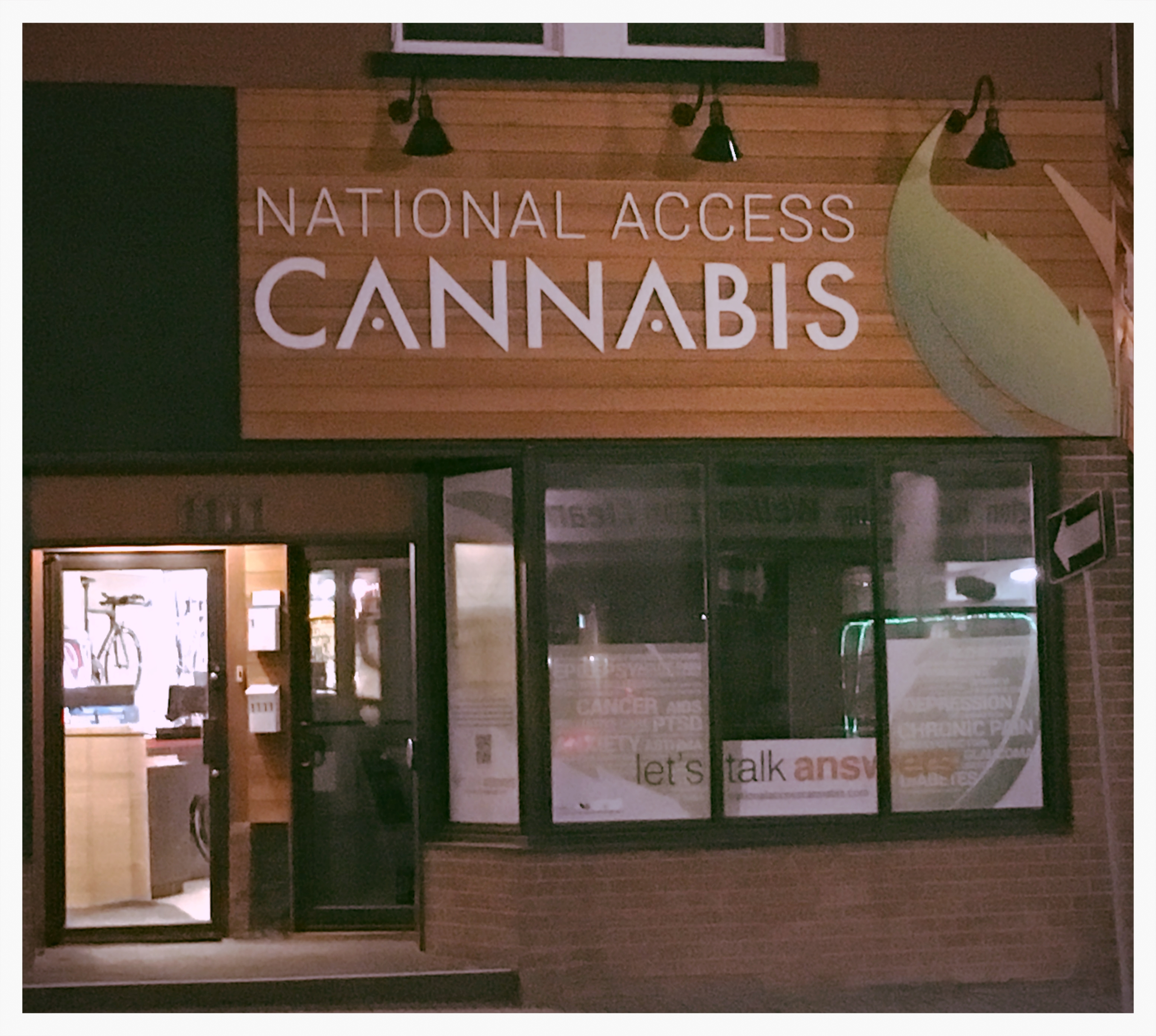

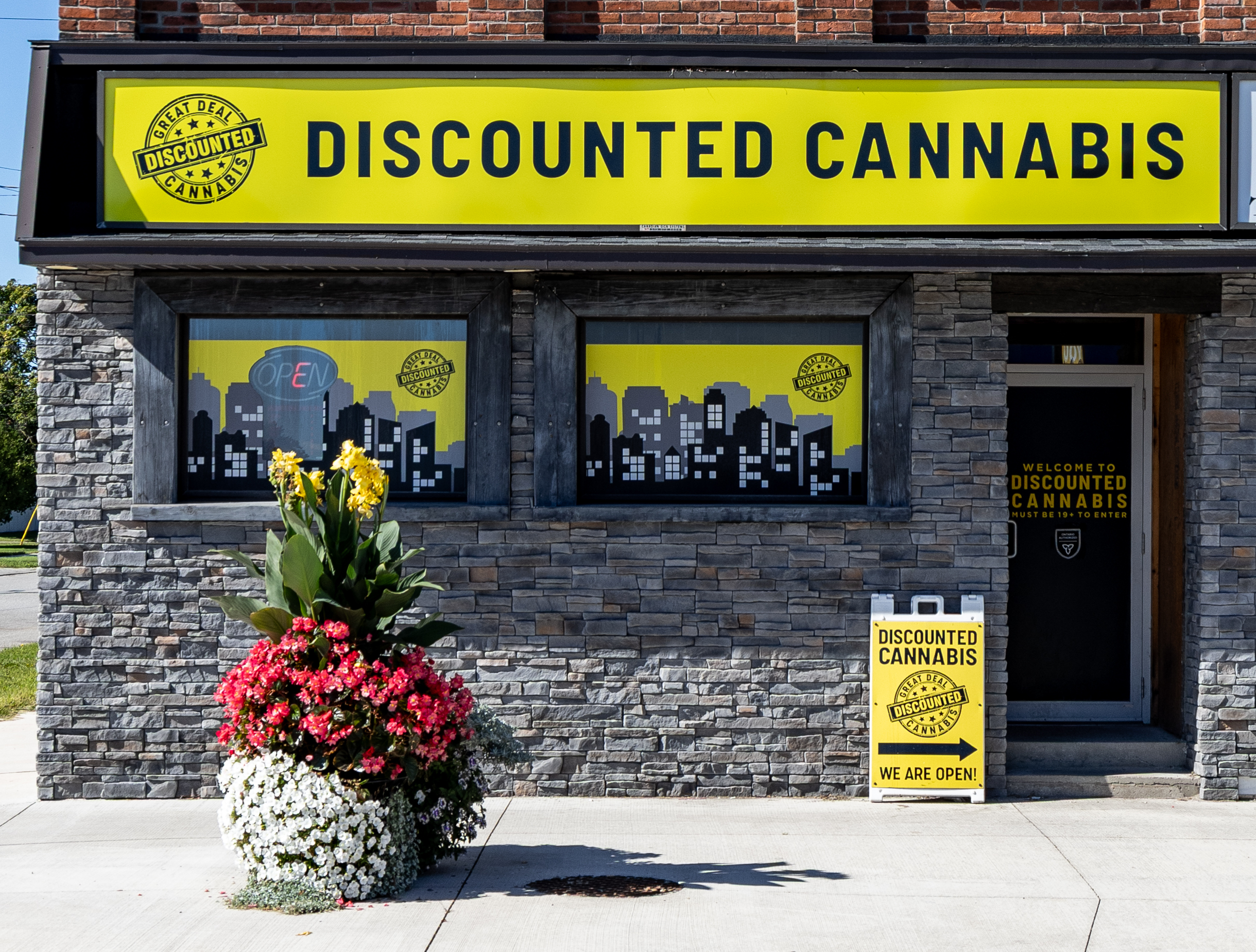

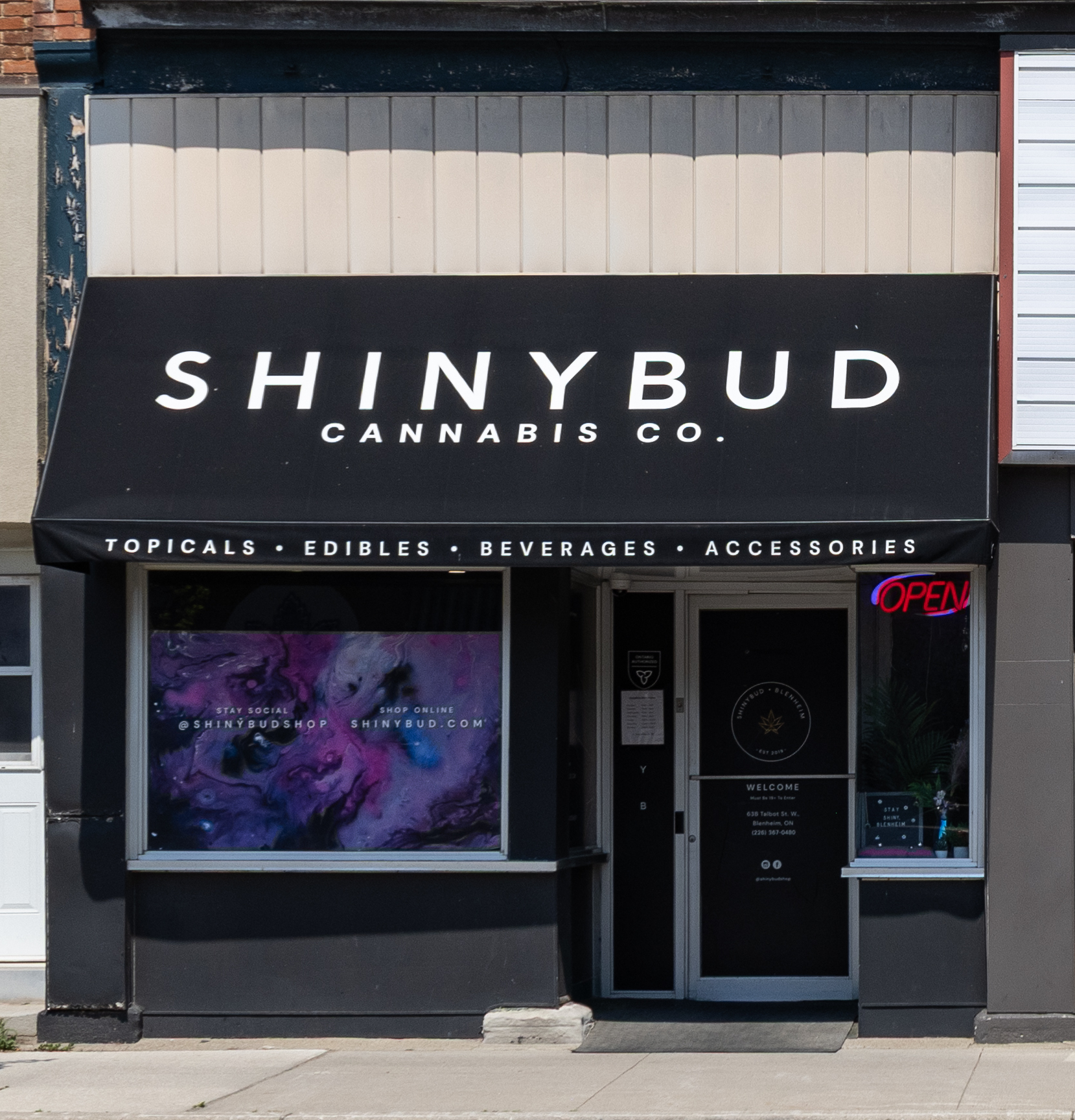

== See also ==
- Online illicit drug vendor
- Psychedelic mushroom store
