= South Park and Philosophy =

South Park and Philosophy may be one of three books:

- South Park and Philosophy: Bigger, Longer, and More Penetrating, by Richard Hanley, 2007
- South Park and Philosophy: You Know, I Learned Something Today, by Robert Arp, 2006
- (The Ultimate) South Park and Philosophy: Respect My Philosophah!, by Robert Arp, 2013
