= Trapped in the Closet (South Park) =

- South Park episode
- Xenu as depicted in South Park, with a line onscreen mocking Scientology
- Episode no.: Season 9 Episode 12
- Directed by: Trey Parker (credited as John Smith)
- Written by: Trey Parker (credited as John Smith)
- Production code: 912
- Original air date: November 16, 2005

Episode chronology
← Previous "Ginger Kids"	Next → "Free Willzyx"
- South Park season 9

"Trapped in the Closet" is the twelfth episode in the ninth season of the American animated television series South Park. The 137th episode of the series overall, it originally aired on Comedy Central in the United States on November 16, 2005. In the episode, Stan joins Scientology in an attempt to find something "fun and free". After the discovery of his surprisingly high "thetan levels", he is recognized as the reincarnation of L. Ron Hubbard, the founder of the church. The episode was written and directed by series co-creator Trey Parker, who was credited as John Smith.

"Trapped in the Closet" generated significant controversy when a rebroadcast scheduled for March 15, 2006, was replaced by the episode "Chef's Chocolate Salty Balls". Comedy Central stated the change was a tribute to Isaac Hayes after Hayes announced his departure from the show, but other reports claimed Tom Cruise, who is portrayed in the episode, threatened to back out of his promotional obligations for the Paramount Pictures film Mission: Impossible III if Viacom, the owner of both Comedy Central and Paramount, allowed a repeat airing of the episode. Cruise and his representative denied the claims. A statement from Hayes, also a Scientologist, said he left the show in response to the episode, though Hayes's son later said the statement was written without the knowledge of his father, who had not recovered from a stroke. The episode has since been rebroadcast on Comedy Central regularly.

"Trapped in the Closet" was nominated for an Emmy Award in July 2006, in the Primetime Emmy Award for Outstanding Animated Program (for Programming Less Than One Hour) category. The episode was also featured among Comedy Central's list of "10 South Parks That Changed The World". TV Guide ranked the episode #17 on its list of "TV's Top 100 Episodes of All Time".

== Plot ==
Stan takes a free "personality test" offered by Scientologists on the street. After answering the questionnaire, Stan is informed that he is extremely depressed and therefore a perfect candidate for Scientology. They offer to help him for $240. Stan returns later and pays the Scientologists using money he had been saving for a bicycle. He is taken into an auditing room where an attendant reads his thetan levels using an E-meter. Stan has such a high reading that the Scientology headquarters is notified. There, the president of Scientology determines that Stan is a reincarnation of L. Ron Hubbard, Scientology's founder and prophet.

Later that night, a group of Scientologists gather outside the Marsh house to celebrate Hubbard's "second coming". The president of Scientology arrives and talks with Stan's parents, who oppose Stan's participation. Randy sends Stan to his room, where he finds Tom Cruise waiting. When Stan comments that Cruise's acting is okay but not as good as others', Cruise despairs and locks himself in Stan's closet. He refuses to come out despite numerous requests to "come out of the closet"; several other celebrities, including Nicole Kidman, John Travolta, and R. Kelly, attempt to coax Cruise out of hiding, but to no avail; Travolta eventually joins Cruise in the closet, and subsequently so does Kelly.

Downstairs, the church president tries to convince Stan's parents to allow their son to participate. He privately tells Stan the story of Xenu, according to the Scientology Operating Thetan III document. During this, an onscreen caption reads "This is what scientologists actually believe". He then begs Stan to write new teachings as Hubbard. Stan is impressed by the story and shows his writings to the president who initially approves of the work. When Stan suggests that Scientology should stop charging people for their services, the president admits to Stan that the church is in reality a global money-making scam. He asks that Stan continue with that in mind; Stan appears to agree and keeps writing.

The president introduces Stan to his followers. However, instead of presenting a new doctrine to them, Stan explains that he is not the reincarnation of Hubbard and that Scientology is a scam. The outraged Scientologists and the celebrities who leave the closet vow to sue Stan. The episode ends with Stan looking directly at the camera and demanding that they sue him. The closing credits name only "John Smith" and "Jane Smith", in reference to Cruise and the Church of Scientology's reputation for litigiousness.

== Production ==
South Park had previously parodied Scientology in a spoof at the 2000 MTV Movie Awards. The MTV short was titled "The Gauntlet" and included "John Travolta and the Church of Scientology" arriving in a spaceship to defeat Russell Crowe (as a gladiator) and attempt to recruit the boys into Scientology. Travolta, along with his fellow Scientologists, was depicted as a Psychlo, as he appeared in the film Battlefield Earth. They had also made fun of Scientology in an earlier episode, titled "Super Best Friends", in which David Blaine formed his own cult, called "Blaintology". Parker and Stone have acknowledged that this is meant to be a reference to Scientology.

Parker stated that Isaac Hayes' membership had previously kept the show's creators from writing a full episode which parodies Scientology. However, the decision to ultimately produce a South Park episode satirizing Scientology was partially inspired by the friendship the show's creators have with Penn Jillette. Jillette was originally planning to do an episode of Bullshit! based on Scientology, but Showtime prohibited him from doing so to avoid the possibility of legal action from the Church of Scientology. Parker commented, "We're going, That's fucked up. And hearing other people say, 'You can't do that' – you can only say 'You can't do that' so many times to Matt and me before we're gonna do it. Finally, we just had to tell Isaac, 'Dude, we totally love working with you, and this is nothing personal, it's just we're South Park, and if we don't do this, we're belittling everything else we've ripped on.'"

Although some questions were raised prior to the episode's screening about whether it was wise to take swipes at Cruise and Scientology, Comedy Central declared that it supported Stone and Parker. A Comedy Central spokesman told Radar magazine in November 2005 that "they are free, and have been, to satirize anybody and anything they want to. They've made fun of MTV, they've made fun of Viacom, they've made fun of Comedy Central, and we've never interfered with them."

During production on the episode, investigative journalist Mark Ebner served as a consultant to Stone and Parker. Ebner had previously authored Hollywood, Interrupted, a New York Times best seller which includes an analysis of the Church of Scientology and its effects on the culture in Hollywood, and has a chapter on Cruise and Travolta's relationship to Scientology. On the official Comedy Central website for the South Park episode, it is asserted that the section of "Trapped in the Closet" that explains Scientology's portrayal and beliefs was not exaggerated: "Nothing about what you see here is exaggerated in the slightest. Seriously." The title is a reference to the R. Kelly song and music video series of the same name, and a depiction of R. Kelly appears in the episode to sing a parody of it.

== Controversy ==
=== Isaac Hayes' departure ===
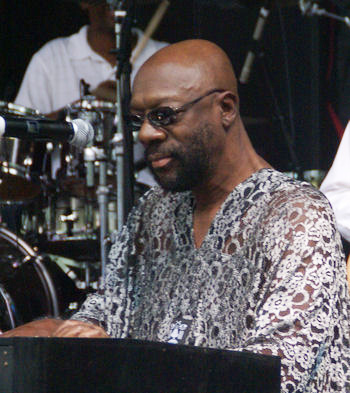
Isaac Hayes was the voice of Chef on South Park.

On March 13, 2006, a statement credited to Hayes, a Scientologist himself, announced that he was quitting the show because of the series' treatment of religion, saying, "There is a place in this world for satire, but there is a time when satire ends and intolerance and bigotry towards religious beliefs of others begins. Religious beliefs are sacred to people, and at all times should be respected and honored. As a civil rights activist of the past 40 years, I cannot support a show that disrespects those beliefs and practices." The Guardian observed that the show had mocked most other religions, but that he drew the line at Scientology. Later in an interview on CNN's Showbiz Tonight, Hayes added he did not see the episode itself, but was told about it. In a separate interview, he reportedly said regarding Trey Parker and Matt Stone, "Guys, you have it all wrong. We're not like that. I know that's your thing, but get your information correct, because somebody might believe that shit, you know? But I understand what they're doing. I told them to take a couple of Scientology courses, and understand what we do."

Responding to Hayes' departure, Stone asserted that "This is 100 percent having to do with his faith of Scientology... He has no problem—and he's cashed plenty of checks—with our show making fun of Christians." According to Stone, neither he nor Parker had "heard a peep out of Isaac in any way until we did Scientology. He wants a different standard for religions other than his own, and to me, that is where intolerance and bigotry begin." Stone commented that "In 10 years and over 150 episodes of South Park, Isaac never had a problem with the show making fun of Christians, Muslims, Mormons and Jews. He got a sudden case of religious sensitivity when it was his religion featured on the show. To bring the civil rights struggle into this is just a non sequitur. Of course we will release Isaac from his contract and we wish him well." According to a later commentary by Stone, prior to the episode's screening Hayes had asked the South Park creators to have Comedy Central pull the episode before it aired and not include it in the series DVD, which they refused.

There were several different stories about Hayes' departure. Ten months after Hayes' departure he said, "They didn't pay me enough", and "They weren't that nice". In late 2007, a journalist reported that Hayes was in no condition to stay, because of a stroke he suffered in January. According to a Fox News article, Hayes' agent Christina Kimball, herself a practicing Scientologist, was the source of the statements that Hayes quit South Park. Stone lent support to this view in a 2007 interview with Rolling Stone, commenting that "There are reports that Isaac had a stroke and Scientology quit the show for him, and I believe it... It was a brutal, up-close, personal thing with Isaac. If you look at the timeline, something doesn't add up." In a 2016 interview with The Hollywood Reporter alongside Stone and Parker, Hayes's son Isaac Hayes III confirmed that his father was disabled at the time of his resignation and that the decision must have come from one of his assistants, all of whom were Scientologists. Due to the absence of Hayes, Chef was voiced in "The Return of Chef" using pre-recorded snippets of dialog from previous episodes. The character was written out of the series by a scene near the end of that episode in which he is struck by lightning, burned, impaled, and mauled to death by a mountain lion and a grizzly bear, before being resurrected as a Darth Vader-type being by that episode's villains.

=== Tom Cruise parody ===
The creators used the ambiguity of "coming out of the closet", having Tom Cruise literally refusing to come out of Stan's closet, in a parody of rumors that Cruise was homosexual. Cruise has a documented history of litigation against others involving rumors as to his sexuality, and some speculated whether Cruise could sue South Park. Entertainment Weekly asked in December 2005 whether South Park was "cruisin' for a bruisin'" and wondered "how that sort of Cruise-bashing is going to go over with Park creators Trey Parker and Matt Stone's new bosses: Paramount Pictures just inked the dudes to a three-year deal. Other people with Paramount deals? Oh, just, you know, Tom Cruise. Should be one hell of a studio Christmas party".

Concerns over possible litigation were raised in other countries where South Park is syndicated. The episode's planned screening on the UK's Paramount Comedy 1 channel was canceled for fear that Cruise would sue. In Australia, SBS TV screened the episode in late February, with a spokesman telling Australian The Daily Telegraph that "We haven't received any legal threats so we're going to publish and be damned."

=== Closetgate ===
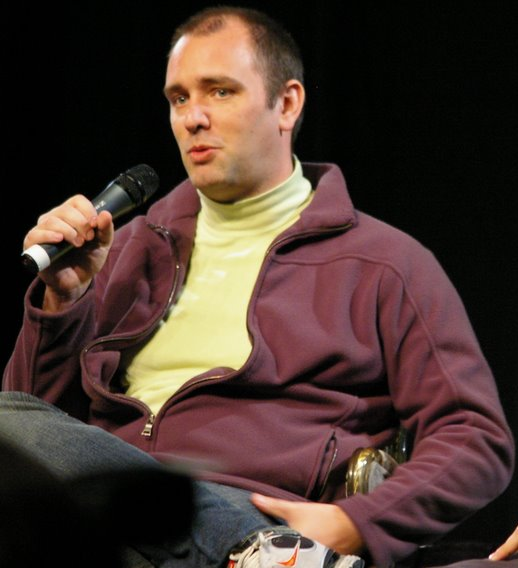
Trey Parker, one of the co-creators of South Park

This episode was scheduled to rebroadcast on March 15, 2006, on Comedy Central, but the broadcast was canceled without prior notice, and was replaced with "Chef's Chocolate Salty Balls". Representatives of Comedy Central insist that the episode was changed as a tribute to Isaac Hayes following his departure from the show two days earlier. The following day, the Hollywoodinterrupted.com blog alleged that Comedy Central parent Viacom canceled the rebroadcast due to threats of Cruise to boycott the publicity tour of his upcoming film Mission: Impossible III. These assertions were soon also reported by E! News and American Morning. Fox News attributed threats from Tom Cruise, stating, "to back out of his Mission: Impossible III promotional duties if Viacom didn't pull a repeat of the episode", as evidence of "bad blood" between Cruise and Viacom (which also owns Paramount Pictures, the distributor of MI:III). CNN's The Situation Room with Wolf Blitzer also cited "industry sources" who believed the episode was pulled "because the network and Tom Cruise's current movie studio are both owned by the same corporation."

The Washington Post reported that South Park fans "struck back", in March 2006, and threatened to boycott Mission: Impossible III until Comedy Central put "Trapped in the Closet" back on its schedule. Melissa McNamara of CBS News later questioned whether this boycott hurt the Mission: Impossible III box office debut. The South Park creators did not comment directly on Comedy Central's decision to pull the episode, reportedly because they had been told not to discuss the matter to avoid embarrassing Cruise. Instead, they issued a statement through their lawyer on March 17, 2006, signing the statement, "Trey Parker and Matt Stone, servants of the dark lord Xenu".

The Los Angeles Times dubbed the controversy surrounding the episode's rebroadcast "Closetgate". The Independent later cited the Los Angeles Times, noting that the controversy generated positive publicity for the show's creators: "For Stone and Parker, Closetgate will be the gift that keeps on giving." "Closetgate" has since been used to refer to the "brouhaha" surrounding Isaac Hayes' departure and rebroadcasts of the episode, by other sources including Yahoo! Movies, BBC, Turner Classic Movies, the Herald-Sun, Thoralf Fagertun of the University of Tromsø, and the Chicago Sun-Times.

Cruise's representative responded to the controversy shortly after it broke, telling the Associated Press that the allegations of Cruise's involvement were "not true" and that "he never said that". According to The Washington Post, Cruise's publicist asserted that "Tom had nothing to do with this matter. He's been promoting 'Mission: Impossible III' for the last six months. We have no clue where this came from." Cruise himself addressed the allegations in an interview on ABC's Primetime in mid-April. When asked about whether he had been involved with stopping the rebroadcast on Comedy Central, Cruise stated, "First of all, could you ever imagine sitting down with anyone? I would never sit down with someone and question them on their beliefs. Here's the thing: I'm really not even going to dignify this. I honestly didn't really even know about it. I'm working, making my movie, I've got my family. I'm busy. I don't spend my days going, 'What are people saying about me?'"

In April 2006, TelevisionWeek reported that fans had posted the episode in multiple locations on the internet. At that time, the episode had been viewed over 700,000 times on YouTube, and an online petition to re-air the episode had garnered 5,000 signatures. TelevisionWeek noted that Comedy Central "looked the other way at the online proliferation" of "Trapped in the Closet". A spokesman for MTV Networks, owner of Comedy Central, confirmed they had not asked YouTube to pull the episode from their site. The Situation Room also noted that clips from the episode were still available on Comedy Central's web site. In May 2006, "Trapped in the Closet" was shown in London, at the National Film Theatre. The free screening was followed by a discussion with Parker and Stone, who said the screening was a "display of free speech". Free copies of the episode were given out to attendees after the screening.

"C'mon Jews, show them who really runs Hollywood" – Comedy Central advertisement, Variety, August 1, 2006

On July 19, 2006, Comedy Central did air a rebroadcast of the episode at 10:00 pm Pacific Time and did so again on July 23 at 11:00 pm Eastern Time and on September 24 at 10:00 pm Eastern time. Stone stated "If they hadn't put this episode back on the air, we'd have had serious issues, and we wouldn't be doing anything else with them." After the episode was scheduled to be rebroadcast, Parker and Stone were interviewed on CNN's Showbiz Tonight, where they stated that all of the controversy increased publicity for the episode. Parker was quoted: "But it's really like a publicist couldn't have orchestrated this any better for us. You know what I mean? It's like it's been phenomenal. Tom Cruise has done more for South Park than anyone I think in the world."

The episode was released in several DVDs, including South Park the Hits: Volume 1 and South Park: The Complete Ninth Season, in contradiction with an alleged request by either the Church of Scientology or Cruise to never put the episode on DVD format. The full episode is also available for viewing on the web site of South Park Digital Studios, along with Parker and Stone's "mini-commentary" on it.

A few references have been made by the show and Comedy Central to Scientology as an aftermath of the controversy. On August 1, 2006, Comedy Central placed an advertisement in Variety showing the South Park stars against a background of L. Ron Hubbard's Scientology Celebrity Center, with the headline, "C'mon Jews, show them who really runs Hollywood." Although often misunderstood by the public to parody the Mel Gibson DUI incident, the advertisement actually congratulates South Park on gaining an Emmy nomination for "Trapped in the Closet" and satirizes the cancellation of the episode's rebroadcast in March.

The Rolling Stone cover article "Still Sick, Still Wrong", celebrating the show's anniversary, also referred to the controversy. The article depicted Stone and Parker spray painting graffiti on the church's Los Angeles organization sign, adding "Is dum" to the Scientology logo and a "Hi Tom" message with an accompanying depiction of Cartman's head.

== Reception ==
In a review of South Park: The Complete Ninth Season, The Denver Post stated the jokes about Tom Cruise "work splendidly and reveal their depth on repeated viewings, much like the show in general." IGN stated that "Perhaps the largest weakness of this season is that the most notorious episodes Best Friends Forever and Trapped in the Closet just don't carry the eye-popping impact that they did when they were ripped from the headlines", giving the DVD a rating of 7.0. The San Francisco Chronicle wrote that Stone and Parker "probably hit their zenith when they made fun of Tom Cruise and Scientology". An article in The Times wrote that South Park "infamously satirized" texts by L. Ron Hubbard "available only to Operating Thetans". TV Guide ranked the episode #17 on its 2009 list of "TV's Top 100 Episodes of All Time".

=== Analysis ===
An article in the Journal of the American Academy of Religion referred to the episode as a "scathing cartoon parody" of the Church of Scientology. University of Delaware philosophy professor Richard Hanley analyzed the mythology of Scientology, as it relates to the episode "Trapped in the Closet", in his 2007 book South Park and Philosophy: Bigger, Longer, and More Penetrating. Hanley called the Xenu story as presented in the episode, "utterly ridiculous". Hanley went on to delve into a philosophical analysis of the "evidential weight" of popularity and tradition in determining the "robustness" of beliefs.

Southwest Minnesota State University philosophy professor Robert Arp also analyzed the philosophical and cultural aspects of the episode in his book South Park and Philosophy: You Know, I Learned Something Today. Arp analyzed Comedy Central's reaction to the episode itself, in a section of his book entitled "2005–2006: Comedy Central Caves". Arp mentions South Park's usage of the onscreen caption—"This is what Scientologists actually believe"—in the episode, noting that the same device was used in the episode "All About the Mormons?" In referencing this similar use of the onscreen caption device, Arp seemed to point to an inconsistency in the behavior of Comedy Central relative to the episode. He explained, "By a long shot, this show was more kind to Scientology than was 'All About the Mormons' to Mormonism." He noted Comedy Central had suggested it would not rebroadcast the episode for the second time, though it later announced on July 12, 2006, that it would.

=== Awards ===
The organization FACTNet, founded by Lawrence Wollersheim, named the South Park staff their "FACTNet Person(s) of the Year for 2005" for this episode. Robert Arp cited the series winning a Peabody Award due to its willingness to criticize intolerance in April 2006 as a "special concern for criticizing and countering intolerance", and the notion that "the Church of Scientology suffers from the widely held perceptions that it seeks to silence former members and others who criticize its beliefs and practices", as the motivation behind the episode.

Stone and Parker submitted the episode for an Emmy Award, though Stone admitted that "We did it to be jerks. A 'fuck you' to Comedy Central." To their surprise the episode was nominated on July 6, 2006, in the Primetime Emmy Award for Outstanding Animated Program (for Programming Less Than One Hour) category, the show's sixth nomination (one of which they won, for 2005's "Best Friends Forever"). The Simpsons episode "The Seemingly Never-Ending Story" was the eventual recipient of the award. It was also among Comedy Central's list of "10 South Parks That Changed The World", which started airing at September 24, 2006, in anticipation of the premiere of the second half of South Park's tenth season.

=== Legacy ===
The scene where Cruise enters the closet is referenced in the South Park segment of the opening of the 58th Primetime Emmy Awards on August 27, 2006, in which Conan O'Brien is trying to get to the show, but suddenly appears in Stan's room in an animated form. Stan begins yelling at him as he runs into the nearby closet. Immediately following the entrance, he exits the closet and says, "There's someone else in there", leaving the door open as he exits. Cruise then pops out and closes the door.

There is a scene in the film The Bridge by Brett Hanover, where two young women looking for a laugh tell a Scientology volunteer they learned about the organization from South Park. The volunteer answers that she has not seen the episode in question, and the two women later leave during the middle of an orientation video.

On February 8, 2013, while appearing on the Opie & Anthony Show, Jenna Miscavige Hill, the niece of the Chairman of Scientology, David Miscavige, admitted that she first learned about the story of Xenu from watching this episode.

== See also ==
- Scientology in popular culture
- South Park controversies
