= Bloody Mary (South Park) =

- South Park episode
- Episode no.: Season 9 Episode 14
- Directed by: Trey Parker
- Written by: Trey Parker
- Production code: 914
- Original air date: December 7, 2005

Episode chronology
| ← Previous "Free Willzyx" | Next → "The Return of Chef" |
- South Park season 9

"Bloody Mary" is the fourteenth and final episode of the ninth season of the American animated television series South Park. The 139th overall episode of the series, it originally aired on Comedy Central in the United States on December 7, 2005. In the episode, Randy loses his driver's license for driving under the influence and is ordered to attend Alcoholics Anonymous meetings, where he becomes convinced that alcoholism is a potentially fatal disease. Meanwhile, a statue of the Virgin Mary starts bleeding "out its ass" and Randy believes that he can be "cured" if it bleeds on him.

== Plot ==
Stan, Cartman, Kyle and Ike attend karate class while Stan's dad Randy goes for a couple of drinks. In the class, the instructor admonishes Cartman for his lack of discipline, and tells the class that true discipline comes from within.

After class, an inebriated Randy drives the boys home, but he is pulled over and arrested for drunk driving. Randy's driver's license is revoked, and he is ordered to perform community service and attend Alcoholics Anonymous, where he is introduced to the twelve-step program, which leads him to believe that he is powerless to control his drinking and that alcoholism is a disease. Randy, whom Stan describes as a "hypochondriac", then begins to drink more, since he has decided that he is in fact powerless to control it and cannot stop.

Meanwhile, outside a church in Bailey, a statue of the Virgin Mary starts to bleed "out its ass" and a cardinal sent by Vatican City declares it to be a miracle. So, people begin to flock around it to find a cure for their diseases. Randy believes it can cure his disease, too. He has Stan drive him to the church where the statue is, and after cutting in line, arguing that his "disease" is worse than that of others, he is drenched in the holy blood. He jumps up and declares that he will not drink any more, and abstains from alcohol for five days.

However, Pope Benedict XVI, who just obtained the position of the Catholic Church and is of even higher authority than cardinals, comes to investigate, and discovers that the blood is not actually coming from the statue's anus, but from its vagina. Since "chicks bleed out their vaginas all the time", he concludes that this is no miracle. Randy, disappointed, realizes that God did not "heal" him. At first, he again declares himself powerless, and most of the other recovering alcoholics agree and rush to the bar. But Stan follows Randy and convinces him that if God did not help him, then he must have managed to stop by himself.

Randy declares that he will never drink again. Stan objects, however, claiming that because Randy likes to drink, if he completely avoids drinking, then drinking is still controlling his life; he must therefore figure out how to live in moderation. Randy puts Stan on his shoulders and walks off into the sunset while the two discuss how much drinking would be proper.

== Production ==
Trey Parker and Matt Stone reveal on the DVD commentary for this episode that they had wanted to do an episode involving Alcoholics Anonymous meetings for "a long time", but could never get it right.

Parker and Stone joked that the bleeding statue idea came from Anne Garefino, a producer on the show who is Catholic, and was inspired by the real life phenomenon of "weeping statues", unusual occurrences where statues would unexplainably "bleed" some sort of liquid via supernatural means, usually from the eyes. The crew were discussing the idea of having this happen in an episode but felt it needed to be something more outlandish than the eyes. Parker and Stone also joked that Garefino then came up with the idea of having the statue "shit blood all over the pope's face".

The scene in which Randy gets arrested for drunk driving is based on a near identical experience that Parker had with his father when he was nine years-old.

== Controversy ==
The episode was aired on December 7, 2005, which is the eve of the Feast of the Immaculate Conception, a Catholic observance related specifically to the Virgin Mary. "Bloody Mary" was considered a very controversial episode, even by South Park standards.

=== In the United States ===
The Catholic League demanded an apology and that the episode "be permanently retired and not be made available on DVD" and that Joseph A. Califano, Jr., a board member of Viacom (the parent company of Comedy Central) and a practicing Catholic, issue a personal statement. Califano did later release a statement calling the episode an "appalling and disgusting portrayal of the Virgin Mary", and pledged to have it reviewed by Viacom's president and CEO, Tom Freston. Bishop William Skylstad, president of the United States Conference of Catholic Bishops, sent a letter to Freston saying the network showed "extreme insensitivity" when it aired the episode. When Comedy Central re-aired all episodes of Season 9 on December 28, 2005, "Bloody Mary" was absent from the broadcast. Comedy Central responded to e-mail inquiries about the fate of the episode with the assurance that "Bloody Mary" has not been retired and would not be pulled from the DVD release. Screen captures from the episode on Comedy Central's press site and the South Park section of comedycentral.com are absent.

On March 14, 2006, Rob Corddry, reporting on Comedy Central's own The Daily Show with Jon Stewart, said:

Christianity has evolved and matured. No longer do they stone people to death for blasphemy. Now they write a lot of letters to advertisers. Even a secular, atheistic, morally bankrupt entity like Comedy Central can be affected. Just ask Matt Stone and Trey Parker, creators of South Park, whose recent episode entitled "Bloody Mary" was pulled after a single airing. Now obviously [we at] Comedy Central can't show you that offensive material.

The South Park clips shown while Corddry spoke included several scenes of seemingly offensive material (fornicating cats, a man vomiting and then falling in his own vomit, Butters viewing a man being sodomized, etc.) but there was nothing from the "Bloody Mary" episode.

Like the "Trapped in the Closet" episode, "Bloody Mary" did return to the air, appearing on August 2, 2006.

=== In New Zealand ===
In February 2006, leaders from the New Zealand Catholic Bishops' Conference, the Council of Christians and Muslims, and other religious groups together lobbied media conglomerate CanWest to stop a planned airing of the episode in New Zealand on the music channel C4. The network rejected the plea and said the episode would air as planned. Leading Catholic bishops then called for a boycott of C4 and its sister network TV3. CanWest again resisted and aired the episode sooner than planned to take advantage of the media attention. New Zealand's Prime Minister Helen Clark issued a statement saying the episode sounded "revolting", but that the network was free to air it. One advertiser withdrew their ads from CanWest's networks. Catholic group Family Life International set up a website for boycotting CanWest's other advertisers. Another company named C4 Productions, which has no links to the C4 music channel, applied for a court order on the eve of the airing to stop the episode, citing damage to its business because it thought people would link it to the channel. The judge ruled against the order. C4 aired the episode on February 22, 2006 and drew 210,000 viewers, six times South Park's normal audience for the channel. After receiving 102 formal complaints from viewers, the network issued a statement a month later saying "C4 acknowledges the strength of feeling in relation to the program, and we sincerely apologize for any offense taken".

In June 2006, complaints received by New Zealand's Broadcasting Standards Authority (BSA) were rejected: The airing of the show was found to not be in breach of broadcasting standards. According to the BSA, "[b]ut showing disrespect does not amount to the sort of vicious or vitriolic attack normally associated with the denigration standard". They also said the episode was "of such a farcical, absurd and unrealistic nature that it did not breach standards of good taste and decency in the context in which it was offered". New Zealand Catholic bishops have decided to appeal the decision.

=== In Australia ===
In February 2006, Archbishop Denis Hart in Melbourne, Australia wrote to television network SBS asking them not to air the episode. The network's programming director originally rejected the request, but later decided to postpone the episode citing the controversy over the Jyllands-Posten Muhammad cartoons. The episode was, however, shown on The Comedy Channel, on August 30, 2006.
