= Dick Hanley =

Dick or Richard Hanley may refer to:

- Dick Hanley (American football) (1894–1970), American football player and coach
- Dick Hanley (swimmer) (1936–2022), American swimmer
- Richard Hanley, Zambian-born Australian philosopher
