= South Park and Philosophy: You Know, I Learned Something Today =

2006 book edited by Robert Arp

- Book cover
- Author: Robert Arp
- Language: English
- Series: The Blackwell Philosophy & Pop Culture Series: South Park and Philosophy
- Subject: Philosophy, Popular culture
- Genre: non-fiction
- Publisher: Blackwell Publishing
- Publication date: December 1, 2006
- Publication place: United States
- Pages: 256
- ISBN: 1-4051-6160-4

South Park and Philosophy: You Know, I Learned Something Today is the first non-fiction book in Blackwell Publishing Company's Philosophy & Pop Culture series and is edited by philosopher and ontologist, Robert Arp, at the time assistant professor of philosophy at Southwest Minnesota State University. The series itself is edited by William Irwin, who is a professor of philosophy at King's College, Pennsylvania in Wilkes-Barre, Pennsylvania. The book utilizes the five classic branches of Western philosophy, namely, metaphysics, epistemology, ethics, political philosophy, and logic, in order to analyze episodes of South Park as well as place the show in a context of current popular culture.

The book was published December 1, 2006. The following year, South Park and Philosophy: Bigger, Longer, and More Penetrating—volume 26 of Open Court Publishing Company's Popular Culture and Philosophy series—was published, with editing by philosopher Richard Hanley.

== Synopsis ==
The book includes contributions from twenty-two academics in the field of philosophy. Topics include issues of sexuality involved in depicting Saddam Hussein and Satan as gay lovers, existentialism as applied to the death of Kenny, and a debate about whether feminists can enjoy the show due to some of its misogynistic characters. The contributors to the work utilize philosophical concepts derived from Plato, Aristotle, Freud and Sartre and place them in a South Park context.

The book's contributors all attempted to analyze the philosophical and cultural aspects of South Park in the work. One of the authors, David Koepsell, wrote about the controversial episode dealing with Scientology, entitled: "Trapped in the Closet". Koepsell cited the fact that the series won a Peabody Award due to its willingness to criticize intolerance in April 2006 as a "special concern for criticizing and countering intolerance", and the notion that "the Church of Scientology suffers from the widely held perceptions that it seeks to silence former members and others who criticize its beliefs and practices" as the motivation behind the episode. Koepsell analyzed Comedy Central's reaction to the episode itself, in a section of his book entitled "2005–2006: Comedy Central Caves". He mentions South Park's usage of the onscreen caption "this is what Scientologists actually believe". in the episode, noting that the same device was used in the episode "All About the Mormons?". In referencing this similar use of the onscreen caption device, Koepsell seemed to point to an inconsistency in the behavior of Comedy Central relative to the episode. He explained "By a long shot, this show was more kind to Scientology than was "All About the Mormons" to Mormonism." He noted Comedy Central had suggested it would not rebroadcast the episode for the second time, though it later announced on July 12, 2006, that it would.

== Reception ==
A review in The Boston Herald called the work an "indispensable collection of thought-provoking essays". The book was featured on The Book Show radio program on the Australian Broadcasting Corporation. Host Lynne Mitchell wrote that most of the contributors to the book succeeded in teaching philosophy to the reader while discussing the various South Park episodes. However Mitchell also commented that she was annoyed by a pretend interview by the editor with the creators of South Park, which she felt was made up in "a kind of South Park pastiche". A review in Publishers Weekly stated that "some of the writers' attempts at lowbrow humor can be embarrassingly off-mark", but also noted that pop-philosophy devotees and South Park fans with a philosophical bent will enjoy the book.
