= Free Willzyx =

- South Park episode
- Episode no.: Season 9 Episode 13
- Directed by: Trey Parker
- Written by: Trey Parker
- Production code: 913
- Original air date: November 30, 2005

Episode chronology
← Previous "Trapped in the Closet"	Next → "Bloody Mary"
- South Park season 9

"Free Willzyx" (/ˈwɪlziæk/ WIL-zee-ak) is the thirteenth episode in the ninth season of the American animated television series South Park. The 138th overall episode, it originally aired on Comedy Central in the United States on November 30, 2005. In the episode, which parodies the film Free Willy, Kyle, Stan, Cartman and Kenny go to an amusement park, where aquarium employees prank them into thinking the orca Jambu is telling them he needs to be sent back to the Moon where he truly belongs or else he will die; the prank backfires as the boys embark on a misguided mission to set him free.

== Plot ==
The boys are at Sea Park where they are watching the antics of an orca whale named Jambu. While Stan, Cartman and Kenny go elsewhere, Kyle stays behind. While getting a closer look at Jambu, Kyle is surprised to hear the whale speak, unaware the voice is really coming from Brian, a show announcer, and his co-announcer Mike. Jambu tells Kyle about his dream to one day go to space in a big rocket ship. Kyle brings the other boys back to the tank, but for a while, Jambu remains silent. A few minutes later, when the announcers notice the boys' return, Jambu starts to speak again. The boys think that Jambu, whose real name is "Willzyx", will die unless he returns to his family's home on the Moon.

The boys rally some of their classmates to help them liberate Jambu. They put together a plan that involves the pool from Clyde's backyard, Timmy's wheelchair, the Russian government and all of their skateboards. The boys sneak into Sea Park, dressed in dark clothing and wearing blackface (except for Token, who is actually black and wearing whiteface instead), manage to free Jambu. The next morning at the Sea Park, Mike and Brian find that the boys stole Jambu, and Mike starts panicking knowing that their prank has gotten out of hand, but Brian tries to calm him down by saying what they have done was funny. Rather than tell their colleagues about the prank and risk being fired, Mike and Brian decide that they must find the boys and retrieve Jambu before the police do.

In Russia, the government is looking for a way to raise money and they take a call from Kyle who wants to hire them to take Willzyx to the Moon. When they give their price of $20 million, Kyle tries to explain what they are really trying to do, but the Russians assume that this is a prank call from George W. Bush. The boys decide to shop around for another Third World country with a cheaper space program, and they need to hide the whale. At the Sea Park in Denver, protesters from the Animal Liberation Front have gathered to applaud the whale liberators. Brian and Mike are in South Park looking for the whale; they find the pool behind Clyde's house, along with a broken fence. While looking at the pool, they find whale feces, but see that the whale and the boys are gone. The whale is inside, in Kyle's bedroom to be exact, where the boys are keeping him wet. Kyle is on the phone with the Japanese government, while Jimmy, Timmy and Tweek are at the Chinese embassy, but everyone's prices are too high. Stan and Craig are in Mexico, where they find that Mexicano Aeronáutica y Spacio Administración (MASA) will take their whale to the moon for $200.

Kyle, Kenny, Cartman, Butters and Clyde are on the road to meet Stan and Craig in Tijuana to get the whale home when Brian and Mike stop their truck. Just as the hosts are about to tell the boys the truth, the police arrive and demand that they give the whale back. However, the ALF comes to their rescue as the whale is saved in a hail of gunfire, killing Mike, the police officers and possibly the truck driver the boys hired. The ALF leader drives the van for the boys as they resume their trip to Tijuana, while Brian sadly exclaims to a dying Mike the past times were always funny. In Tijuana, the rocket is being prepared. The ALF leader and the boys crash through the Mexican border, and the boys work on getting the whale into the water. Just before they do, Kyle says a tearful goodbye to him, which also brings tears to Clyde's and Butters' eyes. The whale finally gets into the water, and the ALF declares victory when the manager of Sea Park arrives with the police. The rocket is finally launched, with the whale in tow, much to the horror and disbelief of the ALF members. Brian, next to a now dead Mike, laughs at the absurdity of the situation as he watches Jambu rocket to space (Brian's fate is never revealed). The boys celebrate their victory back home, seeing the night sky of a black speck on the Moon of the whale; meanwhile, on the surface of the Moon, the asphyxiated orca lies dead.

== Production ==
According to the DVD commentary, "Free Willzyx" was a "very last minute" episode because the season was nearing its end and Trey Parker and Matt Stone had "no ideas". The episode's plot evolved from the idea of having an image of a dead whale on the Moon. Once it was decided that this would be the final shot at the end of the episode, the rest of the story was about how to get the whale on the Moon. Despite the episode being "last minute", Parker and Stone really liked the episode because they felt it was "a great example of a simple idea done well", as opposed to an episode filled with too many ideas, which they felt was the case with "Marjorine", the ninth episode of this season.

The appearance of one of the park workers that pranks the boys, the one with a beard, is based on the appearance of Kyle McCulloch, a member of the writing staff. McCulloch was originally going to voice the character as well, but Parker and Stone were dissatisfied with his voice work. The character's appearance was based on McCulloch because Parker and Stone felt that McCulloch would actually do what the character does in real life. In one scene, the park staff are playing a video game resembling the Mortal Kombat video game series.

In the episode, when the two park workers are looking for the whale, they show one of the boys' parents a realistically drawn sketch of Kyle, Cartman, Kenny and Stan. According to the South Park Studios FAQ, the model for Stan and Kyle was Nico Agnone, a voice actor who formerly worked for the show. The image was drawn by storyboard/production artist supervisor Adrien Beard and storyboard/production artist Valerie Fletcher. The drawing was originally going to be a primitive stick figure, but Parker felt that the joke had been done before. Parker settled on the idea of having it be a facial composite sketch because "our drawings are so shitty anyway it could be the reverse of that". The construction of the drawings themselves sparked debate because everybody had their own vision of what the boys would look like in real life.

After the Russian Government demands $20 million to send Willzyx to space, Stan says "They were going to do it for that 'N Sync guy." 'N Sync singer Lance Bass was training to be the third civilian in space, but was unable to come up with the $20 million demanded by MirCorp.
