= Wing (singer) =

Hong Kong/New Zealand singer (born 1960)

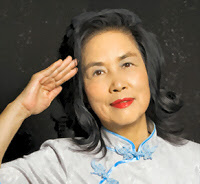
- Born: Wing Han Tsang c. 1960 (age 65–66)
- Died: 2017 (aged 56–57)
- Occupation: Singer

Chinese name
Transcriptions
Standard Mandarin
- Hanyu Pinyin: Zēng Yǒnghán
Yue: Cantonese
- Jyutping: Cang4 Wing6 Hon4
- Musical career
- Origin: Hong Kong; New Zealand
- Genres: Outsider music Show tunes Pop music Soft rock
- Instruments: Vocals, electronic keyboard
- Years active: 2005–2015
- Website: wingmusic.co.nz

Wing
- Traditional Chinese: 曾咏韓
- Simplified Chinese: 曾咏韩
Transcriptions
Standard Mandarin
- Hanyu Pinyin: Zēng Yǒnghán
- Wade–Giles: Tseng Yunghan
- IPA: [tsə́ŋ jʊ̀ŋxǎn]
Yue: Cantonese
- Yale Romanization: Dzeng Yunghan
- Jyutping: Cang^{4} Wing^{6} Hon^{4}
- IPA: [tsɐ̏ŋ wɪ̀ŋ.hɔ̏ːn]

Wing Han Tsang (Chinese: 曾咏韓; pinyin: Zēng Yǒnghán; 1960 – 2017), known professionally by the mononym Wing, was a Hong-Kong-born New Zealand singer. Her singing style has drawn comparisons to Florence Foster Jenkins and Mrs. Miller. Wing's style is an example of outsider music.

== Career ==
Having taken up singing as a hobby after immigrating to New Zealand, Wing gained an audience by entertaining patients at nursing homes and hospitals in and around Auckland. This prompted suggestions that she release a CD; the result was a debut titled Phantom of the Opera, featuring the title song from the Andrew Lloyd Webber musical, and a selection of other popular tunes to the accompaniment of a programmed electronic keyboard.

Despite her unconventional style, the recording proved a success, leading to a number of subsequent releases of cover versions that eventually gained Wing an international audience.

Wing has appeared on such shows as SportsCafe and Rove Live. She guest-starred on South Park in an episode named after her that was first broadcast in March 2005. On the DVD commentary for this episode, series creators Trey Parker and Matt Stone explained that Wing had to approve her cartoon likeness before allowing her music to be used. Parker also stated that he received a letter of thanks from Wing for the sales-boost she enjoyed as a result of the episode.

In addition to recordings, Wing has made various appearances in New Zealand, like Massey University Orientation in Wellington. She later performed as part of the 2008 South by Southwest festival.

On 11 May 2008, Wing performed on the BBC Introducing-stage at Radio 1's Big Weekend, singing versions of ABBA's "Dancing Queen" and "Mamma Mia", as well as Elton John's "Candle in the Wind". DJ Scott Mills, who had played Wing during his Radio 1 drivetime shows, had to personally pay to fly her over so she could sing at the festival, in Maidstone.

Wing appeared on New Zealand music TV station, C4, in June 2008 for their series Rocked the Nation, where she sang "Pokarekare Ana".

Wing toured the United States in late 2009. From 25–26 October, she appeared at the Birdland Jazz Club in New York City. On 2 November, Wing performed at Rrazz Room in San Francisco.

In 2015, Wing announced that she had retired from the music business, via her official website.

After retiring from music in 2015, she became ill and returned to Hong Kong to live with relatives, where she died in 2017.

== Discography ==
=== Albums ===
- Phantom of the Opera
- I Could Have Danced All Night
- The Sound of Music and the Prayer
- Wing Sings The Carpenters
- Wing Sings All Your Favourites
- Everyone Sings Carols with Wing
- Wing Sings the Songs You Love
- Beatles Classics by Wing
- Dancing Queen by Wing
- Wing Sings Elvis
- Breathe
- One Voice
- Too Much Heaven
- Wing Sings For All The Single Ladies And Raps For All The Safe Parties
- Television Radio Heroes (2012)

=== EPs ===
- Carols – rap and sing a beautiful Christmas (5 songs)
- Beat It (4 songs)
- Stop The Nonsense (featuring Rappy McRapperson) (4 songs)
- Wing Sings More AC/DC (4 songs)

=== Singles ===
- Wing Sings AC/DC
- Safe Computer (featuring Rappy McRapperson)
- Santa Claus on a Helicopter
