= Wing (South Park) =

- South Park episode
- Episode no.: Season 9 Episode 3
- Directed by: Trey Parker
- Written by: Trey Parker
- Production code: 903
- Original air date: March 23, 2005

Guest appearances
- Wing as Herself; Lou Rawls as Token's singing voice

Episode chronology
| ← Previous "Die Hippie, Die" | Next → "Best Friends Forever" |
- South Park season 9

"Wing" is the third episode in the ninth season of the American animated television series South Park. It was written by series co-creator Trey Parker and first aired on Comedy Central in the United States on March 23, 2005. The episode was the 128th overall and was named after New Zealand singer Wing, who stars in the episode in an eponymous part loosely based on herself. The message of the episode equates talent agents to Chinese slave traders.

== Plot ==
Upon hearing that Token has won a contest that will allow him to sing at a Colorado beauty pageant and receive $200, Stan, Cartman, Kyle and Kenny decide to set up the "Super Awesome Talent Agency" and obtain 10% of his earnings by becoming his agents. However, they lose Token to Creative Artists Agency, only to land a singer named Wing, who is the wife of the City Wok owner, Tuong Lu Kim. Recently smuggled into the United States by the Triads, Wing has been set to audition for American Idol, and the boys agree to bring her to Los Angeles for the competition. This venture does not go as planned, and the boys instead enter Wing into The Contender, a television series about boxing. Sylvester Stallone is impressed with her singing, even as she is beaten, and gives Wing a chance to sing at his son's wedding, which will give the boys a 10% share of $4,000.

However, by this time, Wing has been kidnapped by the Triads for not paying the $10,000 owed to them for getting her into the States. The boys go after Wing to get back their client. Both the Triads and the boys are unaware of the other's intentions; the boys mistake the Triads for the Creative Artists Agency, the agency that stole Token, while the Triads think the boys are a rival group. In a shootout at the Triads' headquarters, Kenny is killed, and Kyle inadvertently manages to kill two Triad guards. Stan concludes with a monologue about how Wing is a human being and that people's lives should not be sold as commodities which makes the boys and the Triads realize that their businesses are dirty and exploit the hopes of others. They all decide to quit and go to listen to Wing sing at the wedding, only to find Token waiting tables, trying to earn enough money to get back home as CAA did nothing for him, much to Cartman's delight.

== Production ==
The character of Wing was based on Wing Han Tsang (曾詠韓), a New Zealand singer of Hong Kong origin. All of the songs the character performs in the episode (including the ABBA songs "Dancing Queen" and "Fernando", and the song "Sing") are actually the real-life Wing singing, taken from previous audio recordings. On the DVD commentary for this episode, series creators Trey Parker and Matt Stone explain that they decided to do a show about Wing after a friend led them to her site. They thought that the whole idea of this singer was either a "super sweet joke" or a "super sweet not joke", but continued to listen to more of her music, especially whenever they were frustrated. Parker and Stone contacted Wing on using her songs, and she had to approve her cartoon likeness before allowing her music to be used. Parker also says he received a letter of thanks from her for the sales boost she enjoyed as a result of the episode.

At the pageant, Token performs the song "You'll Never Find Another Love Like Mine" by Lou Rawls. His singing voice was not provided by the usual dubbing actor Adrien Beard, but is in fact the original Lou Rawls recording of the song. However, Rawls' voice is sped up to the same pitch that all of the actor's voices are shifted to sound childlike.
