= Two Days Before the Day After Tomorrow =

- South Park episode
- Episode no.: Season 9 Episode 8
- Directed by: Trey Parker
- Written by: Trey Parker
- Production code: 908
- Original air date: October 19, 2005

Episode chronology
← Previous "Erection Day"	Next → "Marjorine"
- South Park season 9

"Two Days Before the Day After Tomorrow" is the eighth episode in the ninth season of the American animated television series South Park. The 133rd episode overall, it originally aired on Comedy Central in the United States on October 19, 2005.

In the episode, Stan and Cartman accidentally destroy a beaver dam, which causes a catastrophic flood in the nearby town of Beaverton. To avoid punishment, the boys allow the townfolk to be misled into believing that the dam's destruction was caused by global warming, which triggers panic and mayhem around Colorado and across the country.

The episode was co-written by series co-creator Trey Parker and Kenny Hotz. It parodies Roland Emmerich's 2004 film The Day After Tomorrow, which was released by 20th Century Fox with Lions Gate Films, and also general responses to Hurricane Katrina, particularly the various ad hoc explanations for the increased level of suffering from the hurricane and its aftermath.

== Plot ==
Stan and Cartman are playing in a boat that Cartman claims is his uncle's when Cartman dares Stan to drive the boat, claiming he will take the blame if trouble arises. However, as Stan does not know how to drive a boat, they crash into the world's largest beaver dam, flooding the town of Beaverton. Cartman reveals that he lied about the boat belonging to his uncle and convinces Stan to try to hide their involvement by maintaining complete silence about the incident.

Meanwhile, the flood has a worse outcome than Stan expected. The people of Beaverton are in a state of disaster. Nobody tries to help the situation; instead, everybody would rather figure out who is to blame. At a conference at the Governor's office with top Colorado scientists and government officials, they all declare that the disaster is the result of global warming. At first, it is determined the full effects will take place on "the day after tomorrow". However, some scientists suddenly burst in and state that it has been proven that the disaster will take place "two days before the day after tomorrow".

The declaration of the scientists causes mass hysteria, and everybody runs from "global warming". Most of the South Park people crowd in the community center. Randy authoritatively states that global warming is causing an ice age outside that would kill them if they left.

Stan admits to Kyle that he and Cartman were the cause of the Beaverton flood (although Stan takes most of the blame). The trio then set off to rescue the people by boat. The attempt is a disaster in itself, as they wind up crashing into an oil refinery, compounding the problems of the stranded people, who now must deal with drowning and fire. Meanwhile, Randy, Gerald, and Stephen brave the supposed ice age to find their sons. Dressed in heavy arctic mountaineering gear despite the mild weather, the trio quickly collapse in the street due to heat exhaustion and dehydration, but mistake their symptoms as the "last stages of hypothermia."

The boys nearly escape to the roof of the flooded and burning refinery, but Cartman claims that "all Jews carry gold in a little bag around their necks", and holds Kyle at gunpoint, demanding his "Jew gold," not wanting to be poor in a supposedly changing world. Kyle inexplicably has the gold, along with a fake bag, but he throws it into the destroyed refinery to spite Cartman. After this, boys are rescued by an Army helicopter and fly back to South Park where the Army declares that Crab People, not global warming, are responsible for breaking the dam. In exasperation, Stan finally admits that he broke the dam, but one of the townspeople incorrectly interprets his admission as a lesson to stop obsessing over who to blame while ignoring the problem. The townspeople all begin to declare, "I broke the dam", with Cartman joining in knowing that he won't get in trouble now, while Stan tries unsuccessfully to explain that he literally did it, with a boat. Stan gets angry and finally just shouts, "Oh, fuck it!"

== Cultural references ==
This episode parodies the response to Hurricane Katrina, particularly the various ad hoc explanations for the increased level of suffering from the hurricane and its aftermath. In addition, the episode parodies the misplaced anger and unwillingness to negotiate between all the parties in the Katrina relief effort, the distorted media coverage that occurred during the hurricane's aftermath, and the Houston mass evacuation during Hurricane Rita. For instance, when the people conclude that George Bush was the cause of the beaver dam being broken, someone says "George Bush doesn't care about beavers!" in a parody of Kanye West's quote, "George Bush doesn't care about black people." In addition, during the evacuation, only white people are rescued, while a black man can be seen left stranded. This references the accusations of selectively racist rescue efforts and media coverage during the Hurricane Katrina crisis.

"Two Days Before the Day After Tomorrow" also parodies the 2004 film The Day After Tomorrow, and general responses to global warming. For instance, the scene where Stan calls his father on the phone while the water level rises is a reference to a similar scene in The Day After Tomorrow where Sam calls his father while trying to outlast the fatal coldness. Several other scenes from the film are parodied in the episode. The final scene where everyone says "I broke the dam" is a reference to the 1960 film Spartacus where the title character comes forward as Spartacus, and the slave-crowd all claim to be Spartacus in an effort to protect him.

The scene in which Cartman confronts Kyle over his "Jew gold", in the flooded fuel factory, is a reference to the final scene of the 1976 film Marathon Man, in which a fugitive Nazi war criminal confronts a detective who has taken his diamonds, stolen from Holocaust victims, and is preventing the Nazi from cashing in on them.
