= Best Friends Forever (South Park) =

- South Park episode
- Episode no.: Season 9 Episode 4
- Directed by: Trey Parker
- Written by: Trey Parker
- Production code: 904
- Original air date: March 30, 2005

Episode chronology
| ← Previous "Wing" | Next → "The Losing Edge" |
- South Park season 9

"Best Friends Forever" is the fourth episode in the ninth season of the American animated television series South Park. The 129th episode overall, it was written and directed by co-creator Trey Parker and first aired on Comedy Central in the United States on March 30, 2005. In the episode, Kenny is deliberately killed by heaven's occupants after becoming master of the PSP in order for him to save them. However, the town brings him back to life, leaving him in a persistent vegetative state.

The episode is based on the Terri Schiavo case and won a 2005 Emmy Award for Outstanding Animated Program. It aired mere hours before Schiavo died and received positive reviews from critics for its portrayal of the media frenzy that surrounded the Schiavo case. The episode introduces Kenny's little sister, Karen.

== Plot ==
Kenny is the first person in South Park to have a new PSP video game system and simply cannot put it down. Kenny quickly works his way up to level 60 of the game Heaven vs. Hell, but soon after is run over by an ice-cream truck and dies.

After entering Heaven, Kenny learns that God had created the PSP to search for what the angels call "our Keanu Reeves"—the person who can command his legions against Satan's forces of Hell in a manner like that of the video game. Thanks to God allowing only Mormons into heaven, Hell's legions greatly outnumber heaven's forces. So much so God was forced to lift that rule to attempt to cut into the recruitment pool. Kenny agrees to take the challenge, but he is revived just after hearing this. Because he had been dead for so long, he cannot talk or communicate, and has suffered permanent brain damage. He is kept alive through the use of a feeding tube. The reading of Kenny's will to Kyle, Stan, and Cartman is interrupted by the announcement that Kenny is still alive. The lawyer mentions a passage about Kenny's wishes in the event of him being in a vegetative state, but the last page of the will is missing, preventing them from finding out what his wishes were.

As Satan's army begins to close in, the angels need Kenny dead so that they can win the battle of the Apocalypse. Meanwhile, Cartman, claiming his status as Kenny's "best friend forever" to the Colorado Supreme Court with the first half of the BFF medallion, gets an order to take out the feeding tube, and he removes the tube after tracking down and finding Kenny's other BFF medallion half so he can get the PSP upon Kenny's death (it's implied that Cartman himself put the other medallion around Kenny's neck). Stan and Kyle, along with Kenny's parents and other protesters, wage a media war to put the feeding tube back in and keep Kenny alive, while Cartman enlists supporters of the rights of "best friends forever" to get Kenny's feeding tube removed.

Meanwhile back in Hell, Satan and his minion Kevin conspire to have Kenny's feeding tube kept inside him, to prevent his soul from being in Heaven. Kevin manipulates George W. Bush during a political speech into arguing in favor of keeping Kenny alive, with the President literally saying Kevin's machinations aloud towards the end of his speech, much to Kevin's annoyance.

After a long, intensive media campaign, the two sides are arguing in Kenny's hospital suite when Kenny's lawyer announces that the last page of the will has been found, and that Kenny's wishes were that if he were ever in a vegetative state, "please, for the love of God...don't ever show me in that condition on national television". The two sides realize that they have both been disrespectful of Kenny's wishes. Kyle then realizes they should not have made this issue into such a media circus, and concludes that Kenny should be taken off his feeding tube, commenting that Cartman was "right, for the wrong reasons", while he and Stan were "wrong, for the right reasons". Everyone in the hospital room agrees with Kyle and quietly leaves, allowing Kenny to die. Kenny returns to Heaven just in time to command the angels to victory using a golden PSP. After the victory, Kenny is presented with a golden statue of Keanu Reeves as a reward for defeating Satan's army, and Satan, annoyed that Kevin has "once again" screwed up, breaks up with him and kills him with a blast of energy.

== Production ==
"Best Friends Forever" revolves around the Terri Schiavo case, and originally aired in the midst of the controversy. In the DVD commentary for the episode, Trey Parker and Matt Stone called "Best Friends Forever" a "very last minute episode". They already had the idea for "The Losing Edge" and were about to start work on it. However, the Terri Schiavo case had just entered a "media frenzy" so Parker and Stone felt as though they needed to do an episode about it; they saw it as the biggest news story since the September 11 attacks. Parker and Stone worked quickly to come up with ideas and felt that they had the structure of the episode finished within 30 minutes.

The episode is also partially based on the 1984 film The Last Starfighter.

During the production of the episode, there was a "big debate" within the writing team about the ending. The debate was about whether or not to show the actual battle between Heaven and Hell. Eventually, the decision was made to go with the "joke version" consisting of the angel narrating the battle as opposed to a large scale scene because Parker and Stone wanted more emphasis on the Terri Schiavo story. The decision was also more beneficial to the show because it meant less animation had to be done.

The episode was originally going to be a two-part story split between two episodes, but following Schiavo's death mere hours after the episode aired, Parker and Stone felt that they could not and should not do a two-parter.

== Reception ==
This episode won a 2005 Emmy Award in the category of "Outstanding Animated Program (For Programming Less Than One Hour)". This is the first time the show has beaten other nominees, such as The Simpsons and other winners. It also became the fourth prime time animated cartoon, and the first cable TV series, to win the award, behind The Simpsons, King of the Hill and Futurama.

"Best Friends Forever" received mostly positive reviews for its portrayal of the Terri Schiavo case. In her book The Deep End of South Park, Leslie Stratyner applauds the episode for its ability to "tackle such challenging issues as... right to die in 'Best Friends Forever'... its 'devil-may-care' attitude that has brought a fair amount of acclaim". On a different aspect of the controversy, Jonathan Gray commented that the "twist at the end with Kenny's final page of the will... illustrates just how crazy people become about everyday issues. The only thing Kenny didn't want came true as a result of those two sides". Writing for the Chicago Sun Times, Jeff Shannon described the episode thus: "Clearly aware that taking sides in the right-to-life debate would be a divisive, no-win strategy, Parker and Stone aimed their satirical arrows at the one aspect of the Schiavo case that's indisputably offensive: the horrendous media circus that turned a private matter into a shamefully public spectacle." Jeffrey Weinstock, in Taking South Park Seriously, praised the episode for its parody of the government and how it "derides the use of government to enforce a narrowly-defined 'right-to-life' moral agenda presented as representative of God's will, a tactic predominantly associated with right-conservatives".
