= The Death of Eric Cartman =

- South Park episode
- Episode no.: Season 9 Episode 6
- Directed by: Trey Parker
- Written by: Trey Parker
- Production code: 906
- Original air date: April 13, 2005

Episode chronology
← Previous "The Losing Edge"	Next → "Erection Day"
- South Park season 9

"The Death of Eric Cartman" is the sixth episode of the ninth season of the American animated television series South Park. The 131st episode overall, it was first broadcast on Comedy Central in the United States on April 13, 2005. In the episode, the other boys begin to ignore Cartman for eating all of the chicken skin off of an order of Kentucky Fried Chicken. This leads Cartman to believe that he has died and is now a ghost. Cartman tries to get into heaven by doing "good deeds", forcing a naive Butters to do all the deeds for him.

"The Death of Eric Cartman" was written and directed by series co-creator Trey Parker, based on an idea he came up with while hiking on vacation.

== Plot ==
Stan, Kyle, Cartman, and Kenny wait at Stan's house for Stan's mom to come home with KFC for dinner. When she arrives, the boys help her unload her groceries, but Cartman remains behind, eats all the chicken skin, and goes home to sit on the toilet and read comic books having no remorse for what he did. Kenny starts wailing vehemently after seeing the half-eaten chicken. Enraged, Stan, Kyle, and Kenny decide Cartman has finally crossed the line and start ignoring him and then the other boys in their class go along. Cartman, unable to conceive that anyone would ignore him, thinks he is dead and has become a ghost. Cartman's mother has a new toilet installed after Cartman destroys it with his chicken skin defecations. Cartman goes home and mistakenly believes that the toilet is his body when he sees a box being carried out of the house by plumbers. Cartman also hears his mother cry and believes that she is crying over his death. However, Cartman's mother is actually moaning while having sex with one of the other plumbers.

However, Butters is not privy to the plan and greets Cartman as he passes by in a state of despair. Cartman convinces Butters that he is a ghost, terrifying him. Cartman threatens to haunt Butters unless he helps his soul achieve peace. Cartman first has Butters apologize to everyone on his behalf, which fails to impress his ex-friends but gets his mother crying. Cartman makes emotional goodbyes to Butters, believing that he will now be permitted to go to Heaven. When this fails, Butters suggests he might need to atone for all the terrible things he has done. Cartman draws up a long list and delivers gift baskets to all his victims, including Sally Struthers, Scott Tenorman, and Kyle's synagogue. When this, too, fails, Cartman destroys Butters' room with a baseball bat and leaves his house before Butters' parents turn up. A doctor is called and decides that Butters might suffer from a deep trauma. To make sure, Butters is taken to a mental institution and subjected to a series of tests (one of which includes a violent anal probing). Now genuinely traumatized, Butters accepts that he has been imagining Cartman's visits, but Cartman breaks into the asylum to get his help again.

The two consult a psychic, who suggests that God has kept Cartman on Earth to help with a crisis. She runs screaming when Butters points to Cartman as the ghost. When they hear of a hostage situation at a Red Cross Center, Cartman and Butters set off; and Cartman stops the criminals by moving things around in the style of a poltergeist. The robbers are merely befuddled, which nonetheless provides a distraction for Butters to release the hostages and the police to subdue the criminals. The two are credited with saving the day. Cartman and Butters exchange protestations of friendship once again; but the other boys turn up and praise Cartman's heroic behavior, thinking that he has truly changed. Cartman now realizes that he was merely being ignored and again goes berserk, blaming Butters for his own misunderstanding and threatening retaliation. Butters' parents arrive with the doctor with the probe, and Butters realizes that he is going back to the asylum.

== Production ==
Trey Parker says on the DVD commentary that he got the main idea for the episode while hiking on vacation in Tasmania, Australia. This is significant because Parker felt it was refreshing to have an idea just come to him rather than having to actively try to come up with ideas with the rest of the writing staff. Parker said he instantly had everything worked out except for what it would be that Cartman did to anger the other boys. It wasn't until late in the production of the episode, when nearly all animation was finished, that the opening scene was finalized. Parker, Matt Stone, and the rest of the writing crew were eating KFC one day when somebody mentioned how annoying it would have been if somebody just ate all the skin off the chicken before they ate it. They decided to go ahead with this idea because it seemed to slot in so perfectly.

The series' running gag of Cartman waking up Butters by calling his name out menacingly while standing next to his bed originated in this episode. The episode is included on the two-disc DVD collection The Cult of Cartman.
