= The Losing Edge =

- South Park episode
- Episode no.: Season 9 Episode 5
- Directed by: Trey Parker
- Written by: Trey Parker
- Production code: 905
- Original air date: April 6, 2005

Guest appearance
- Diedrich Bader as Bat Dad

Episode chronology
← Previous "Best Friends Forever"	Next → "The Death of Eric Cartman"

"The Losing Edge" is the fifth episode in the ninth season of the American animated television series South Park, and the 130th episode of the series overall. It originally aired on Comedy Central in the United States on April 6, 2005.

In the episode, the boys try to lose their baseball games on purpose so that they can enjoy the summer playing video games rather than deal with baseball. Meanwhile, Randy trains to fight the other fathers at the games.

== Plot ==
None of the boys playing for the South Park Little League Baseball team enjoy the sport at all. They find it boring and only play because of their parents' enthusiasm for it. When they win their final game, the whole team is overjoyed at first, believing that the season is over and they can now enjoy the summer. However, to their horror, the boys discover that since they have finished first in their division, they must participate in the postseason tournament. At a "celebration" meal, the boys discuss plans to lose on purpose without getting in trouble with their parents.

During the playoffs, the boys learn that the other teams also want to lose and have actually trained to lose games. The South Park team ends up winning again and again against opponents whose efforts at throwing games are more successful, and they reach the state championship against Denver. If they win, the South Park team will have to spend their entire summer playing baseball on the national circuit.

Meanwhile, Stan's father, Randy, has taken up trash-talking as a hobby, getting drunk and acting obnoxiously at the games in order to start fights with the fathers of other teams' players. This behavior leads to him being arrested many times. While training to be the best fighter he can be, Randy becomes terrified after meeting the Denver Little League team's "Bat Dad" (Diedrich Bader), who wears a purple Batman cowl and cape, and who is both heavier and more misbehaved than Randy. As a result, Randy decides not to attend the championship game in fear that he is not good enough.

The game is played at Coors Field; like South Park's other opponents, the Denver team does not want to win either. The boys have drafted Kyle's nerdy cousin Kyle Schwartz, who is terrible at all sports, in the hope of ruining their chances to win. However, the Denver team is the best yet at intentionally losing; they can even bat themselves out by hitting the ball directly into an outfielder's glove. Just as the South Park team find themselves on the verge of winning, Randy appears in the stands and provokes a fight with Bat Dad that spills onto the field; the officials warn the two fathers that the next one who fights will get his team disqualified. Though Randy gets knocked down, the boys' cheering, combined with a hallucination of a crowd including Mickey Goldmill and Sharon (who has been critical of Randy's hooliganism throughout the episode) cheering him on, inspires him to stand up and continue fighting before finally knocking out Bat Dad. This results in the South Park team's disqualification and Denver's victory by default. Randy feels dejected at having cost the South Park team the championship as he is placed under arrest, but Stan lifts Randy's spirits by thanking him for doing so. Randy ends the episode leaping for joy while under police custody.

== Production ==
The episode's idea originally came from series co-creators Trey Parker and Matt Stone thinking that the children of South Park would look cute in baseball uniforms. Parker and Stone also were not fans of baseball themselves so it made sense to have the boys hate baseball. The choice to go ahead with a baseball-themed episode did create some problems animation-wise, however, as most of the children look nearly identical wearing the same uniforms. A lot of time was spent on ensuring that each character was distinguishable from each other. For example, Butters Stotch and Stan Marsh look identical with the same attire. To rectify this, Stan's hair is more prominent than Butters' and Butters has a speaking line early. Additionally, Kenny appears with his hat slightly covering his face, making this one of Kenny's most visible episodes. The episode's plot was originally going to be used in Best Friends Forever but was put on hold when they came up with an episode based on the Terri Schiavo case instead.

According to the DVD commentary, "this was a really, really hard episode to do" because sports episodes in general are not easy but also because the teams are trying to lose. Because they are trying to lose on purpose, new rules are needed which makes it different from any actual sport. However, the character of Bat Dad made it easier for Parker and Stone, as if it got too difficult, they could cut to Bat Dad.
