= South Park season 9 =

Season of television series

South Park
- Season 9
- No. of episodes: 14

Release
- Original network: Comedy Central
- Original release: March 9 – December 7, 2005

Season chronology
- ← Previous; Season 8 Next → Season 10

The ninth season of South Park, an American animated television series created by Trey Parker and Matt Stone, began airing on March 9, 2005. The ninth season concluded after 14 episodes on December 7, 2005. All of the episodes in the ninth season were written and directed by Trey Parker.

== Episodes ==
No. overall	No. in season	Title	Directed by	Written by	Original release date	Prod. code	Viewers (millions)
126	1	"Mr. Garrison's Fancy New Vagina"	Trey Parker	Trey Parker	March 9, 2005	901	2.97
Mr. Garrison gets a sex change operation, but when he realizes he is incapable of having a period and that his boyfriend is dismissive of it, he tracks down the doctor to change him back. Meanwhile, Kyle goes to a plastic surgeon to turn himself black so he can be a star basketball player - and his father has surgery to become a dolphin.
127	2	"Die Hippie, Die"	Trey Parker	Trey Parker	March 16, 2005	902	2.36
It's up to Cartman to save the day when hippies overrun South Park, and no one listens to his warnings.
128	3	"Wing"	Trey Parker	Trey Parker	March 23, 2005	903	2.30
Token becomes a singer while the boys try to run a talent agency, and represent the City Wok owner's wife, Wing.
129	4	"Best Friends Forever"	Trey Parker	Trey Parker	March 30, 2005	904	2.72
Kenny is left in a persistent vegetative state, beginning a war between Cartman, who wants him to die so he can inherit his Sony PSP, Heaven, who needs his spirit to fight a war against hell, and Stan and Kyle, who feel he should be kept alive. Note: This episode won a 2005 Emmy Award in the category of "Outstanding Animated Program (for programming less than one hour)".
130	5	"The Losing Edge"	Trey Parker	Trey Parker	April 6, 2005	905	2.62
The boys try to lose their baseball games on purpose so they can avoid having to play all summer - but when it turns out the other teams do the same, the South Park kids form a plan so they won't have to play all summer long. Meanwhile, Randy gets into training to fight the other fathers at the games, but he might have meet his match when he butts heads with "Batdad."
131	6	"The Death of Eric Cartman"	Trey Parker	Trey Parker	April 13, 2005	906	2.61
After he eats all the skin off of the chicken Kyle, Kenny and Stan were going to eat, and his generally awful treatment towards them, the kids of South Park band together and begin to completely ignore Cartman, causing him to think that he has died. With the help of Butters, (who is the only one that can "see" him) Cartman tries to atone his sins on earth, for he cannot go to the afterlife without doing so.
132	7	"Erection Day"	Trey Parker	Trey Parker	April 20, 2005	907	2.91
Jimmy starts getting erections and worries about performing in the school talent show, so he sets out to get rid of his erections by having sex with a woman.
133	8	"Two Days Before the Day After Tomorrow"	Trey Parker	Trey Parker	October 19, 2005	908	2.49
Stan and Cartman crash a speedboat into a dam, flooding the neighboring town of Beaverton. Since neither of the boys admits what they've done, people blame everything from the president to global warming for the disaster. They spend so much time trying to assign blame, that they have no time to help the citizens of Beaverton.
134	9	"Marjorine"	Trey Parker	Trey Parker	October 26, 2005	909	2.25
Butters fakes his own death so he can pose as a girl named Marjorine and help the rest of the boys steal a paper fortune-teller, which they believe is a life-changing device.
135	10	"Follow That Egg!"	Trey Parker	Trey Parker	November 2, 2005	910	2.87
The children in Ms. Garrison's class are paired up to practice their parenting skills by taking care of eggs. Ms. Garrison realizes she still has feelings for Mr. Slave, who plans to marry Big Gay Al as soon as the Governor signs the same-sex marriage bill. Ms. Garrison, broken-hearted, tries to stop the gay-marriage bill from passing.
136	11	"Ginger Kids"	Trey Parker	Trey Parker	November 9, 2005	911	2.59
Stan and Kyle turn Cartman redheaded and pale after Cartman does a report on how dangerous redheaded children are, but the prank goes too far when Cartman leads the "gingers" to fight for their rights by any means necessary.
137	12	"Trapped in the Closet"	Trey Parker	Trey Parker	November 16, 2005	912	2.41
Stan is dubbed the reincarnation of L. Ron Hubbard by a local group of Scientologists, causing a chain of bizarre events, such as Tom Cruise and John Travolta locking themselves in Stan's closet and R&B singer R. Kelly turning the whole affair into an urban opera.
138	13	"Free Willzyx"	Trey Parker	Trey Parker	November 30, 2005	913	2.48
Two aquarium workers trick the boys into thinking that a killer whale can talk, prompting the boys to liberate the animal and send him into space.
139	14	"Bloody Mary"	Trey Parker	Trey Parker	December 7, 2005	914	2.58
Randy's drinking problem is mistaken for a disease when he admits himself into Alcoholics Anonymous following an arrest for drunk driving. At first he feels hopeless, but then a priest in a neighboring town discovers that his Virgin Mary statue is bleeding from its anus and declares it a miracle, making Randy want to go there to get cured.

== See also ==
- South Park (Park County, Colorado)
- South Park City
