= Erection Day =

- South Park episode
- Episode no.: Season 9 Episode 7
- Written by: Trey Parker
- Production code: 907
- Original air date: April 20, 2005

Episode chronology
← Previous "The Death of Eric Cartman"	Next → "Two Days Before the Day After Tomorrow"
- South Park season 9

"Erection Day" is the seventh episode in the ninth season of the American animated television series South Park. The 132nd episode overall, it first aired on Comedy Central in the United States on April 20, 2005. In the episode, South Park Elementary's talent show is coming up and everyone expects Jimmy to win. Jimmy is elated to perform his stand-up comedy routines, but begins to suffer from unwanted erections and tries to resolve the problem.

== Plot ==
Jimmy faces a dilemma because he begins to experience random erections. This makes him afraid to perform his stand-up comedy routine at the South Park Elementary Talent Show for fear that he would be embarrassed in front of the entire school. He consults Butters, the only kid in town whom he expects not to make fun of him. Butters explains to him about sexual intercourse; Jimmy concludes that if he does not want to get an erection during his performance, he should have intercourse before he goes up. He attempts to arrange a date with a girl from school, with Cartman's help. When this ultimately fails, he goes to Colfax Avenue, the red-light district of town based on a suggestion from Officer Barbrady, looking for sex.

While the talent show begins at the school, Jimmy picks up an obese, STD-ridden prostitute known as Nut-Gobbler. The naïve Jimmy attempts to woo her but her pimp comes in and, thinking she is betraying him, grabs her and goes off to kill her. Jimmy summons a taxi, and a car chase ensues. In the end, Jimmy manages to distract the pimp with his comedy routine, while Nut-Gobbler subdues him with a club to the back of the head. Jimmy, presumably after having sex with the hooker, arrives at the talent show and hurries onstage at the last minute. He begins his routine, but then suddenly gets another erection.

== Cultural references ==
- The scene where Jimmy is carrying Nut-Gobbler is a parody of the closing scene from the 1982 film An Officer and a Gentleman.
- Cartman's act in the talent show is a reference to the 1983 film Scarface.
- The restaurant that Jimmy and his dates go to, Buga de Faggoncini, is named after the restaurant chain Buca di Beppo, although, according to Parker and Stone, the actual restaurant in concept is based on Romano's Macaroni Grill.
