= Jeffrey Andrew Weinstock =

American literature, film, and media scholar

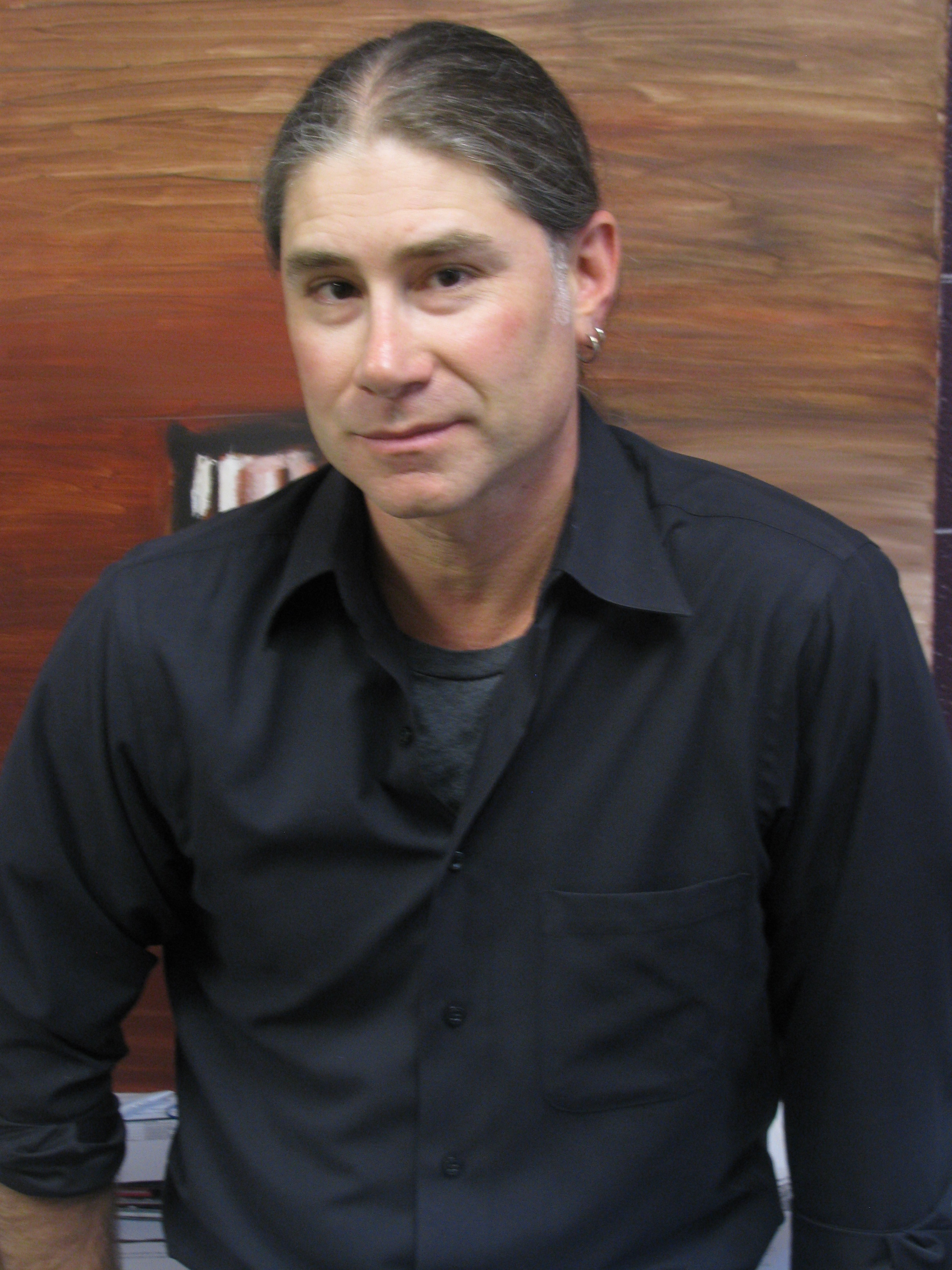
- Education: B.A., English; M.A., American Literature; M. Phil., Human Sciences; PhD, Human Sciences
- Alma mater: University of Pennsylvania, The George Washington University
- Occupation: University Professor
- Years active: 1994–present
- Employer: Central Michigan University
- Known for: Analyses of monsters, the Gothic, and cult media in American and popular culture
- Title: Professor of English Language and Literature

Jeffrey Andrew Weinstock (born January 24, 1970) is an American literature, film, and media scholar who has been teaching in the Department of English Language and Literature at Central Michigan University since 2001. He has authored or edited more than thirty books and a range of articles focusing on the American Gothic tradition, monsters, cult film and television, popular culture, weird fiction, pedagogy, and goth music.

Weinstock is the associate editor in charge of horror for the Los Angeles Review of Books, the founder and president of the Society for the Study of the American Gothic, the founder and general editor of the peer-reviewed journal American Gothic Studies, and the co-founder and past chair of the Modern Language Association’s Gothic Studies Forum. He was the 2019 recipient of the Poe Studies Association's James W. Gargano Award for the best scholarly article on Poe and the 2024 recipient of the Science Fiction Research Association’s Thomas D. Clareson Award for Distinguished Service to the field of speculative literature and media studies. Also in 2024, his monograph, Gothic Things: Dark Enchantment and Anthropocene Anxiety, was short-listed for the International Gothic Association's Allan Lloyd Smith Prize for the scholarly monograph considered to have advanced the field of Gothic studies significantly.

== Education ==
Weinstock graduated from the University of Pennsylvania with a B.A. in English. He then earned an M.A. in American literature and both an MPhil and PhD from the Program in the Human Sciences at The George Washington University. He joined the faculty of the Department of English Language and Literature at Central Michigan University in 2001.

== Research ==
Weinstock's academic work has covered a variety of research areas, but clusters around theorizing the ways in which Gothic texts and practices give shape to culturally specific anxieties and desires.

=== Monsters ===
Of particular interest to Weinstock have been the roles that monsters play in enforcing social norms while also highlighting desires to transgress those same norms. In an early article on freaks and freak shows, "Freaks in Space: ‘Extraterrestrialism’ and ‘Deep-Space Multiculturalism’," Weinstock adapts Edward Said's concept of Orientalism to address the ways in which contemporary racial stereotypes find expression in science fiction film and television through the role of the extraterrestrial.

In the introduction to the Ashgate Encyclopedia of Literary and Cinematic Monsters, the 2014 encyclopedia he edited, he draws upon the work of anthropologist Mary Douglas to discuss monsters as violations of established cultural categories whose transgression of conceptual frameworks creates anxiety. This work won the 2014 Rue Morgue Magazine "Best 2014 Non-Fiction Book" award, as well as the 2014 "Golden Ghoul" award for "Best 2014 Non-Fiction Horror Book" from the Serbian Cult of the Ghoul publication.

In "Invisible Monsters: Vision, Horror, and Contemporary Culture," his contribution to Asa Mittman and Peter Dendle's Ashgate Research Companion to Monsters and the Monstrous, Weinstock proposes that twenty-first century Western culture has decoupled monstrosity from appearance creating concerns that monsters cannot be identified in advance of their attacks. To develop this argument, he focuses on serial killers, terrorists, faceless corporations, viruses, and natural phenomena such as global warming. In "American Monsters," a chapter included in Charles L. Crow's A Companion to the American Gothic, Weinstock addresses the cultural construction of American monsters paying attention to the roles of race and religion in creating monstrous others.

In 2020, Weinstock published The Monster Theory Reader, an edited collection of writings about monsters. This was followed in 2023 by Monstrous Things: Essays on Ghosts, Vampires, and Things That Go Bump in the Night, a collection of previously published articles on monsters. Relatedly, he and Regina Hansen published the co-edited collection of scholarly essays, Giving the Devil His Due: Satan and Cinema, 2021.

=== Ghosts ===
Weinstock's interest in ghosts and hauntings began with his doctoral dissertation, Dead Letters: Ghostly Inscriptions and Theoretical Hauntings, an analysis of the "spectrality of language" indebted to the post-structural theorizing of Jacques Derrida and Jacques Lacan and focusing around the idea of the "dead letter" in the works of Edgar Allan Poe, Herman Melville, Henry James, Edith Wharton, and Toni Morrison.

The dissertation became the springboard for two later book publications related to ghosts: 2004's Spectral America: Phantoms and the American Imagination and 2008's Scare Tactics: Supernatural Fiction by American Women. In the introduction to Spectral America, Weinstock refers to the "spectral turn" of twenty-first century culture, a formulation that has resonated in later publications on ghosts and culture. In Scare Tactics, Weinstock argues for the existence of a little-acknowledged feminist tradition of nineteenth- and early twentieth-century American women writing ghost stories to contest various forms of legal and social oppression. Among the authors addressed in this study are Harriet Beecher Stowe, Edith Wharton, Alice Cary, Mary Austin, Mary E. Wilkins Freeman, Charlotte Perkins Gilman, and Harriet Prescott Spofford.

=== Vampires ===
Weinstock is perhaps best known for his 2012 work, The Vampire Film: Undead Cinema, which surveys the history of the vampire in film and addresses their persistent popularity in relation to the themes of sex, technology, and race. In the introduction to this book, indebted to the work of Jeffrey Jerome Cohen and Henry Jenkins III, he asserts seven principles governing the cinematic representation of vampires:

1. The cinematic vampire is always about sex
2. The vampire is always more interesting than those who pursue it
3. The vampire always returns
4. The cinematic vampire is an overdetermined body condensing what a culture considers "other"
5. The cinematic vampire is always about technology
6. The vampire film genre does not exist
7. We are all vampire textual nomads

The Vampire: Undead Cinema was the winner of the 2013 International Association of the Fantastic in the Arts Lord Ruthven Assembly Award for Best Nonfiction Title.

Weinstock has focused on the popularity and importance of vampires in twentieth and twenty-first century culture in a number of articles and book chapters, including a chapter on American Vampires in the Edinburgh Companion to the American Gothic.

=== The Gothic ===
Weinstock's interests in monsters, ghosts, and vampires are specific manifestations of his broader interest in the American Gothic tradition—an interest that runs throughout his body of work and is reflected by his research on Edgar Allan Poe, H. P. Lovecraft, Stephen King, and Toni Morrison, among others. Of note in this respect is his 2011 monograph on American Charles Brockden Brown arguing for the late eighteenth-century author's centrality in establishing American variants of four Gothic subgenres: the frontier Gothic, the urban Gothic, the psychological Gothic, and the female Gothic. In 2017, Weinstock published The Cambridge Companion to the American Gothic.

== Cult film and television ==
Weinstock has also published research on cult film and television, including both a monograph and an edited collection on The Rocky Horror Picture Show, edited collections on directors Tim Burton and M. Night Shyamalan, edited collections on Twin Peaks and the film The Blair Witch Project, and articles and essays on films including The Evil Dead and Bubba Ho-tep. Weinstock's 2007 book, The Rocky Horror Picture Show, one of the first three titles published as part of the now well-established "Cultographies" series from Wallflower Press (now an imprint of Columbia University Press), offers a survey of the film's history, considers its sexual politics, examines its interweaving of references to other cinematic texts, and theorizes the audience's famous response as a vacillation between empathic and ironic behavior.

== Popular culture ==
Weinstock's research often seeks to theorize contemporary popular culture. Tangential to his emphasis on the Gothic, he edited a 2008 collection for SUNY Press on the animated program South Park.

In 2018, Weinstock published Critical Approaches to Welcome to Night Vale: Podcasting Between Weather and the Void, a collection of scholarly essays devoted to the popular podcast, Welcome to Night Vale. The book is the first scholarly book publication related to a particular podcast.

In 2020, he and Kate Egan of Northumbria University published the co-edited volume And Now For Something Completely Different: Critical Approaches to Monty Python. Weinstock’s own contribution focuses on the cultic qualities of Monty Python and the Holy Grail.

== Weird fiction ==
Together with Carl Sederholm of Brigham Young University, Weinstock edited a 2016 scholarly collection on American author of weird fiction, H. P. Lovecraft. Weinstock's own chapter contribution to the volume, "Lovecraft's Things", utilizes the insights of contemporary object-oriented ontology to consider the roles of material objects in Lovecraft's fiction. The collection received the 2016 Ray & Pat Browne Award for Best Edited Collection in Popular Culture and American Culture. Weinstock had previously edited three volumes of the fiction of H. P. Lovecraft for Barnes & Noble.

== Pedagogy ==
Weinstock has expressed an interest through his career in pedagogy in general, and ways to teach the Gothic in particular. His 2003 edited collection, The Pedagogical Wallpaper: Teaching Charlotte Perkin's Gilman's "The Yellow Wall-paper," addressed approaches to using Gilman's short story as a tool for teaching in the classroom. This collection became the subject of a round-table discussion in the Spring 2004 issue of the journal Pedagogy. In 2009, as part of the Modern Language Association's "Approaches to Teaching World Literature" series, Weinstock co-edited the volume Approaches to Teaching Poe's Prose and Poetry with Anthony Magistrale of the University of Vermont. His own contribution focuses on Poe's only novel, The Narrative of Arthur Gordon Pym of Nantucket, and charges of plagiarism surrounding it.

Weinstock’s interest in pedagogy has extended to publishing two textbooks: The Mad Scientist’s Guide to Composition (A Somewhat Cheeky but Exceedingly Useful Introduction to Academic Writing) (2020) and Pop Culture for Beginners (2021).

== Music ==
An extension of Weinstock's interest in the Gothic, as well as a channeling of his interest in goth, industrial, and experimental electronic music, and his more than 25 years as a DJ of these genres, Goth Music: From Sound to Subculture is a study authored by Weinstock with musicologist Isabella van Elferen of Kingston University, London. Making use of the theories of Bruno Latour and M. M. Bakhtin, Van Elferen and Weinstock assert in this book that the diversity of styles encompassed by the generic rubric goth find their consistency through shared chronotopes—aural time-spaces that serve as the settings for shared fantasy narratives.

== Publications ==
- Weinstock, Jeffrey Andrew (2003). The Pedagogical Wallpaper: Teaching Charlotte Perkins Gilman's "The Yellow Wall-paper." New York: Peter Lang Publishers. ISBN 978-0820463056
- Weinstock, Jeffrey Andrew (ed. with Sarah Higley) (2004). Nothing That Is: Millennial Cinema and the Blair Witch Controversies. Detroit: Wayne State University Press. ISBN 978-0814330647
- Weinstock, Jeffrey Andrew (2004). Spectral America: Phantoms and the National Imagination. Madison: University of Wisconsin Press. ISBN 978-0299199548
- Weinstock, Jeffrey Andrew (2007). The Rocky Horror Picture Show. London: Wallflower Press. ISBN 978-1905674503
- Weinstock, Jeffrey Andrew (2008). Scare Tactics: Supernatural Fiction by American Women. New York: Fordham University Press. ISBN 978-0823271887
- Weinstock, Jeffrey Andrew (2008). Taking South Park Seriously. New York: SUNY Press. ISBN 978-0791475669
- Weinstock, Jeffrey Andrew (2008). Reading Rocky: The Rocky Horror Picture Show and Popular Culture. New York: Palgrave. ISBN 978-1137525031
- Weinstock, Jeffrey Andrew (ed. with Anthony Magistrale) (2009). Approaches to Teaching Poe's Prose and Poetry. New York: MLA. ISBN 978-1603290128
- Weinstock, Jeffrey Andrew (2010). Critical Approaches to the Films of M. Night Shyamalan: Spoiler Warnings. New York: Palgrave. ISBN 978-0230104082
- Weinstock, Jeffrey Andrew (2011). Charles Brockden Brown. Cardiff: University of Wales Press. ISBN 978-0708324196
- Weinstock, Jeffrey Andrew (2012). The Vampire Film: Undead Cinema. New York: Columbia University Press. ISBN 978-0121818807
- Weinstock, Jeffrey Andrew (2013). The Works of Tim Burton: Margins to Mainstream. New York: Palgrave. ISBN 978-1137370822
- Weinstock, Jeffrey Andrew (2014). The Ashgate Encyclopedia of Literary and Cinematic Monsters. Farnham, UK: Ashgate. ISBN 978-1409425625
- Weinstock, Jeffrey Andrew (ed. with Catherine Spooner) (2016). Return to Twin Peaks: New Approaches to Materiality, Theory, and Genre on Television. New York: Palgrave. ISBN 978-1137563842
- Weinstock, Jeffrey Andrew (authored with Isabella van Elferen) (2016). Goth Music: From Sound to Subculture. London: Routledge. ISBN 978-0415720045
- Weinstock, Jeffrey Andrew (ed. with Carl Sederholm) (2016). The Age of Lovecraft. Minneapolis: University of Minnesota Press. ISBN 978-0816699254
- Weinstock, Jeffrey Andrew (2018). The Cambridge Companion to the American Gothic. New York and London: Cambridge University Press. ISBN 978-1107539785
- Weinstock, Jeffrey Andrew (2018). Critical Approaches to Welcome to Night Vale: Podcasting Between Weather and the Void. New York: Palgrave. ISBN 978-3-319-93090-9
- Weinstock, Jeffrey Andrew (2020). The Mad Scientist's Guide to Composition. Canada: Broadview Press. ISBN 9781554814459
- Weinstock, Jeffrey Andrew (2020). The Monster Theory Reader. Minneapolis: University of Minnesota Press. ISBN 978-1-5179-0524-8
- Weinstock, Jeffrey Andrew (ed. with Kate Egan) (2020). And Now for Something Completely Different: Critical Approaches to Monty Python. Edinburgh: University of Edinburgh Press. ISBN 978-1474475167
- Weinstock, Jeffrey Andrew (ed. with Regina Hansen) (2021). Giving the Devil His Due: Satan and Cinema. New York: Fordham University Press. ISBN 978-0823297900
- Weinstock, Jeffrey Andrew (2022). Pop Culture for Beginners. Ontario: Broadview Press. ISBN 978-1554815654
- Weinstock, Jeffrey Andrew (2022). A Critical Companion to Neil Gaiman’s “Neverwhere.” New York: Palgrave. ISBN 978-3030964573
- Weinstock, Jeffrey Andrew (2023). Monstrous Things: Selected Essays on Ghosts, Vampires & Things That Go Bump in the Night. Jefferson, NC: McFarland. ISBN 978-1476688299
- Weinstock, Jeffrey Andrew (2023). Gothic Things: Dark Enchantment and Anthropocene Anxiety. New York: Fordham University Press. ISBN 978-1531503420
- Weinstock, Jeffrey Andrew (ed. with Lorna Piatti-Farnell) (2024). Gothic Disney: Dark Shadows in the House of Mouse. Lanham, MD: Lexington Books. ISBN 978-1666907209
- Weinstock, Jeffrey Andrew (ed. with Monika Elbert) (2024). Gothic Melville. Wales: University of Wales Press. ISBN 978-1837721474
- Weinstock, Jeffrey Andrew and Scott Brewster (2024). The Routledge Introduction to the American Ghost Story. London: Routledge. ISBN 978-0367461157
