= Marjorine =

- South Park episode
- Episode no.: Season 9 Episode 9
- Directed by: Trey Parker
- Written by: Trey Parker
- Production code: 909
- Original air date: October 26, 2005

Episode chronology
← Previous "Two Days Before the Day After Tomorrow"	Next → "Follow That Egg!"
- South Park season 9

"Marjorine" is the ninth episode in the ninth season of the American animated television series South Park. The 134th episode of the series overall, it originally aired on Comedy Central in the United States on October 26, 2005.

== Plot ==
Cartman gathers the boys together in his basement to show them a videotape of the girls of South Park Elementary using a device, which he believes is a high-tech gadget that gives them the ability to see into the future (in reality, it is a paper fortune teller).

The boys build a containment center to study the device, and devise a plan to steal it. The boys fake Butters' death by dropping a pig cadaver dressed as him from the Bowery Building. Stephen and Linda Stotch are devastated at the apparent death of their son and the funeral is held a few days later.

Butters then dresses up as a new girl, "Marjorine", and infiltrates a slumber party hosted by classmate Heidi Turner, in an attempt to retrieve the device. At first the girls are cold and hostile towards "Marjorine" and consistently make fun of her until Butters takes the insults seriously and winds up crying in the bathroom, at which point the rest of the girls apologize and offer a makeover.

Meanwhile, Linda is still distraught and heartbroken by the loss of her son, and Stephen is deeply troubled by her sorrow, also missing Butters. Unprompted, he is told by an old farmer (based on the character Judd Crandall from Pet Sematary) not to dig up Butters' body and re-bury him at the Indian burial ground. Stephen—who had no intention of doing such a thing until the old man put the notion in his head—exhumes Butters' "remains" and reburies the pig carcass at the Indian burial ground, believing this will bring Butters back to life.

Butters (as Marjorine) is just starting to have fun after being made over and is now dancing with the girls when Cartman, enraged, calls him and tells him to get on with stealing the device. Heidi's father realizes that there are boys around the house. Butters believes his cover is blown and makes a desperate escape with the fortune-telling device and gives it to the other boys. Stan tells Butters to come along to learn about the device, but he refuses, saying that the device is nothing but trouble and his job is done and goes home to tell his parents that he is not dead. When the boys attempt to ask so many questions with the device, Stan realizes what Butters has meant. The boys, this time around, decide that the power of the fortune-telling device is too great for any mortal. Rather than spending their lives defending it from girls, the CIA, terrorists and the Russians, they decide to destroy it by having Kenny blow it up (with enough force that it completely incinerates all the trees in the surrounding forest and is visible from space, to which Cartman merely responds "Damn, Ken.")

Meanwhile, Butters' parents have now convinced themselves that their child will return as a demon. Butters knocks on the door but they do not want to see him back from the dead, in a reference to "The Monkey's Paw". Butters returns home to his terrified parents who lock him in the basement and chain him up. When he says he is hungry, his father wallops a saleswoman with a shovel in front of him and offers up her corpse to feed on, still believing Butters to be a zombie. The episode ends with Butters asking for SpaghettiOs instead.

== Production ==
On the DVD commentary, Trey Parker and Matt Stone reveal that they find this episode unbearable to watch, mainly because they felt that there were too many ideas packed into one episode. They wished that they split the stories into two episodes and felt that the episode served as a reminder to keep future episodes simple.
