= South Park and Philosophy: Bigger, Longer, and More Penetrating =

2007 book edited by Richard Hanley

- Cover, 2007 ed.
- Author: Richard Hanley, editor
- Language: English
- Series: Pop Culture and Philosophy Series
- Subject: Philosophy, Popular culture
- Genre: Non-fiction
- Publisher: Open Court
- Publication date: March 8, 2007
- Publication place: United States
- Media type: Paperback
- Pages: 288
- ISBN: 0-8126-9613-1
- OCLC: 79256768

South Park and Philosophy: Bigger, Longer, and More Penetrating is a non-fiction book analyzing the philosophy and popular culture effects of South Park, published by Open Court. The book is edited by Richard Hanley.

In an interview about the book, Richard Hanley explained why he chose the topic of South Park for philosophical analysis: "South Park is like the Simpsons, but with a lot less restrictions, and almost every episode pushes the envelope." In addition to editing the work, Hanley also wrote fourteen out of the twenty-two essays in the book.

The title is an allusion to the film South Park: Bigger, Longer & Uncut. Both titles are also double entendres that can also refer to a penis.

== Synopsis ==
The book includes an article about the character Kenny, by Southern Illinois University philosophy professor Dr. Randall Auxier, entitled: "Killing Kenny: Our Daily Dose of Death". Professor Auxier also gave a talk on his contribution to the work, at Green Mountain College. South Park and Philosophy: Bigger, Longer, and More Penetrating also addresses issues of applied ethics, such as stem-cell research, euthanasia, drugs in sports, religion, blasphemy, human evolution, environment, and gay marriage. The book is organized into five sections by topic, which include "Religion and Other Disabilities", "Politics and Other Sacred Cows", "Morality and Other Urges", "Science, Logic and Other Really, Really Clever Stuff" and "Humor and Other Insertable Devices".

== Reception ==
Jerry Rhodes noted in an interview published in the University of Delaware's UDaily that Hanley's work celebrates the ability of South Park to confront issues that make most viewers uncomfortable. Victor Greto wrote in The News Journal, that though some of the humor in the book "falls flat", most readers will laugh out loud, but also squirm a bit. Greto went on to note the book's proclivity towards certain racial epithets and language, as well as a critique of religion. Religions analyzed in the work include Scientology and the Xenu mythology, as presented in the South Park episode, Trapped in the Closet, which Hanley discusses in comparison to elements of Christianity and the virgin birth.
