= Robert Arp =

American philosopher (born 1970)

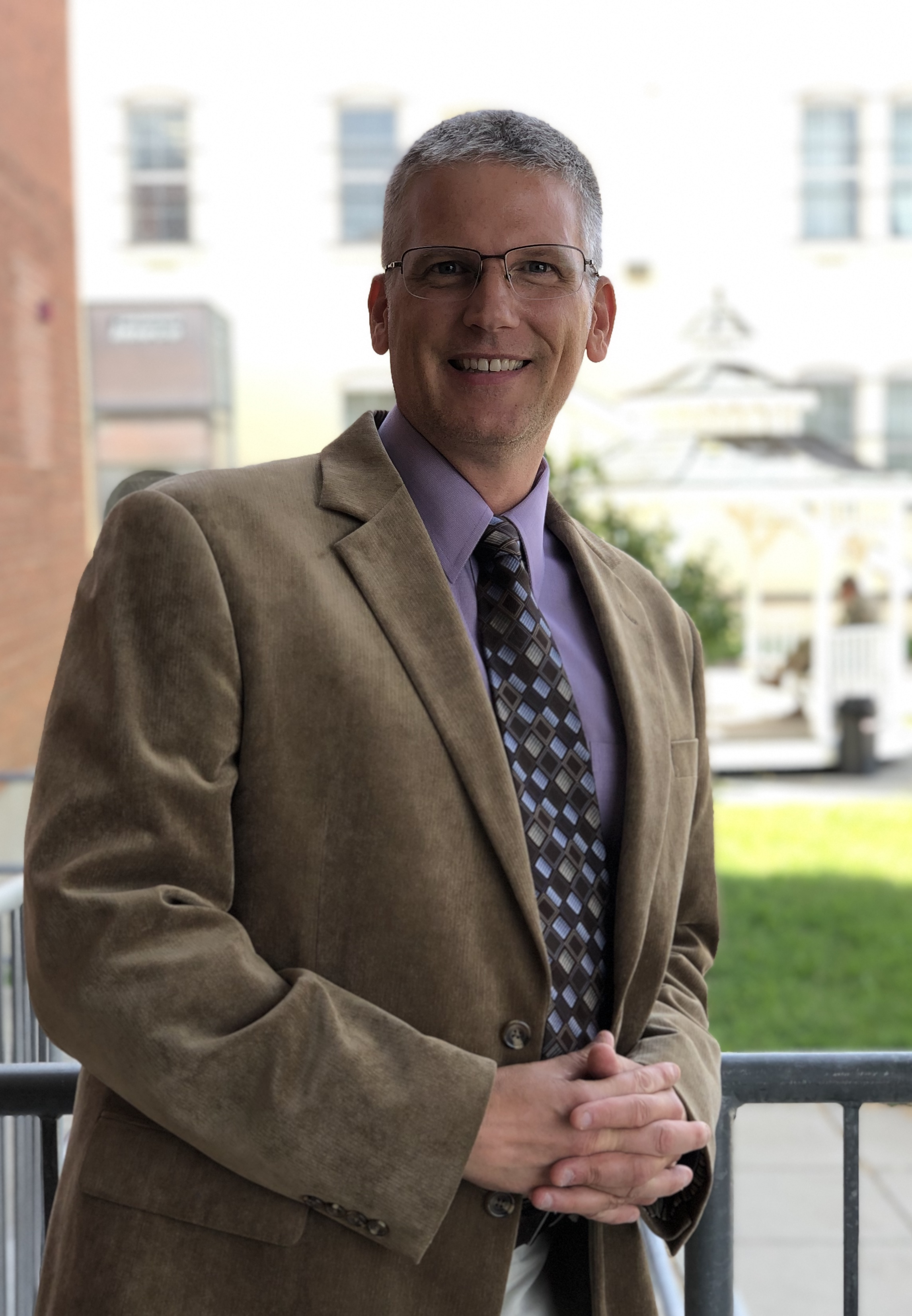
- Arp in September 2019
- Born: March 20, 1970 (age 56); Chicago, Illinois, US
- Occupations: Philosopher, writer

Philosophical work
- Main interests: Modern philosophy Ethics; Ontology; Philosophy of biology Cognitive science Evolutionary psychology Religious studies

Robert Arp (born March 20, 1970) is an American philosopher known for his work in ethics, modern philosophy, ontology, philosophy of biology, cognitive science, evolutionary psychology, religious studies, and philosophy and popular culture. He currently works as an adjunct professor teaching philosophy courses in the classroom and online at numerous schools in the Kansas City, Missouri area and other areas of the United States.

== Education ==
Arp completed his undergraduate degree in philosophy at The Catholic University of America (CUA) in 1992, his master's degree in philosophy at CUA in 1993, and PhD in philosophy at Saint Louis University (SLU) during the 2004–2005 school year. He was awarded a prestigious Theodore B. Basselin Scholarship while at CUA, and was a teaching fellow, research fellow, and dissertation fellow during his time at SLU. Arp taught as an assistant professor of philosophy at Southwest Minnesota State University (2005–2006) and then as a Visiting assistant professor of philosophy at Florida State University for a year with Michael Ruse (2006–2007), as well as at many schools in the St. Louis, Missouri area as an adjunct professor of philosophy (1996–2005), before doing postdoctoral research in ontology through the National Center for Biomedical Ontology with Mark Musen and Barry Smith at the University at Buffalo (2007–2009).

== Work in ethics ==
Arp's paper in International Philosophical Quarterly titled "Vindicating Kant's Morality" offers a defense of Immanuel Kant's position against those who would claim that Kant's moral position lacks a motivational component, ignores the spiritual dimensions of morality espoused by a virtue-based ethics, overemphasizes the principle of autonomy in neglecting the communal context of morality, and lacks a theological foundation.

With Arthur Caplan, Arp edited Contemporary Debates in Bioethics through John Wiley & Sons, containing new papers written by experts in bioethics and applied ethics such as Don Marquis, Tom Beauchamp, Mark Cherry, William J. Winslade, Jane Maienschein, Edwin Black, Richard Arneson, and others.

== Work in philosophy of biology ==
Concerning biological function, Arp has put forward a middle position between the two viable accounts of function today—namely, the organizational account of function (usually attributed to Robert Cummins) and the modern history account of function (usually attributed to Paul Griffiths and Peter Godfrey-Smith)—and his position has been called "reconciliatory" and "pluralist." His article with Barry Smith titled "Function, role and disposition in basic formal ontology" published in Nature Precedings has been cited more than 140 times, according to Google Scholar.

Besides his work in functions and teleology, Arp has attempted a definition of life, arguing that the "components and attending processes of an organism must be considered as living, emergent phenomena because of the way in which the components are organized to maintain homeostasis of the organism at the various levels in the organismic hierarchy." He calls this position the homeostatic organization view of biological phenomena. With Alexander Rosenberg, Arp has edited Philosophy of Biology: An Anthology (Wiley-Blackwell, 2009), with Francisco J. Ayala, he has edited Contemporary Debates in Philosophy of Biology (Wiley-Blackwell, 2009), and with George Terzis, he has edited Information and Living Systems: Philosophical and Scientific Perspectives (MIT Press, 2011).

Arp has also offered suggestions for the interactions of philosophers and scientists as they go about their work in philosophy of science.

== Work in cognitive science and evolutionary psychology ==
In his first book published through MIT Press, Scenario Visualization: An Evolutionary Account of Creative Problem Solving, Arp adds to Steven Mithen's cognitive fluidity view by arguing that such fluidity would be random and chaotic without mechanisms of selection and integration. Thus, what he calls "scenario visualization" is a necessary ingredient in creative problem solving, and likely was one of the first things that emerged in human consciousness. Scenario visualization is defined by Arp as a "conscious ability to segregate and integrate visual images in future scenarios."

While this view has been applauded as "innovative and interesting," a "valuable resource and a stimulating contribution," and even "ambitious," there are those who critique Arp's position as "saying nothing new" and suffering from "a form of selectivity deficit – an inability to judge what is and isn't relevant to his claims."

Arp's view continues to be referred to as plausible by cognitive scientists and others doing work in artificial intelligence, philosophical psychology, and other areas of study.

== Work in ontology ==
Arp has worked as an ontologist with the CGI Group and BAE Systems on projects for the United States Air Force, National Institutes of Health, and United States Army. He has published papers dealing with philosophy of science and conceptual models and produced numerous technical documents as a technical writer. Arp has also used RDF, RDFS, OWL, and SPARQL to assist in building ontologies for the Next Generation Air Transportation System, making use of ontology-building tools such as TopBraid and Protégé. He was part of the initial steps in developing the world's first weather ontology with other ontologists at Lincoln Laboratory. He was also part of the genesis of the Infectious Disease Ontology through meetings and discussions in 2007 and 2008. The Infectious Disease Ontology is one of the ontologies in the Open Biological and Biomedical Ontologies Foundry, also known as the OBO Foundry.

As a theoretical ontologist, having worked closely with Barry Smith (also a philosopher/ontologist), Arp has contributed to Smith's Basic Formal Ontology in the areas of function, role, and disposition. Arp's book with Smith and Andrew Spear published in 2015 through MIT Press, Building Ontologies with Basic Formal Ontology, has been cited more than 1300 times on Google Scholar as of 1 July 2024. Within the context of Basic Formal Ontology, biology, and bioinformatics, although Arp's definition of function has been criticized as inapplicable to "entities above or below a certain size," the definition not only offers an attempt at a "coherence between the concepts of biological function and technical function," but it also has been used by researchers doing work in biochemical processes, hypersensitivity conditions, service systems, and domain conceptual modeling in general.

Like Barry Smith, Arp also has sought to defend a common sense realist position concerning the construction of domain ontologies (essentially, scientific realism) whereby a domain ontology should, if possible and appropriate, represent the actual entities out there in the world that fall under the purview of science. One argument Arp puts forward is a restatement of the "no-miracles argument" for scientific realism which states that it would be miraculous if scientific theories were not at least approximately true descriptions of the world, since they are so (seemingly) successful at prediction and control. He has argued for this position in the past.

However, cognizant of the difficulties surrounding a realist position (especially for practical, working ontologists), Arp has argued for a form of as-if philosophical realism, along the lines of Immanuel Kant and Hans Vaihinger whereby the "commitment to the pursuit of abstract objects could become instrumental in guiding the life of philosophy and science in a limited as if manner."

Just as Kant spoke of the value of the regulative ideas as aiding in, not only the rounding off of our systematic picture of reality, but also prompting us to do further research and investigation, so too, according to Arp thinkers are to act as if there is a reality "out there" (the ding-an-sich or noumenon, as it were) when they construct domain ontologies or engage in any other kind of scientific endeavor. Given the as-if nature of this position, similar to that of Hans Vaihinger, there is always the possibility that there may be practical or pragmatic concerns in building domain ontologies which actually trump the realist pursuit, and Arp is mindful of this possibility.

Also, following other ontologists he has drawn a distinction between philosophical ontology (physical ontology), domain ontology, and upper ontology (also known as top-level or formal) ontology, and has attempted to articulate principles for best practices in the building of domain ontologies in radiology, cell signaling, bioethics, and finance.

== Work in religious studies ==
Arp has added to the discussion concerning the issue of classifying mystical union with the One in the Neoplatonism of Plotinus, a topic in mysticism with a crossover in religious experience and spirituality more generally. In contradistinction to the theistic union view (where the soul retains its identity in union with the One) on one hand, and the monistic identity view (where the soul loses its identity in union with the One) on the other, Arp has argued in a much-cited paper titled "Plotinus, Mysticism, and Mediation" in the prestigious journal Religious Studies for what he calls a "mediated union" position in the doctrines of Plotinus where the noetic part of the soul is not fully transcended in union with the One.

Arp also has published on mystics such as Lydwina of Schiedam, Margaret of Castello, Saint Benedict Joseph Labre, Saint Rita of Cascia, and others who claim that God's goodness and love can be experienced through, or in the midst of, pain and suffering. Drawing on the work of Simone Weil and Diogenes Allen, he offers a unique theodicy as a response to the problem of evil in his paper titled "Suffering as Theodicy" from the journal Cahiers Simone Weil.

Borrowing the concept of solidarity as used by the famous environmental ethicist Robin Attfield in his view known as biocentric consequentialism, Arp has sought to establish a Ubiquitous Ethical Principle of Solidarity. Deriving its modern usage from the French solidarité meaning "communion of interests and responsibilities" or "mutual responsibility," the concept of solidarity was championed by Émile Durkheim in his De la division du travail social: étude sur l'organisation des sociétés supérieures (The Division of Labor in Society, 1893). There, Durkheim envisions solidarité as a kind of human fraternity dependent upon the existence of personal bonds, which are needed for the realization of common goals or ideals within groups. Unlike justice, which tends to focus on rules and principles without specific references to personal bonds, solidarity requires an acknowledgement of subjective ties; it involves a degree of sentiment de camaraderie, or fellow feeling, which is shared by subjects within or between groups. Durkheim was part of numerous Judeo-Christian ethical and political systems that responded to the Industrial Revolution at the close of the 19th century. Arp tries to extend Attfield's notion of solidarity and show how, in addition to the Judeo-Christian tradition, solidarity as an ethical principle may be found in Hinduism, Buddhism, Jainism, Confucianism, Daoism, Islam, as well as in certain traditional African religions, and Native American religions and among the religions of Indigenous Australians. It is through the ubiquitousness of solidarity, then, that issues having to do with local, national, and global forms of environmental justice (for example, poverty, human rights deprivation, environmental racism) may be confronted. Religious beliefs are part of the very fabric of human existence, so if a religious-based ethical sentiment can be harnessed—as one finds in solidarity—and used as a motivator for confronting environmental injustice, then it is more likely to be enduring. So claims Arp.

== Work in philosophy and popular culture ==
Arp has chapters in more than 40 books in the genre known colloquially as Philosophy and Popular Culture, including Metallica and Philosophy, Family Guy and Philosophy, Lost and Philosophy, 24 and Philosophy, The Office and Philosophy, Battlestar Galactica and Philosophy, Watchmen and Philosophy, Final Fantasy and Philosophy, Alice in Wonderland and Philosophy, True Blood and Philosophy, 30 Rock and Philosophy, and others. He has worked numerous times with William Irwin, General Editor of The Blackwell Philosophy and Pop Culture series through Wiley-Blackwell (publisher). In 2006 Arp edited the flagship book in that series, South Park and Philosophy: You Know, I Learned Something Today, which has been translated into Italian, Turkish, and Portuguese.

He also co-edited Batman and Philosophy: The Dark Knight of the Soul with Mark White, soon to be translated into the German language. Arp and White were interviewed in 2008 by The Boston Globe and, when asked by The Globe, "Do some scholars see this kind of thing (i.e., Philosophy and Popular Culture books) as silly?" part of Arp's response was: "At root we are trying to bring philosophy to people and bring people to philosophy." Arp and White also contributed an article to The Globe called "Should Batman Kill the Joker?" in 2008. This article is reprinted in the eighth edition of The Norton Sampler: Short Essays for Composition (in Chapter 12: Argument), published by W. W. Norton & Company.

Arp has also worked with Mark Conard and The Philosophy of Popular Culture series through The University Press of Kentucky, as well as with David Ramsay Steele and the Popular Culture and Philosophy series through Open Court Publishing Company, which has produced titles such as The Simpsons and Philosophy: The D'oh! of Homer, Star Wars and Philosophy, Star Trek and Philosophy, The Beatles and Philosophy, James Bond and Philosophy, and many others. One of Arp's latest projects is as editor of Tattoos – Philosophy for Everyone: I Ink, Therefore I Am with Fritz Allhoff (General Editor of the Philosophy for Everyone series) and Wiley-Blackwell Publishers.

Arp was Plenary Speaker for Pop Culture and Philosophy Conferences at Eastern Washington University (2010) and Georgia Southern University (2013).

Arp's edited book, 1001 Ideas That Changed the Way We Think, was published through Simon & Schuster in 2013 and has sold thousands of copies worldwide in English, French, German, Italian, Portuguese, Czech and Slovak. Concerning reviews of the book, The Boston Globe stated, "Editor Robert Arp has produced a reference guide that's fun to browse," while Library Journal claims the book is "highly attractive... recommended" and Booklist notes that it is "entertaining and informative."

In September 2015, Arp was interviewed by Ed Berliner on his show, The Hard Line with Ed Berliner, through Newsmax TV about South Park (season 19).

On January 22, 2019, Arp appeared with other philosophers on the podcast devoted to philosophy and popular culture titled, I Think, Therefore, I Fan.
