= Richard Hanley =

Zambian-born Australian philosopher

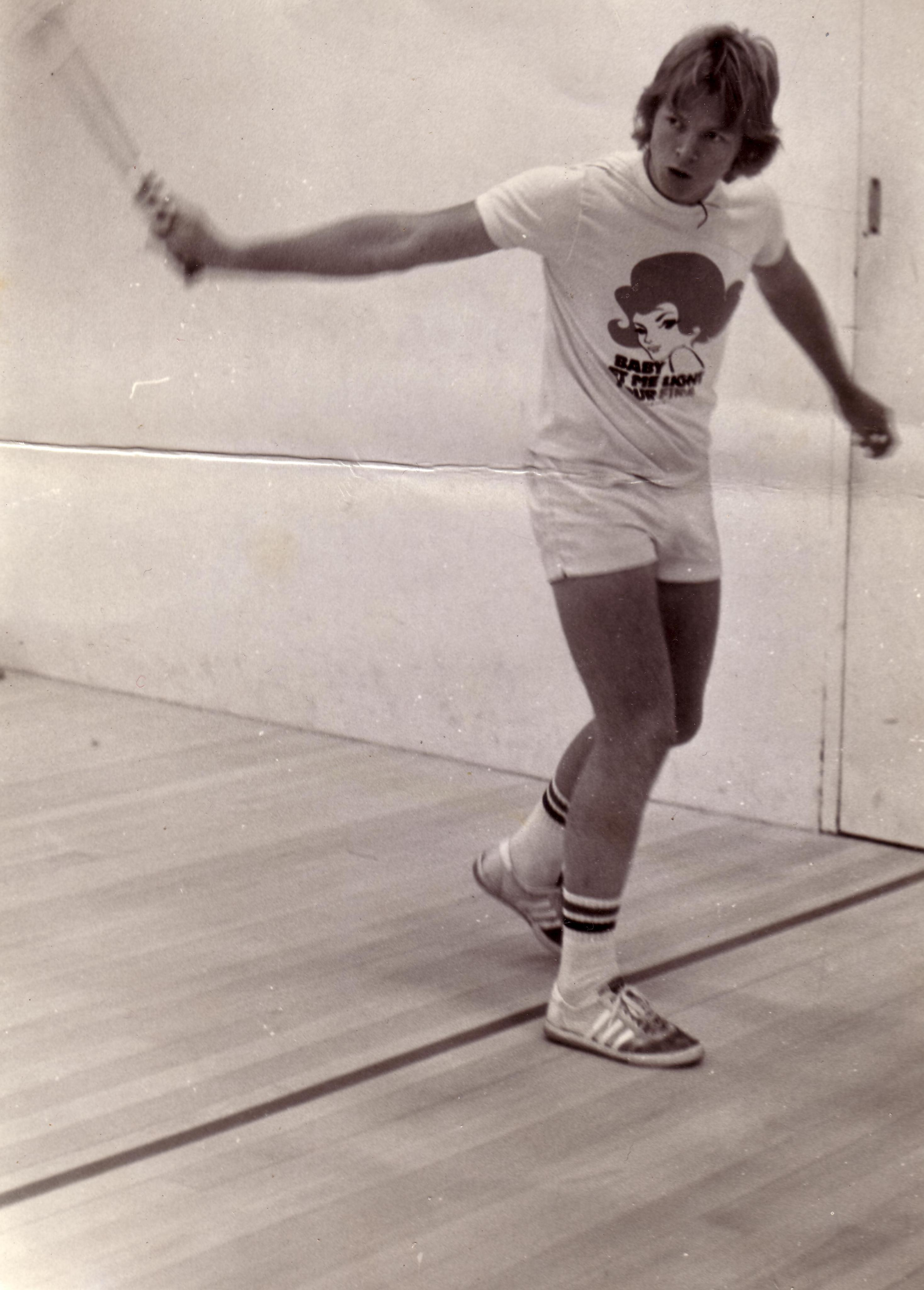
1977

Richard Hanley is a Zambian-born Australian philosopher.

== Life ==
Richard Hanley, also known as "Hypertime Hanley", was born in Zambia and later moved to Australia as a small child. He studied at the University of Sydney, and completed his PhD at University of Maryland. He is now an associate professor of philosophy at the University of Delaware. Philosophically, he is a perdurantist following in the footsteps of David Lewis. Hanley believes that time travel is logically, physically, and epistemically possible. He was also on the TV show "Sale of the Century."

== Writings ==
Hanley coauthored the Blackwell Guide to the Philosophy of Language (ISBN 0-6312-3142-0)

He has written on philosophy in fiction. He is the author of the book, Is Data Human? The Metaphysics of Star Trek (ISBN 0-465-09124-5), which explores a number of philosophical questions raised by various episodes of Star Trek: The Next Generation, Star Trek: Deep Space Nine, and Star Trek: Voyager, such as whether Data is human, and whether a character called Tuvix, temporarily formed by the characters Tuvok and Neelix being beamed into a single body, was a separate being entitled to its own existence. The hardcover edition of the book was titled only The Metaphysics of Star Trek.

Hanley is frequently critical of the Star Trek writers' sophistication in treating philosophical issues, but nevertheless praises Star Trek for its willingness to frequently raise questions of philosophical significance.

He is the editor of the book South Park and Philosophy: Bigger, Longer, and More Penetrating (ISBN 0-8126-9613-1), released 28 March 2007, as well as the author of many of the essays within.
