= South Park (franchise) =

American comedy franchise

- Created by: Trey Parker; Matt Stone
- Original work: The Spirit of Christmas (1992–1995)
- Owners: South Park Digital Studios (Skydance and Park County)
- Years: 1992–present

Films and television
- Film: South Park: Bigger, Longer & Uncut (1999)
- Short films: The Spirit of Christmas (1992–1995); Short films and sketches
- Animated series: South Park (1997–present)
- Television special: Paramount+ specials
- Direct-to-video: Imaginationland: The Movie (2008)

Games
- Video games: List of video games

Audio
- Soundtracks: Chef Aid: The South Park Album; South Park: Bigger, Longer & Uncut; Mr. Hankey's Christmas Classics

Official website
- https://www.southparkstudios.com/

South Park is an American multimedia franchise created by Trey Parker and Matt Stone. It includes the television series of the same name, developed by Brian Graden for Comedy Central, as well as video games, music videos, and short films that expand the universe. The South Park franchise is primarily set in the fictional titular Colorado town.

Prior to the television series, Parker and Stone released two shorts, both known as The Spirit of Christmas, which would go on to form the basis of the series and franchise. Besides the namesake show, the franchise includes several video games, music videos, a compilation album, various short films and an ongoing series of TV specials and movies created for exclusive release on Paramount+.

== Television series ==
South Park is an American animated sitcom created by Trey Parker and Matt Stone, and developed by Brian Graden for the Comedy Central television network. The show revolves around four boys—Stan Marsh, Kyle Broflovski, Eric Cartman, and Kenny McCormick—and their bizarre adventures in and around the titular Colorado town. Much like The Simpsons, South Park uses a very large ensemble cast of recurring characters and became infamous for its profanity and dark, surreal humor that satirizes a wide range of topics towards a mature audience.

The pilot episode was produced using cutout animation, leading to all subsequent episodes being produced with computer animation that emulated the cutout technique. Parker and Stone perform most of the voice acting for the show's male characters. Since 2000, each episode has typically been written and produced in the week preceding its broadcast, with Parker serving as the primary writer and director. There have been a total of 342 episodes over the course of the show's 29 seasons.

== Other media ==
=== Theatrical film ===
In June 1999, less than two years after the series first aired, a feature-length film was released domestically by Paramount Pictures, with Warner Bros. handling international distribution. The film, a musical comedy, was directed by Parker, who co-wrote the script with Stone and Pam Brady. The film was generally well received by critics, and earned a combined US$83.1 million at the domestic and foreign box office. The film satirizes the controversy surrounding the show itself and gained a spot in the 2001 edition of Guinness World Records for "Most Swearing in an Animated Film". The song "Blame Canada" from the film's soundtrack earned song co-writers Parker and Marc Shaiman an Academy Award nomination for Best Music, Original Song.

Imaginationland: The Movie was released direct-to-video in 2008 and features the three episodes from the 11th season (Imaginationland I, Imaginationland II, and Imaginationland III) merged into a compilation film.

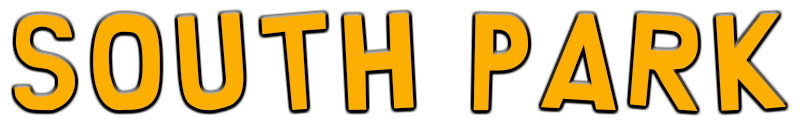
Secondary logo used when the sign logo is not used.

Parker and Stone said in a 2008 interview that a theatrically released sequel would most likely be what concludes the series. In 2011, when asked on the official South Park website whether a sequel would be made, they said "the first South Park movie was so potent, we're all still recovering from the blow. Unfortunately, at the current moment, there are no plans for a second South Park movie. But you never know what the future may bring, crazier things have happened..." In 2011, Time called South Park: Bigger, Longer & Uncut the sixth greatest animated feature of all time. In 2013, Warner Bros. relinquished to Paramount its rights to co-finance a potential future South Park film during their negotiations to co-finance the Christopher Nolan science fiction film Interstellar. Previous efforts to create a second South Park film were complicated due to both studios retaining certain rights to the property.

=== Paramount+ specials ===
On August 5, 2021, it was announced that 14 new original movies based on the series were green-lit at Paramount+, with two new movies being released yearly starting in 2021. Parker and Stone would later state that the projects would not be feature films, and that it was ViacomCBS who decided to advertise them as movies. Subsequent advertising and branding in press releases from Paramount+ frequently use the term "exclusive event" instead, indicating that these are more properly classified as television specials.

=== Shorts and sketches ===
As a tribute to the Dead Parrot sketch, a short that features Cartman attempting to return a dead Kenny to a shop run by Kyle aired during a 1999 BBC television special commemorating the 30th anniversary of Monty Python's Flying Circus. South Park parodied Scientology in a short that aired as part of the 2000 MTV Movie Awards. The short was entitled "The Gauntlet" and also poked fun at John Travolta, a Scientologist. The four main characters were featured in the documentary film The Aristocrats, listening to Cartman tell his version of the film's titular joke. Short clips of Cartman introducing the starting lineup for the University of Colorado (Parker and Stone's alma mater) football team were featured during ABC's coverage of the 2007 matchup between the University of Colorado and the University of Nebraska. In 2008, Parker, as Cartman, gave answers to a Proust Questionnaire conducted by Julie Rovner of NPR. The Snakes & Arrows Tour for Rush in 2007 used an intro from Cartman, Stan, Kyle, and Kenny preceding "Tom Sawyer". As Parker, Stone and producer Frank Agnone are Los Angeles Kings fans, special South Park pre-game videos have been featured at Kings home games at Staples Center, and the club even sent the Stanley Cup to visit South Park Studios after winning the 2012 Stanley Cup Final. Parker and Stone have also created Denver Broncos and Denver Nuggets-themed shorts, featuring Cartman, for home games at Pepsi Center.

Title	Release date	Availability	Summary
The Spirit of Christmas: "Jesus vs. Frosty"	December 8, 1992	N/A	The idea for South Park originated in 1992 when Trey Parker and Matt Stone, students at the University of Colorado, met in a film class. The two created a low-budget, crudely made, Christmas-related animated short, often called "Jesus vs. Frosty". The film featured prototypes of the main characters of South Park, including Cartman, Stan, Kyle and Kenny.
The Spirit of Christmas: "Jesus vs. Santa"	December 1, 1995	The Hits: Volume 1	After Fox Broadcasting Company executive Brian Graden saw "Jesus vs. Frosty", he commissioned Parker and Stone to create a second short film that he could send to his friends as a video Christmas card in 1995. This was titled The Spirit of Christmas, also known as "Jesus vs. Santa", and it resembled the style of the later series more closely. The video was popular and widely shared, both by duplication and over the internet, and eventually led to the series.
Magic: The Gathering promotional bumper	February 5, 1997	N/A	A message shown on Comedy Central, promoting the trading card game Magic: The Gathering.
Cable ACE Awards 1997	November 14, 1997	N/A	A short created for the CableACE Awards of 1997.
A South Park Thanksgiving	November 20, 1997	The Complete First Season	A Thanksgiving-themed short, featuring talk show host Jay Leno, produced for The Tonight Show with Jay Leno.
O Holy Night	December 18, 1997	The Complete First Season	Eric Cartman tries to sing O Holy Night. Whenever he forgets the words, Kyle pokes him with a cattle prod.
Chef Aid: Behind the Menu	April 29, 1998	The Chef Experience	A Behind the Music-style promotional video for Chef Aid: The South Park Album, featuring interviews with Flea, Elton John, Meat Loaf, Ozzy Osbourne, and others. Also contains the music video for Master P's single "Kenny's Dead", from the same album.
Chocolate Salty Balls music video	1998	The Complete Second Season; The Chef Experience	Music video for the song "Chocolate Salty Balls (P.S. I Love You)" from Chef Aid: The South Park Album, performed by Isaac Hayes as Chef.
Kenny's Dead music video	1998	The Chef Experience	Music video for the Master P single "Kenny's Dead", which is featured on Chef Aid: The South Park Album. Animation, mixed with live action.
The Dead Friend Sketch	October 5, 1999	The Life of Python	A comedic remake of the "Dead Parrot sketch" from Monty Python's Flying Circus. It was featured on the television special Python Night – 30 Years of Monty Python.
The Gauntlet	June 8, 2000	N/A	A sketch spoofing the movies Gladiator and Battlefield Earth, as well as Scientology, which was produced for the 2000 MTV Movie Awards.
Eric Cartman NHL videos for the Los Angeles Kings	2002	N/A	"A series of promotional videos for the Los Angeles Kings of the NHL at live matches during the 2001–02 NHL season, where Cartman ridicules the mascots of rival teams and reacts to various aspects of the game.
The Aristocrats sketch	2005	The Aristocrats	Cartman tells the famous dirty joke called "The Aristocrats" to the boys. Featured in the 2005 documentary The Aristocrats.
Emmys Opening sketch	August 27, 2006	58th Primetime Emmy Awards	Host Conan O'Brien is trying to get to the show, but suddenly appears in Stan's room in an animated form. Stan begins yelling at him as he runs into the nearby closet. Stan calls Randy to help him get Conan to come out of the closet. Immediately following the entrance, he exits the closet and says, "There's someone else in there", referring to Tom Cruise, and leaves the door open. Cruise then pops out and closes the door.
Lil' Rush	2007	Rush: Snakes & Arrows Live	The boys form a music group called "Lil' Rush". Shown as an intro at the concerts of the Canadian rock band Rush on their Snakes & Arrows tour, before their song "Tom Sawyer".
Cartman introduces Colorado football lineup	November 23, 2007	N/A	Cartman introduces the starting offense and defense lineups of the University of Colorado Boulder's Buffaloes, during ABC's coverage of the 2007 match-up between the University of Colorado and the University of Nebraska.
Imaginationland: The Movie	March 11, 2008	South Park – Imaginationland	The eleventh season three-part "Imaginationland" story arc released as a combined direct-to-video film in 2008. Director's cut, including previously unseen scenes.
The Proust Questionnaire	April 5, 2008	NPR website	Trey Parker, in character as Cartman, gives answers to the Proust Questionnaire conducted by Julie Rovner of NPR.
Cartman's life lessons	October 7, 2008	The Cult of Cartman	Cartman shares a "life lesson" before every episode on The Cult of Cartman compilation DVD.
Cartman and The Hobbit	December 7, 2012	Video Game Awards 2012	The opening scene to the 2012 Video Game Awards, with The Hobbit and the true Grand Wizard... Eric Cartman.

=== Music ===
Chef Aid: The South Park Album, a compilation of original songs from the show, characters performing cover songs, and tracks performed by guest artists was released in 1998, while Mr. Hankey's Christmas Classics, a compilation of songs performed by the characters in the episode of the same name as well as other Christmas-themed songs was released in 1999, as was the soundtrack to the feature film. The song "Chocolate Salty Balls" (performed by Hayes as Chef) was released as a single in the UK in 1998 to support the Chef Aid: The South Park Album and became a number one hit.

To celebrate the show's 25th anniversary, live Broadway orchestral covers of the series' songs were performed, alongside the release date of the upcoming season.

On March 16, 2022, a live concert celebrating 25 years of South Park music was announced to take place at the Red Rocks Amphitheatre in Morrison, Colorado, on August 10, 2022. On June 7, 2022, a second concert was announced to take place on August 9, 2022. The concert featured appearances by Trey Parker and Matt Stone and music by Primus and Ween. The concert aired as a special on August 13 on Comedy Central, which was the anniversary date of the show's premiere, and again on August 14 on Paramount+.

=== Video games ===
Following the early success of the series, three video games based on the series were released by Acclaim Entertainment. A first-person shooter simply titled South Park was released in 1998 for the PC, Nintendo 64, and PlayStation. This was followed in 1999 by South Park: Chef's Luv Shack, a party video game featuring quizzes and mini-games, on the Dreamcast, PlayStation, Nintendo 64, and PC. In 2000, South Park Rally, a racing game, was released on the Dreamcast, PlayStation, Nintendo 64, and PC. Parker and Stone had little to do with the development of these games, apart from providing voice acting, and have publicly criticized Acclaim and the quality of the South Park games they produced.

There was a South Park game for the Game Boy Color developed by Crawfish Interactive and was to be released by Acclaim, but it was cancelled by Parker and Stone as they determined that making a mature-rated game for a console whose main demographic is children would be inappropriate. Parker and Stone have the prototype cartridge of the game, making it the first South Park video game ever made. Only one screenshot was published in Nintendo Power issue 114 in 1998. A ROM file for the game, in a complete state, was leaked online in August 2018. Crawfish later repurposed code from the cancelled South Park game for Maya the Bee & Her Friends, a platformer based on the Maya the Bee children's book series, and was also reskinned and released as The New Adventures of Mary Kate & Ashley in North America to tie in with the Mary-Kate and Ashley Olsen media franchise.

Another South Park game was in development for the PlayStation 2, Xbox, and GameCube in 2004 but was cancelled for unknown reasons. A prototype of the game was found in an Xbox development kit in 2015.

In 2010, the decision was made to form a small group called South Park Digital Studios, which would, among other things, work on creating new South Park games, that would involve the studio and the show's creators more heavily. The first such title is South Park Let's Go Tower Defense Play!, a tower defense game developed by Doublesix, which was released in 2009 for the Xbox Live Arcade service on the Xbox 360 console. Another Xbox Live Arcade game, South Park: Tenorman's Revenge, is a platformer which was released in the spring of 2012. South Park: The Stick of Truth is a role-playing video game that was written by Parker and Stone, and was originally scheduled to be released on March 5, 2013, for the Xbox 360 and PlayStation 3 consoles, and Microsoft Windows. The game was eventually released a year later in March 2014 to positive reviews. A sequel to The Stick of Truth, South Park: The Fractured but Whole, was released in October 2017 with similarly good reception. A mobile game, South Park: Phone Destroyer, was released for Android and iOS in November 2017. South Park: Snow Day!, a 3D co-op action game developed by Question and published by THQ Nordic, was released in March 2024 to mixed reviews.

== Merchandising ==
By 2000, the franchise generated over $250 million in retail sales. Merchandising related to the show is an industry which generates several million dollars a year. At the time of the show's premiere, the top-selling specialty T-shirt in the United States was based on South Park, and US$30 million in T-shirt sales was reached during the show's first season.

A South Park pinball machine was released in 1999 by Sega Pinball. The companies Fun 4 All, Mezco Toyz, and Mirage have produced various South Park action figures, collectibles, and plush dolls.

Comedy Central entered into an agreement with Frito-Lay to sell 1.5 million bags of Cheesy Poofs, Cartman's favorite snack from the show, at Walmart until the premiere of the second half of the fifteenth season on October 5, 2011.

== Art Exhibition ==
Coinciding with the 30th anniversary of South Park’s premiere, the Colorado History Museum will exhibit South Park: Handmade in Colorado featuring "original artwork, scripts, props, costumes, puppets, and never-before-seen items from the South Park archives." The exhibit will run December 6, 2026, through October 3, 2027 and "traces the origins of the show and its creators, Colorado natives Matt Stone and Trey Parker."
