= Volcano (South Park) =

- South Park episode
- Stan, Ned, Cartman, Jimbo and Kyle flee from the erupting volcano. The idea of an erupting volcano came from disaster films such as Volcano and Dante's Peak. The animators had some trouble creating lava that resembled orange construction paper, but were proud of the result.
- Episode no.: Season 1 Episode 2
- Written by: Trey Parker; Matt Stone
- Production code: 103
- Original air date: August 20, 1997

Episode chronology
← Previous "Cartman Gets an Anal Probe"	Next → "Weight Gain 4000"
- South Park season 1

"Volcano" is the second episode of the first season of the American animated television series South Park. It first aired on Comedy Central in the United States on August 20, 1997. In the episode, Stan, Kyle, Cartman and Kenny go on a hunting trip with Stan's uncle Jimbo and his war buddy Ned. While on the trip, Stan is frustrated by his unwillingness to shoot a living creature, and Cartman tries to scare the hunting party with tales of a creature named Scuzzlebutt. Meanwhile, the group is unaware that a nearby volcano is about to erupt.

The episode was written and directed by series co-creators Trey Parker and Matt Stone. It was inspired by the 1997 disaster films Volcano and Dante's Peak, both of which Parker and Stone strongly disliked. The plot was also based on the significant amount of hunting Parker and Stone witnessed while growing up in Colorado; Stan's hesitation about the sport mirrors Parker's real-life feelings about hunting. Parker and Stone felt the computer animation in "Volcano" had greatly improved compared to the early episodes; they were particularly pleased with the lava, which was made to resemble orange construction paper.

"Volcano" received generally positive reviews and was nominated for a 1997 Environmental Media Award. The episode featured the first appearances of recurring characters, Jimbo Kern, Ned Gerblansky, and Randy Marsh. The last, who is also the town geologist, is established as Stan's father in later episodes. It also marked the first of two appearances for Scuzzlebutt, who became a popular minor character and appeared in the video games South Park 10: The Game, South Park: Phone Destroyer, and South Park Rally. The episode parodied the Duck and Cover educational videos from the 1950s and 1960s that advised people to hide under tables in the event of a nuclear attack.

== Plot ==
Stan's Uncle Jimbo and his Vietnam War buddy Ned take Stan, Kenny, Kyle, and Cartman on a hunting trip in the mountains. As they arrive, Jimbo explains to the boys how to hunt. Whenever they see a creature, they shoot it after yelling, "It's coming right for us!", so they can claim the shooting was in self-defense. Stan does not have the proper temperament to enjoy hunting, and finds himself unable to shoot a living target. Unlike Stan, Kenny is able to shoot animals, impressing Jimbo. Meanwhile, a South Park geologist, Randy, discovers that the mountain on which the boys are hunting is a volcano that is about to erupt. He reports his findings to the Mayor, who directs one of her aides to make appropriate decisions about the crisis.

During the hunting trip, Jimbo proclaims Kenny his honorary nephew, upsetting Stan. When night falls, Cartman tells the story of Scuzzlebutt, a creature that has a piece of celery in place of one of its hands and Patrick Duffy for a leg. The boys are skeptical, so Cartman decides to dress up as the creature the next morning in order to convince and scare them. When he disappears the next morning, the others set out to find him. They then see Cartman disguised as Scuzzlebutt and start shooting at him. When they catch up with him at the base of the mountain, Stan tries to shoot him in order to redeem himself in his uncle's eyes. However, he is unable to do so and the delay gives Cartman time to remove the costume. At a lower elevation, Randy orders the South Park residents to dig a trench to divert the lava away from the town.

Suddenly, the volcano erupts. The hunters try to flee, but find themselves trapped on the other side of the trench. The real Scuzzlebutt then appears, and Jimbo apologizes to the boys for their seemingly imminent deaths, just before realizing that Scuzzlebutt is weaving a wicker basket to carry the hunting party to safety. The lava then flows through the trench just as Randy planned, but due to a miscalculation he made, the trench leads the lava to Denver, destroying it. However, in a misguided attempt to prove he can kill something and impress his uncle, Stan kills Scuzzlebutt. Jimbo is less than impressed, telling Stan that "some things you do kill and some you don't". Ned states that he now understands the folly of guns and drops his rifle, which accidentally fires, killing Kenny. Stan does not understand, since Jimbo tried to kill Scuzzlebutt earlier and other animals and wanted to impress Jimbo like Kenny did, Jimbo points out that Kenny is dead and that Stan will always be Jimbo's nephew. The boys decide that hunting is stupid and confusing, and decide to go home and watch cartoons.

== Production ==
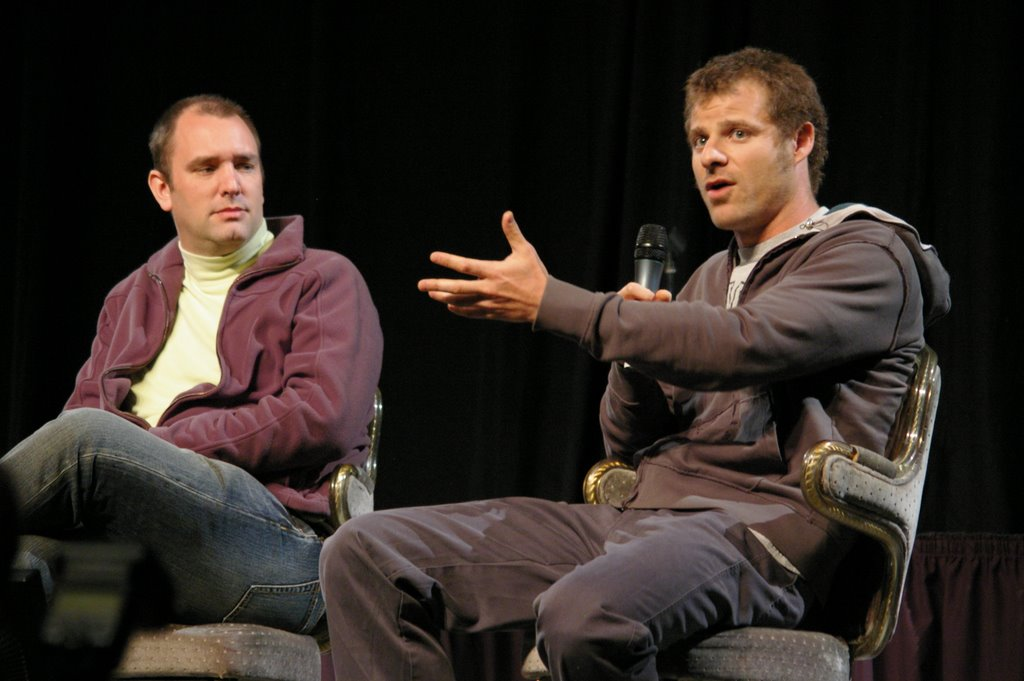
South Park co-creators Trey Parker and Matt Stone wrote and directed "Volcano"

"Volcano" was written and directed by series co-creators Trey Parker and Matt Stone. The episode was inspired by volcano-related Hollywood disaster films, such as Dante's Peak and Volcano (1997), which came out around the time they were writing the script; Parker and Stone considered the films two of the worst ever made. Stone said, "If you watch this episode and then go watch Volcano, this makes more sense than Volcano does." Debbie Liebling, who served as a South Park producer at the time of the episode's broadcast, said the volcano erupting in South Park helped establish the setting as a place where "anything can happen". Although Stone and Parker acknowledged that a volcano could not actually erupt in this Colorado town, they felt they were entitled to create the episode anyway because the Volcano film was set in Los Angeles; Stone said, "If they could do it, we could." Similarly, the duo acknowledge the tunnel built in the episode would not really divert the lava, but they included it because Parker said, "Any movie today, that's basically how dumb they are."

Another influence on the plot was the amount of hunting Parker and Stone saw around them while growing up in Colorado. Neither of them were hunters, and Parker said Stan's hesitation about hunting was based largely on himself and his father, who hated the idea of killing an animal even though Parker's grandfather, like Jimbo, was enthusiastic about the sport. Parker said he feels many of the first-season episodes considered taboo in 1997 would have been considered less controversial five years later, but that "Volcano" is an exception. Since the episode involved children drinking beer and threatening each other at gunpoint during hunting trips, Parker said he did not believe Comedy Central would have aired it following the Columbine High School massacre in 1999. Parker said, "Back then, it was just sort of funny, kids pointing guns at each other, and it's just not so funny now."

South Park animators spent the first four episodes of the show trying to perfect the animation of the characters. By "Volcano" – which was produced after "Weight Gain 4000" –, Parker and Stone felt the textures were improved, as well as smaller details like the lines around the eyes of the characters. While the series pilot "Cartman Gets an Anal Probe" was animated with construction paper, subsequent episodes were made using computers. Nevertheless, Parker and Stone wanted the show to maintain its crude paper look; for example, they specifically asked for the night sky in this episode to look like a black piece of paper with holes cut into it for stars, just as it was in the pilot episode. Stone and Parker were especially proud of the animation of the lava, which they said took hours to perfect, although they acknowledged it ended up simply resembling orange construction paper. The lava ball shooting out of the volcano and almost killing Kenny was directly inspired by the Volcano film. Parker and Stone came up with the character of Scuzzlebutt during a random conversation with Comedy Central executive Debbie Liebling. While meeting with her, they simply started drawing the character, and decided to add a celery hand and Patrick Duffy leg for no particular reason. Scuzzlebutt also appeared in a second episode, "City on the Edge of Forever" from the second season. Scuzzlebutt turning out to be a real character rather than a ridiculous story was the first instance of a common characteristic of the Cartman character, in which Cartman says outrageous and completely unrealistic things that turn out to be true. Stone commented, "He's right more often than he's wrong."

The "Volcano" episode was in production when South Park debuted on August 13, 1997. Comedy Central executives did not object to most of the content of the episode, but said the scene in which Kyle farted while talking to Stan should have been removed because nothing happened after the fart, and they said it was not funny. Parker and Stone, however, insisted it stay in the episode, and they said the lack of any reaction whatsoever to the fart was what made it funny. During close-ups of Cartman's face while telling the story of Scuzzlebutt around the campfire, the flames from the fire stop moving. Parker and Stone noticed the consistency error after the episode was filmed, but they did not have enough time to go back and fix it before the broadcast date, so it was left in. A cat featured in the background of one of the outdoor scenes was designed to look exactly like Parker's cat, Jake. The scene in which Ned catches fire was based on an experience Parker had during a Colorado camping trip where he tried to do an "Indian Fire Trick", in which one pours gasoline onto a fire to create large flames. Although nobody caught fire, Parker said the trick misfired, and he nearly burned down the forest. After finishing the episode, Parker and Stone realized "Volcano" was about two minutes shorter than the time length required for the episode. In order to add time to the episode, Parker and Stone added the scene with Ned singing the song "Kumbaya" around the fire, as well as the long freeze-frame on a shocked Chef and Mayor McDaniels reacting to the news of the volcano's imminent eruption.

In addition to Scuzzlebutt, "Volcano" included the first appearances of recurring characters Randy Marsh and Ned Gerblansky. In this first appearance, Randy is identified only as the South Park geologist, and it is only in the episode "An Elephant Makes Love to a Pig" that he is first introduced as Stan's father. Parker, who provides the voice of Randy Marsh, said the design, voice, and personality of the character are based on his real-life father, who works as a geologist for the United States Geological Survey. Parker said his father is very calm in real life, and Randy's relaxed reaction to learning of the volcano—calmly sipping his coffee—is "about how my dad would react to anything". The look of the Ned character was based on a drawing Parker made in high school, although the character did not originally have a voice box. The voice was inspired by a waitress who worked at a Kentucky Fried Chicken restaurant in Boulder, Colorado, where Parker and Stone would visit while attending the University of Colorado. The duo said they would go to the restaurant just to hear her voice, but that it was so low they would lose their appetite when she took their orders. Stone and Parker had trouble creating the right voice for the character; they tried putting the microphone directly on their throat, and also bought an actual voice box, but ultimately decided that the best way to provide the character's voice was with natural voice simulation.

"Volcano" was released alongside five other episodes in a three-VHS set on May 5, 1998, marking the first time South Park was made available on video. The episode was released on the "Volume I" video along with "Cartman Gets an Anal Probe"; other featured episodes included "An Elephant Makes Love to a Pig", "Death", "Weight Gain 4000", and "Big Gay Al's Big Gay Boat Ride". "South Park: The Complete First Season", a DVD box set featuring all thirteen episodes, including "Volcano", was released on November 12, 2002. Parker and Stone recorded commentary tracks for each episode, but the tracks were not included on the DVDs due to "standards" issues with some of the statements; Parker and Stone refused to allow the tracks to be edited and censored, so they were released on a separate CD.

== Cultural references and impact ==
The episode features a fictional education film called Lava and You, which says lava will pass harmlessly over potential victims who duck and cover their heads. The film was inspired by actual "Duck and Cover" films from the 1950s and 1960s, in which children were instructed to hide under tables or lean against walls in the case of a nuclear weapon attack; Parker and Stone, like many critics of the films, found the methods painfully simplistic and did not believe they would actually help in the case of such an attack. Jimbo and Ned are described as veterans of the Vietnam War, the military conflict between North Vietnam and South Vietnam that lasted from 1959 to 1975; Cartman, who is far too young to have participated in the war, claims to have flashbacks to his experiences in it. Patrick Duffy, the American television actor best known for his roles in the shows Dallas and Step by Step, appears in the episode as the living leg of Scuzzlebutt. Matt Stone claimed there was no particular reason Duffy was chosen as the leg, except that he is such a nondescript actor: "He's just super bland. Like, how could you possibly be a fan of Patrick Duffy?"

The scene where Scuzzlebutt puts a star on top of a tree is a reference to a similar scene in the 1964 television special Rudolph the Red-Nosed Reindeer, in which the Abominable Snow Monster places a Christmas star atop a large tree. Mount Evanston, the fictional mountain in "Volcano", was named after the real Mount Evans in the Front Range region of the Rocky Mountains in Clear Creek County, Colorado; Nichols Canyon in the episode was named after Kirt Nichols, a friend of Trey Parker. Jimbo blames the Democratic Party for passing overly restrictive laws on hunters and gun owners. Upon learning children are in danger due to the volcano, Mayor McDaniels seeks publicity for herself by contacting the television news programs Entertainment Tonight and Inside Edition.

Several lines of dialogue from "Volcano" became especially popular among South Park fans, including "It's coming right for us!" by Jimbo, and the two Cartman lines, "Democrats piss me off!" and "Cartoons Kick Ass!", the last of which was featured on T-shirts. Despite the relatively small role Scuzzlebutt played in the series, he nevertheless became a popular minor South Park character. He was included in the South Park video games South Park 10: The Game and South Park Rally. The song "Hot Lava", sung by the Chef in the episode, was featured on the 1998 soundtrack Chef Aid: The South Park Album.

A recreation of the episode serves as the Wizard Mode of the South Park pinball machine produced by Sega in 1999.

== Reception ==
"Volcano" originally aired on Comedy Central in the United States on August 20, 1997. The Environmental Media Association nominated the episode for an Environmental Media Award in the "TV Episodic Comedy" category. However, the eventual recipient of the award was The Simpsons, for the episode "The Old Man and the Lisa".

"Volcano" received generally positive reviews. USA Today critic Matt Roush praised the episode, especially the "Duck and Cover" films. The Advertiser called the episode "outrageously lewd" and "hysterically funny". The Washington Post critic Tom Shales considered the episode funnier than its predecessor "Weight Gain 4000". Peter Hawes of The Sunday Star-Times in Auckland, New Zealand, said the episode was funny and intelligent, adding, "Once again, the US national psyche is imperishably captured by a crude cartoon." He liked the way adults were portrayed as less sensible than the children, and he particularly enjoyed the "Duck and Cover" videos: "It is terrifyingly funny, for it is a word-for-word recreation of the insane Atom-bomb Safety film, created and distributed in 1952 by the US government, who never for a second thought it would work." The Daily Record of Glasgow, Scotland, praised the episode and described it as "hardcore humour": "Love it or loathe it, you can't ignore the adult animation series whose bite is worse than its bark."
