= List of South Park video games =

There are ten video games based upon the American animated television series South Park.

== Video games ==
Game	Details
South Park Original release date(s): December 21, 1998	Release years by system: 1998 – Nintendo 64 1999 – Microsoft Windows, PlayStation
South Park Original release date(s): December 21, 1998	Notes: Developed by Iguana Entertainment/Appaloosa Interactive; Published by Acclaim Entertainment; Distributed by Comedy Central
South Park: Chef's Luv Shack Original release date(s): October 12, 1999	Release years by system: 1999 – Nintendo 64, Dreamcast, PlayStation, Microsoft Windows
South Park: Chef's Luv Shack Original release date(s): October 12, 1999	Notes: Developed by Acclaim Studios Austin; Published by Acclaim Entertainment; Distributed by Comedy Central
South Park Rally Original release date(s): January 5, 2000	Release years by system: 2000 – Dreamcast, PlayStation, Nintendo 64, Microsoft Windows
South Park Rally Original release date(s): January 5, 2000	Notes: Developed by Tantalus Interactive; Published by Acclaim Entertainment; Distributed by Comedy Central
South Park 10: The Game Original release date(s): March 28, 2007	Release years by system: 2007 – Mobile phones
South Park 10: The Game Original release date(s): March 28, 2007	Notes: Developed by Mr.Goodliving; Published by RealNetworks
South Park Imaginationland Original release date(s): July 10, 2008	Release years by system: 2008 – Mobile phones
South Park Imaginationland Original release date(s): July 10, 2008	Notes: Developed by Mr.Goodliving; Published by RealNetworks
South Park Mega Millionaire Original release date(s): 2009	Release years by system: September, 2009 – iOS 2011 - Xperia Play
South Park Mega Millionaire Original release date(s): 2009	Notes: Developed by GameHouse
South Park Let's Go Tower Defense Play! Original release date(s): October 7, 2009	Release years by system: 2009 – Xbox Live Arcade
South Park Let's Go Tower Defense Play! Original release date(s): October 7, 2009	Notes: Developed by Doublesix, in collaboration with South Park Digital Studios and Xbox Live Productions; Published by Xbox Game Studios; First game in the franchise to contain uncensored audio
South Park: Tenorman's Revenge Original release date(s): March 30, 2012	Release years by system: 2012 – Xbox Live Arcade
South Park: Tenorman's Revenge Original release date(s): March 30, 2012	Notes: Developed by Other Ocean Interactive, in collaboration with South Park Digital Studios; Published by Xbox Game Studios
South Park: The Stick of Truth Original release date(s): March 4, 2014	Release years by system: 2014 – Microsoft Windows, PlayStation 3, Xbox 360 2018 – Nintendo Switch, PlayStation 4, Xbox One
South Park: The Stick of Truth Original release date(s): March 4, 2014	Notes: Developed by Obsidian Entertainment, in collaboration with South Park Digital Studios; Publishing rights purchased by Ubisoft due to THQ filing for bankruptcy, resulting in the game's release being delayed
South Park Pinball Original release date(s): 2014	Release years by system: 2014 – Android, iOS, Microsoft Windows, PlayStation 3, PlayStation 4, PlayStation Vita, Wii U, Xbox 360, Xbox One 2017 – Nintendo Switch; 2023 – PlayStation 5, Xbox Series X/S
South Park Pinball Original release date(s): 2014	Notes: Developed by Zen Studios, in collaboration with South Park Digital Studios.; Previously available as a premium add-on for Zen Pinball 2 and Pinball FX 2, and a paid stand-alone app for smartphone platforms (now removed due to licensing issues). It was remastered and released for Pinball FX on October 12, 2023.; Not based on the physical 1999 Sega Pinball South Park pinball table. Includes two tables, South Park Super Sweet Pinball, and Butters' Own Pinball Game.; The first and only South Park video game to be rated Everyone 10+ by the ESRB.
South Park: The Fractured but Whole Original release date(s): October 17, 2017	Release years by system: 2017 – Microsoft Windows, PlayStation 4, Xbox One 2018 – Nintendo Switch
South Park: The Fractured but Whole Original release date(s): October 17, 2017	Notes: Developed by Ubisoft San Francisco, in collaboration with South Park Digital Studios, Ubisoft Osaka, Massive Entertainment, Ubisoft Annecy, Ubisoft Reflections, Blue Byte, and Ubisoft Quebec.
South Park: Phone Destroyer Original release date(s): November 9, 2017	Release years by system: 2017 – iOS, Android
South Park: Phone Destroyer Original release date(s): November 9, 2017	Notes: Developed by Ubisoft RedLynx, in collaboration with Ubisoft Pune and South Park Digital Studios
South Park: Snow Day! Original release date(s): March 26, 2024	Release years by system: 2024 – Microsoft Windows, Nintendo Switch, PlayStation 5, Xbox Series X/S
South Park: Snow Day! Original release date(s): March 26, 2024	Notes: Developed by Question, published by THQ Nordic, in collaboration with South Park Digital Studios

== Canceled games ==
A South Park game was in development for the Game Boy Color (1998), as well as one for Xbox, GameCube and PlayStation 2. Both games were cancelled shortly before release, due to the show's creators Matt Stone and Trey Parker expressing concerns about releasing a game on a platform marketed primarily towards children, although the Game Boy Color ROM was leaked in 2018. The Game Boy Color game was reskinned into a Maya the Bee video game titled Maya the Bee & Her Friends, which was released in 1999; the game was also reskinned as The New Adventures of Mary-Kate and Ashley, based on Mary-Kate and Ashley Olsen and was released in North America, being one of the various video games based on the duo.

Another game entitled A Week in South Park was also in development for the PlayStation and PC during the same time as South Park. This game was reported to be "around 15 percent done" before it was canceled.
