= Weight Gain 4000 =

- South Park episode
- An advertisement for the bodybuilding supplement "Weight Gain 4000", which serves as a commentary on American consumerism.
- Episode no.: Season 1 Episode 3
- Directed by: Trey Parker; Matt Stone
- Written by: Trey Parker; Matt Stone
- Production code: 102
- Original air date: August 27, 1997

Episode chronology
← Previous "Volcano"	Next → "Big Gay Al's Big Gay Boat Ride"
- South Park season 1

"Weight Gain 4000" is the third episode of the first season of the American animated television series South Park. It first aired on Comedy Central in the United States on August 27, 1997. In the episode, the residents of South Park excitedly prepare for a visit by celebrity Kathie Lee Gifford, whom the boys' third-grade teacher Mr. Garrison plans to assassinate because of a childhood grudge. In the meantime, Cartman becomes extremely obese after constantly eating a bodybuilding supplement called Weight Gain 4000.

The episode was written and directed by series co-founders Trey Parker and Matt Stone. After the South Park pilot episode, "Cartman Gets an Anal Probe", drew poor test audience results, Comedy Central requested a script for one more new episode before deciding whether or not to commit to a full series. The resulting script for "Weight Gain 4000" helped the network decide to pick up the show. It was the first South Park episode created completely using computers instead of construction paper. This was shown as the second episode of the first season in the United Kingdom, ahead of "Volcano".

Although some reviewers criticized the episode for its profanity and other material deemed offensive at the time of its original broadcast, several others felt "Weight Gain 4000" was a significant improvement over the pilot, particularly for its satirical element regarding American consumerism, and its parody of assassination of John F. Kennedy. The episode introduced such recurring characters as Mayor McDaniels, Bebe Stevens, and Clyde Donovan. The show's portrayal of Kathie Lee Gifford was the first time a celebrity was spoofed in South Park.

== Plot ==
South Park Elementary teacher Mr. Garrison announces that Cartman has won the school's "Save Our Fragile Planet" essay contest, much to the anger of his classmate Wendy Testaburger, who immediately suspects him of cheating. The rest of the town becomes a flurry of excitement upon learning celebrity television host Kathie Lee Gifford will come to South Park to present Cartman with an award on national television. Mayor McDaniels plans a big event to showcase the town, with hopes of furthering her own career. Mr. Garrison directs rehearsals for a play with the schoolchildren depicting the history of South Park, which is to be shown at the event. Mayor McDaniels is horrified, however, to learn the historically accurate play includes children playing pioneers who attack and brutally beat the students portraying Native Americans. Garrison later gets fired for badmouthing Gifford.

Unbeknownst to the rest of town, Mr. Garrison relives a traumatic childhood memory in which a young Gifford defeated him in a national talent show. Mr. Garrison is manipulated by his hand puppet, Mr. Hat, to assassinate Gifford out of revenge. He purchases a large rifle from Jimbo's gun shop and plots to shoot Gifford. Meanwhile, Cartman is excited to appear on live television, and Mayor McDaniels instructs him to get into shape for Gifford's visit. Seeing a television commercial for a bodybuilding supplement called "Weight Gain 4000", Cartman asks his mother to buy it for him. Cartman becomes extremely fat from the product, although he believes he is in excellent shape and the excess weight is strictly muscle. Back at the school, Wendy looks through Mr. Garrison's papers and confirms Cartman indeed cheated on the contest by writing his name on a copy of Walden by Henry David Thoreau. Wendy also learns about Mr. Garrison's assassination plan, and enlists the help of her friend Stan to stop him.

Gifford arrives, and most of the town attends the celebratory event, where Chef sings a song to seduce her. Mr. Garrison takes his position in a tall book depository, but he is frustrated to see that Gifford is hidden behind a bulletproof glass bubble. Wendy and Stan arrive and try unsuccessfully to stop Mr. Garrison, saying that they understand his pain, but when Stan accidentally reignites Garrison's anger, he decides to go through with the assassination. Just as he is about to fire, Cartman's new immense weight causes the stage to collapse, catapulting Gifford off it, and causing the bullet to hit Kenny in the head. Kenny is propelled through the air and impaled on a flagpole. Gifford's bodyguards whisk Gifford away, costing a disappointed Cartman his chance to be on television. Wendy takes to the stage and reveals that Cartman cheated on his essay, but the townspeople are too upset about Gifford's departure to care. Mr. Garrison is taken to a mental hospital, where Mr. Hat is placed into a straitjacket. Mr. Garrison apologizes to the kids for costing the town a chance to be on television, although Kyle explains to him that Cartman is now appearing on talk show Geraldo because of his tremendous obesity. Meanwhile, Chef is lying in bed with Gifford post-coital while watching Geraldo.

== Production ==
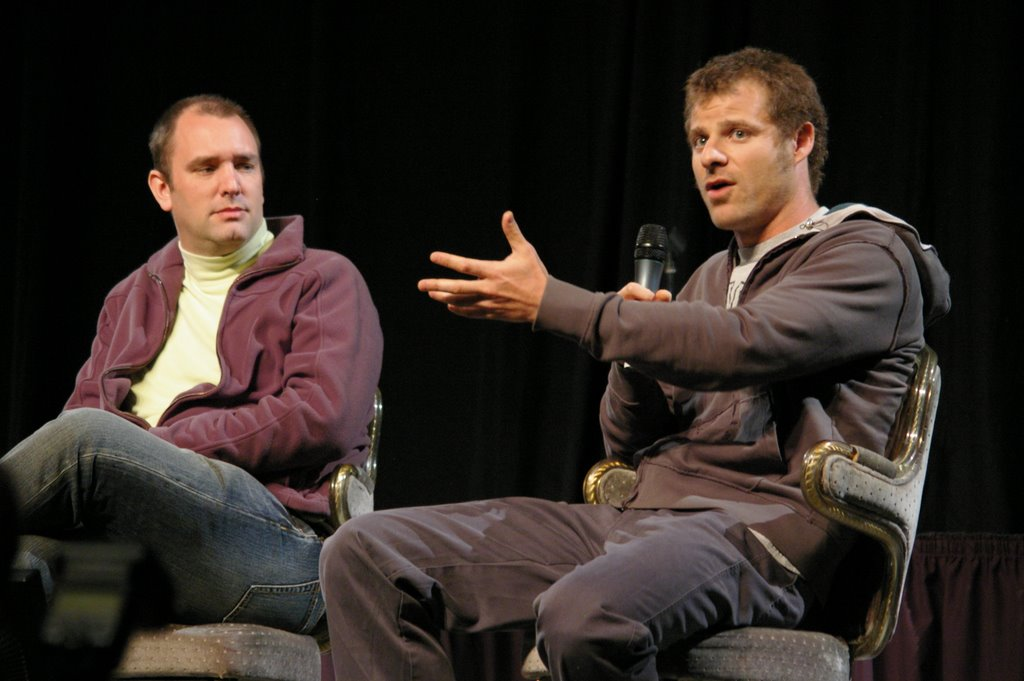
South Park co-creators Trey Parker (left) and Matt Stone wrote "Weight Gain 4000" when Comedy Central executives requested a script for a new episode while considering picking up the series.

"Weight Gain 4000" was written and directed by series co-creators Trey Parker and Matt Stone. It first aired on Comedy Central in the United States on August 27, 1997. The South Park pilot, "Cartman Gets an Anal Probe", did not do well with test audiences, and Comedy Central executives were unsure whether they wanted to order any additional episodes. However, they paid Parker and Stone to write another script when Internet buzz began to generate about the duo and their work on The Spirit of Christmas, the 1995 animated short film that served as a precursor to South Park. The network opted not to commit to a full Comedy Central series until they could read the newly commissioned script. The result was "Weight Gain 4000", which the two South Park creators wrote while they were working on their 1997 comedy-action film, Orgazmo.

In writing the script, the duo sought to give Comedy Central executives an idea of what the series would be like and how each show could differ from the others. Parker and Stone also said they would not write another script until the network signed off on the full show with a season of at least six episodes. Comedy Central liked the script and agreed to commit to a series. While "Cartman Gets an Anal Probe" was created almost entirely with construction paper, "Weight Gain 4000" was the first South Park episode made completely using computers. It was created in little over a month in a studio in Westwood, California, by about 15 animators using PowerAnimator, the Alias Systems Corporation animation program most commonly known as "Alias", which would be used in subsequent episodes. In the future, South Park shows would be created within a week of their broadcast dates and require about 40 animators. "Weight Gain 4000" was animated in chronological order from beginning to end. Although Parker and Stone sought to improve the details and textures of the characters and overall animation, they also specifically chose Alias because it would allow the animation to maintain the deliberately crude visual style they first created with construction paper in The Spirit of Christmas and "Cartman Gets an Anal Probe".

The South Park creators and animators said they were still developing the characters and trying to figure out the future direction of the show with "Weight Gain 4000", which was more slow-paced than the series would eventually become. The 30-page script was shorter than in later episodes, which would average between 45 and 50 pages. The child protagonists also spoke slower. While recording their voice performances, the actors read the lines slowly and the dialogue was then sped up to create the characters' distinctive voices. At that time, Parker and Stone had not mastered the pace at which they needed to speak. The crowd shots in "Weight Gain 4000" took a particularly long time to animate due to the large number of people featured, and the animators were especially proud of the use of depth and motion in the perspective of the crosshairs in Mr. Garrison's rifle scope as he tried to assassinate Kathie Lee Gifford. Mr. Garrison's hatred for Gifford was foreshadowed in "Cartman Gets an Anal Probe", where the sentence "I'm not positive, but I think Cathy [sic] Lee Gifford is much older than she claims to be", can be seen on his classroom's chalkboard. During a flashback scene in "Weight Gain 4000", an eight-year-old Mr. Garrison is shown to already be bald on top with gray hair on the side of his ears. This led to an inconsistency in the first season episode "Cartman's Mom is a Dirty Slut", in which he has a full head of hair during a flashback.

== Themes ==
Describing the general tone of the show, Teri Fitsell of The New Zealand Herald explains that "South Park is a vicious social satire that works by spotlighting not the immorality of these kids but their amorality, and contrasting it with the conniving hypocrisy of the adults who surround them." The humor of the show comes from the disparity between the cute appearance of the characters and their crude behavior. However, Parker and Stone said in an early interview that the show's language is realistic. "There are so many shows where little kids are good and sweet, and it's just not real ... Don't people remember what they were like in third grade? We were little bastards."

Although these elements were established in "Cartman Gets an Anal Probe" and the Spirit of Christmas precursor cartoons, "Weight Gain 4000" further pushed the conventions of television, and especially of animated television entertainment. In addition to a continued stream of profanities and the promiscuous activities of Chef, an elementary school employee, the episode presents the character of Mr. Garrison as more and more unhinged. Although entrusted with the care of an elementary school class, Mr. Garrison demonstrates a questionable gender identity, poor teaching and unusual relationship with his Mr. Hat hand puppet.

"Weight Gain 4000" served as a commentary on American consumerism, the equation of personal happiness with consumption and the purchase of material possessions. This satire is particularly demonstrated by Cartman's blind faith in the Weight Gain 4000 bodybuilding supplement product despite strong evidence that the product fails at its primary function. Specifically, the product promises to build muscle, and Cartman believes it has fulfilled this function even after he only becomes extremely overweight. This blind faith is also illustrated by the complete disregard Cartman demonstrates for warnings that Weight Gain 4000 carries a risk of permanent damage to the liver and kidneys. The tremendous amount of product Cartman buys is further indicative of American purchasing habits.

Cartman's impulse to buy a bodybuilding supplement based on a single commercial has been described as a satire of the concept of "identity shopping". The concept involves the obtaining of an identity through what one owns, wears or buys, just as Cartman seeks to remake himself as a bodybuilder by buying Weight Gain 4000. "Weight Gain 4000" also satirizes the obsession with celebrity prevalent among most Americans, particularly through the town's overly enthusiastic reaction to Kathie Lee Gifford's appearance. Additionally, Anglican theologian Paul F. M. Zahl has suggested Cartman's addiction to food in the episode, combined with his blind faith in the Weight Gain 4000 supplement and his insistence to "follow your dreams", reflects the idea that many people falsely cling to the notion of free will when they in fact lack any self-control whatsoever. Zahl wrote, "The two writers of South Park see through the myth of 'free will.'"

== Cultural references and impact ==
Kathie Lee Gifford's bulletproof vehicle from "Weight Gain 4000" (below) was based on the popemobile (above), the vehicle used to transport the Pope.

"Weight Gain 4000" introduced several characters who would maintain important recurring roles throughout the rest of the series. Among them were Mayor McDaniels and Wendy's best friend Bebe Stevens. It also introduces Clyde Donovan, a student from Mr. Garrison's class who would eventually play significant roles in future seasons, although he was not identified by name. The characters demonstrate the wide range of often-extreme personalities among the adult residents of South Park, as well as serving as individual satires. McDaniels, who imagines herself an instant star upon being seen on television with Gifford, is portrayed as more caring about her own fame than the needs of her constituents, and the neglect with which Jimbo sells a gun to an obviously unstable Mr. Garrison serves as a satire of gun control. Jimbo and his friend Ned (who was introduced in "Volcano") were inspired by caricatures Parker used to draw during high school. In creating McDaniels, Parker and Stone envisioned a sophisticated mayor who was convinced she was better than the other residents of South Park. The episode also marked the first reference to Jesus and Pals, the public-access television talk show hosted by Jesus Christ. The fictional show is mentioned twice in the background during commercials on television sets, although footage from the show itself is not shown until "Big Gay Al's Big Gay Boat Ride" later in the season. Jesus and Pals, and the idea of Jesus as a South Park resident, are references to the original The Spirit of Christmas cartoon. Debbie Liebling, who served as a South Park producer at the time of the episode's broadcast, said the inclusion of a television show hosted by Jesus helped convey for audiences the idea of South Park as a place where "anything can happen".

Kathie Lee Gifford, then a television hostess on the morning talk show Live with Regis and Kathie Lee, was the first of many celebrities to be spoofed in a South Park episode. The South Park creators said they chose Gifford completely at random, not based on any particular reason or distaste for her. Shortly after "Weight Gain 4000" aired, the tabloid The Globe hired Suzen Johnson to film herself seducing Frank Gifford, Kathie Lee's husband, for a newspaper story. The incident was the first of what Parker and Stone called the "South Park Curse", in which something tragic or embarrassing supposedly happens to a celebrity shortly before or after they were featured in South Park. Actress Karri Turner provided the voice of Gifford in "Weight Gain 4000", marking her first and only guest appearance on South Park. Gifford appears at a parade hidden inside a bulletproof glass bubble. The bubble was inspired by an appearance Pope John Paul II made in the Popemobile during a trip to Denver, which was attended by Parker and Stone. They thought the design of the Popemobile, which has a bulletproof booth built into the back of a modified truck, was "hilarious". The design of the trophy that Gifford was to give to Cartman is a reference to Parker and Stone's 1997 film Orgazmo.

The line "Beefcake", which Eric Cartman enthusiastically screams after hearing it on a Weight Gain 4000 commercial, became a well-known catchphrase following the episode's broadcast, and clothing items with Cartman shouting the line became very popular. One of the earliest and largest South Park fan sites was called www.beef-cake.com. Matt Stone and site creator Taison Tan decided to shut the site down in April 2001 when the official site South Park Studios launched. South Park: Chef's Luv Shack, a 1999 video game from developer Acclaim, included a mini-game called "Beefcake", in which players control a Cartman character who moves back and forth between the screen eating cans of Weight Gain 4000 that are thrown down at him. The salesmen from "Weight Gain 4000" are featured as antagonists in the mini-game. The "beefcake" commercial featured in the episode is also briefly seen in the third season episode "Two Guys Naked in a Hot Tub", when Stan is quickly flipping through channels on his television.

== Release and reception ==
When "Weight Gain 4000" premiered, many writers in the mainstream media were still debating the longevity and overall quality of South Park. With the series still in its earliest stages, the episode continued to shock many with its frequent use of profanities by children and the apparent instability of school teacher Mr. Garrison. Audiences were especially shocked by the violence depicted among children during a South Park history play, which included the use of guns and portrayed the bloody slaughter of Native Americans at the hands of white settlers. Audiences were also shocked and offended by Chef's sexually suggestive song about Gifford. Nevertheless, several reviewers declared "Weight Gain 4000" a significant improvement over the pilot, "Cartman Gets an Anal Probe", and felt it went in a much more satirical direction.

"Just when I thought 'Cartman' assayed about one-third wit to two-thirds Butt-head sniggering, "Weight Gain 4000" proved that South Park could be a very funny show after all."

— Tom Shales,
The Washington Post

Jeff Simon of The Buffalo News, who did not like "Cartman Gets an Anal Probe", felt "Weight Gain 4000" proved the series could be funny. He specifically complimented the episode's commentary on American consumerism. Simon wrote, "It's all very bitter social satire, and if it weren't on Comedy Central, believe me, no one in networkland would think it ready for prime time. And you know what else? It's funny." Likewise, The Washington Post critic Tom Shales strongly criticized "Cartman Gets an Anal Probe", but said the second episode was funny and included "cleverly intertwined" plot-lines. Shales said, "[It] suggests the show may be an attempt at satire and not just poopy humor ... Yes, it's still sick and still twisted, but somehow this episode at least appears to have some comic ingenuity behind it, whereas the first was just a smutfest." In 2006, "Weight Gain 4000" was identified by Winnipeg Free Press as one of the ten most memorable South Park episodes, and ranked twelfth in a list of the top 25 greatest Cartman moments, as determined by voters on the Comedy Central website. The Daily Record in Scotland listed the episode's ending, and the "Beefcake!" line, as one of the six most memorable moments in the series.

"Weight Gain 4000" was released, alongside five other episodes, in a three-VHS set on May 5, 1998, marking the first time South Park was made available on video. It was released on the "Volume II" video, along with "Big Gay Al's Big Gay Boat Ride"; other featured episodes included "Cartman Gets an Anal Probe", "Volcano", "An Elephant Makes Love to a Pig" and "Death". "Weight Gain 4000", along with the other 12 episodes from the first season, was also included in the DVD release "South Park: The Complete First Season", which was released on November 12, 2002. Parker and Stone recorded commentary tracks for each episode, but they were not included with the DVDs due to "standards" issues with some of the statements. They refused to allow the tracks to be edited and censored, so they were released in a CD separately from the DVDs. In 2008, the duo made "Weight Gain 4000" and all other South Park episodes available to watch for free on the show's official website, South Park Studios.
