= South Park season 1 =

Season of television series

South Park
- Season 1
- Home media release cover
- No. of episodes: 13

Release
- Original network: Comedy Central
- Original release: August 13, 1997 – February 25, 1998

Season chronology
- Next → Season 2

The first season of the animated television series South Park aired on Comedy Central from August 13, 1997 to February 25, 1998. The creators Trey Parker and Matt Stone wrote most of the season's episodes; Dan Sterling, Philip Stark and David Goodman were credited with writing five episodes. The narrative revolves around four children—Stan Marsh, Kyle Broflovski, Eric Cartman and Kenny McCormick—and their unusual experiences in the titular mountain town.

South Park originated from Parker and Stone's 1992 animated short, The Spirit of Christmas (also known as Jesus vs. Frosty). The low-budget, crudely made film featured prototypes of South Park's main characters and was followed in 1995 by another short film of the same name, generally referred to as Jesus vs. Santa, which became popular and was widely shared over the Internet. The short's popularity caused Parker and Stone to develop a series based on it, and the project was first considered for purchase by the Fox Broadcasting Company. Fox ultimately passed on the show, and Comedy Central signed on to produce the series instead. South Park debuted on August 13, 1997 on Comedy Central with an initial run of six episodes; due to its success, an additional seven episodes were quickly produced. The complete season was released on DVD on November 12, 2002.

The first season was a ratings success for Comedy Central. The Nielsen ratings rose from 1.3 to 6.4 from the first to the tenth episode. Several episodes received award nominations, including for a 1998 Emmy Award in the "Outstanding Animated Program (for Programming Less Than One Hour)" and a GLAAD Award in the "Outstanding TV – Individual Episode" category for the episode "Big Gay Al's Big Gay Boat Ride". During the season, South Park won a CableACE Award for "Best Animated Series" and was nominated for a 1998 Annie Award in the "Outstanding Achievement in an Animated Primetime or Late Night Television Program".

The show was a financial success for Comedy Central and helped the network transform into "a cable industry power almost overnight".

== Voice cast ==
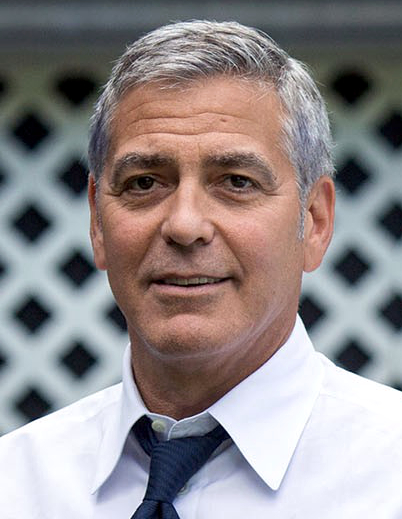
George Clooney (pictured in 2016), made a guest appearance in "Big Gay Al's Big Gay Boat Ride"

=== Main cast ===
- Trey Parker as Stan Marsh, Eric Cartman, Randy Marsh, Mr. Garrison, Clyde Donovan,Tolkien Black, Mr. Hankey, Mr. Mackey and Phillip
- Matt Stone as Kyle Broflovski, Kenny McCormick, Gerald Broflovski, Stuart McCormick, Jimbo Kern, Terrance, Pip Pirrup and Jesus
- Mary Kay Bergman as Wendy Testaburger, Liane Cartman, Sheila Broflovski, Shelly Marsh, Sharon Marsh and Carol McCormick
- Isaac Hayes as Chef

=== Guest cast ===
- George Clooney as Sparky ("Big Gay Al's Big Gay Boat Ride")
- Michael Buffer as himself ("Damien")
- Natasha Henstridge as Ms. Ellen (credited as "The Chick from Species") ("Tom's Rhinoplasty")
- Robert Smith as himself ("Mecha-Streisand")
- Jay Leno as Mr. Kitty ("Cartman's Mom Is a Dirty Slut")

== Episodes ==
No. overall	No. in season	Title	Directed by	Written by	Original release date	Prod. code	U.S. viewers (millions)
1	1	"Cartman Gets an Anal Probe"	Trey Parker	Trey Parker & Matt Stone	August 13, 1997	101	0.89
While waiting for the bus, Cartman explains his nightmare where he was drug out of bed and anally probed by aliens, which slowly becomes true when Kyle's baby brother Ike is kidnapped. He, Stan, and Kenny go to extreme lengths to rescue him. Despite the circumstances, Cartman remains in denial, even when he has stomach issues, which, in a chain of events, unravels to a satellite dish, baiting the aliens and saving Ike.
2	2	"Volcano"	Trey Parker & Matt Stone	Trey Parker & Matt Stone	August 20, 1997	103	1.11
On a weekend trip, Stan, Kyle, Cartman, and Kenny go hunting with Stan's Uncle Jimbo and Ned Gerblanski, where they sing songs, blow up fish, and drink massive amounts of beer. Meanwhile, Randy, a geologist, discovers that the mountain is an active volcano that is about to erupt. The town gathers its officials to save the hunters, with a little help from a creature from one of Cartman's stories.
3	3	"Weight Gain 4000"	Trey Parker & Matt Stone	Trey Parker & Matt Stone	August 27, 1997	102	0.72
After winning an award for an environmental essay, the town invites Kathie Lee Gifford to present the award. However, Mr. Garrison, driven by Mr. Hat, plots to assassinate her after losing to her in a talent show. Meanwhile, Cartman uses a dietary supplement to lose weight, but accidentally becomes the fattest person in all of South Park. Wendy discovers that he cheated, but nobody cares because Mr. Garrison accidentally murders Kenny. As a result, he is sent to a psychiatric hospital. In the end, Cartman fulfills his dream of being on TV with Geraldo Rivera, and Chef achieves his dream of sexual intercourse with Gifford.
4	4	"Big Gay Al's Big Gay Boat Ride"	Trey Parker	Trey Parker & Matt Stone	September 3, 1997	104	0.69
Due to his dog Sparky's actions of mating with other male dogs, Stan becomes embarrassed when Cartman makes fun of him for having a homosexual dog. Things get worse when Mr. Garrison expresses homophobia toward Sparky. In a final desperate attempt, Stan tries to hook Sparky up with a female dog, but it also fails when Sparky pickpockets her. In the end, the dog runs away to Big Gay Al's Animal Sanctuary, where he finds peace, and Stan learns the values of being gay. Meanwhile, Jimbo places a bet on the South Park Cows football team to score at least 70 points in the game. Due to Stan's absence, he decides to rig a bomb on the opposing team, which will detonate if a singer hits a high note. However, Stan returns just in time to win the game and explains the meaning of homosexuality.
5	5	"An Elephant Makes Love to a Pig"	Trey Parker (uncredited)	Trey Parker, Matt Stone & Dan Sterling	September 10, 1997	105	1.29
Stan complains to the boys about his abusive sister, Shelley, while Kyle's mom, Sheila, refuses to let him keep an elephant. In response, he and Cartman decide to crossbreed the elephant with Cartman's pet pig to create a smaller elephant and win a science contest against Terrance, who proposes a bet. They visit Terrance's father, Dr. Mephesto, who claims that their crossbreeding idea is unrealistic and won't work. On their way out, he secretly takes a blood sample from Stan. With advice from Chef, Stan and Kyle drug the animals to begin mating. As Terrance gets closer to finishing his project, Mephesto's blood sample spirals into a full evil clone of Stan, which terrorizes the town. After the clone is killed, their new pig—which has an uncanny resemblance to Mr. Garrison—wins first prize.
6	6	"Death"	Matt Stone	Trey Parker & Matt Stone	September 17, 1997	106	1.13
On Stan's grandpa's 102nd birthday, he urges Stan to kill him, as he feels too weak to do it himself. Stan refuses multiple times, fearing the trouble he might get into, but his grandpa continues to push him. Meanwhile, Sheila organizes a boycott against the boys' favorite show, Terrance and Phillip, due to its obnoxious humor. The boycott spreads among the adults, ultimately succeeding when a mass protest ends in suicide, and the show is replaced by She's the Sheriff. Feeling guilt-tripped, Stan and the boys attempt to kill Stan's grandpa by crushing him with a cow, but they are interrupted by Death, who seems to have come for Grandpa. However, because Terrance and Phillip were canceled, Death instead kills Kenny. After a confrontation with his deceased grandfather, Grandpa decides to travel to Africa to die naturally.
7	7	"Pinkeye"	Trey Parker & Matt Stone	Trey Parker, Matt Stone & Philip Stark	October 29, 1997	107	2.67 1.73 (HH) (Note: (HH) indicates the amount of households an episode was viewed in when it premiered.)
Following his death from being crushed by the MIR Space Station, Kenny's embalming is poisoned with Worcestershire sauce, leading to his rise as a zombie. He goes to school as usual, with everyone believing he's cosplaying for Halloween. Stan dresses as Raggedy Andy, Kyle as Chewbacca, and Cartman (originally dressed as Adolf Hitler) ends up resembling a Ku Klux Klan member as a ghost. As the zombie apocalypse begins to spread throughout town, the doctors misdiagnose the condition as pinkeye, and Chef becomes zombified, symbolizing Michael Jackson. While Stan and Kyle slaughter the zombies, they realize that the carnage is unnecessary and that they only need to kill Kenny all over again, which they do. However, Kenny rises once more but is immediately taken down by a statue and a fighter jet.
8	8	"Starvin' Marvin"	Trey Parker	Trey Parker	November 19, 1997	109	3.68 2.20 (HH)
Driven by a commercial featuring Sally Struthers, which promises a Teiko digital sports watch for charity for an Ethiopian child, the boys decide to donate. However, instead of receiving a watch, they unexpectedly adopt a child named Starvin' Marvin. They have him stay with them and take him to a buffet for $7 (which Kenny can't afford). Cartman misunderstands the concept of Thanksgiving and refuses to share his food with Marvin, even stealing the latter's meal. Dr. Mephesto stirs up trouble once again by accidentally unleashing a horde of turkeys. Cartman is mistaken for Marvin and taken to Ethiopia, where he exposes Struthers for hogging all the food. Meanwhile, Kenny is murdered by the turkeys, and Marvin is taken back to Ethiopia along with the corpses of the birds. After their son's tragic death, the rest of the McCormicks prepare to feast on a can of green beans but realize they lack a can opener.
9	9	"Mr. Hankey, the Christmas Poo"	Trey Parker & Matt Stone	Trey Parker	December 17, 1997	110	4.55
Sheila protests against the school's Christian Christmas play, complaining that it offends Jewish people. This leads the whole town to abandon the holiday and religion altogether. Kyle feels guilty for the situation and wishes he could be like the other kids. Desperate, he turns to Mr. Hankey, a literal piece of poo in his bathroom, who sings about Noel. Kyle first gets caught with the feces in his hands and later accidentally puts it in Mr. Mackey's coffee mug. The town attempts to put on a religion-free holiday play, during which Cartman exclaims that Sheila is a bitch, sparking war. Kyle is eventually sent to a psychiatric hospital. However, Mr. Hankey finally reveals himself to the town and spreads the spirit of Christmas. Kyle is released from the hospital, and Kenny celebrates the fact that, for once, he didn't die.
10	10	"Damien"	Trey Parker	Trey Parker & Matt Stone	February 4, 1998	108	5.55 3.01 (HH)
As Cartman prepares for his birthday party, a new student named Damien is neglected by the boys due to his violent behavior. In response, Damien turns Kenny into a platypus while Cartman is giving instructions about his gifts and schedules a fight between his father, Satan, and Jesus. At Cartman’s party, Damien gains respect by bullying Pip, and Cartman beats up Kyle for giving him Ants in the Pants as a gift, causing the party to be canceled. Everyone then heads to the much-anticipated fight, where only one person ultimately votes for Jesus. In a twist, that person is Satan, who reveals that he only wanted the money from all the bets placed on his side.
11	11	"Tom's Rhinoplasty"	Trey Parker (uncredited)	Trey Parker	February 11, 1998	111	4.68 2.87 (HH)
Mr. Garrison gets a rhinoplasty and quits teaching to become a model. Stan develops a crush on the substitute teacher, Ms. Ellen (unaware that she is a lesbian), causing classmate Wendy Testaburger to become jealous; soon, Ms. Ellen is discovered to be an Iraqi fugitive and is kidnapped by insurgents to be executed, but it is implied that Wendy may have orchestrated the whole thing.
12	12	"Mecha-Streisand"	Trey Parker	Trey Parker, Philip Stark & Matt Stone	February 18, 1998	112	5.38 3.21 (HH)
Mr. Garrison takes his class on an archaeological dig where Cartman finds a mysterious triangle. Barbra Streisand steals this triangle and becomes Mecha-Streisand, a giant robot that wreaks havoc upon the town.
13	13	"Cartman's Mom Is a Dirty Slut"	Trey Parker	Trey Parker & David R. Goodman	February 25, 1998	113	5.40 3.20 (HH)
Cartman attempts to find his real father, only to find that his mother slept with just about every man in town. Aided by Stan and Kyle, he manages to raise the money for a paternity DNA test after sending a video to America's Stupidest Home Videos.

== Development ==
The idea for South Park originated in 1992 when creators Trey Parker and Matt Stone met in a film class as students at the University of Colorado. They discussed filming a three-minute short film involving a boy who befriended a talking piece of feces named Mr. Hankey. Although such a short was never made, Parker and Stone created a Christmas-related animated short commonly known as "Jesus vs. Frosty". The crude, low-budget animation featured prototypes for the main characters of South Park, including Cartman, Stan and Kyle. Fox executive Brian Graden saw the film and in 1995 sent a check of $1,200 to Parker and Stone asking them to create a second short film that he could send to his friends as a Christmas video card. Titled The Spirit of Christmas, but also known as "Jesus vs. Santa", the short resembled the style of the later series more closely. In 1997, The Spirit of Christmas won the Los Angeles Films Critics Association award for "Best Animation", thus further bringing the two filmmakers to the attention of industry representatives.

The "Jesus vs. Santa" video was widely copied and shared over the Internet. George Clooney was reported to have made 300 copies for his friends, and the short was subsequently regarded as likely the first viral video. The popularity of the short led to Parker and Stone to develop an adult-animated show concept with four children as main protagonists and the fictional town of South Park in the Colorado Rocky Mountains. Through Graden, the duo persuaded Fox to buy their series due to its reputation with primetime edgier shows such as Cops, The Simpsons, and The X-Files. Fox set up a meeting at its office in Century City to discuss with Parker and Stone on how the show would proceed. It did not go well; Fox hated Mr. Hankey being included in the show, as they felt a talking stool character would not fly well with its viewers. Parker and Stone refused to honor Fox's requests to remove the character and completely severed ties with the network as a result.

Later, Comedy Central executive Doug Herzog saw the Jesus vs. Santa short and considered it to be "literally the funniest thing [he]'d ever seen," and requested Parker and Stone to develop a show for his network. During the negotiations, Parker and Stone brought up the idea of a Mr. Hankey episode, with Parker claiming to have asked that "one thing we have to know before we really go any further: how do you feel about talking poo?" The network's executives were receptive to the idea, which would be one of the main reasons Parker and Stone decided to sign on with the channel. At the time, Comedy Central had just lost the rights to their first hit series, Mystery Science Theater 3000, to the SciFi Channel and the only animated series on the network at that point was Dr. Katz, Professional Therapist. The first episode of the series, "Cartman Gets an Anal Probe", debuted on Comedy Central on August 13, 1997, while Mr. Hankey debuted a few months later in the ninth episode, "Mr. Hankey, the Christmas Poo".

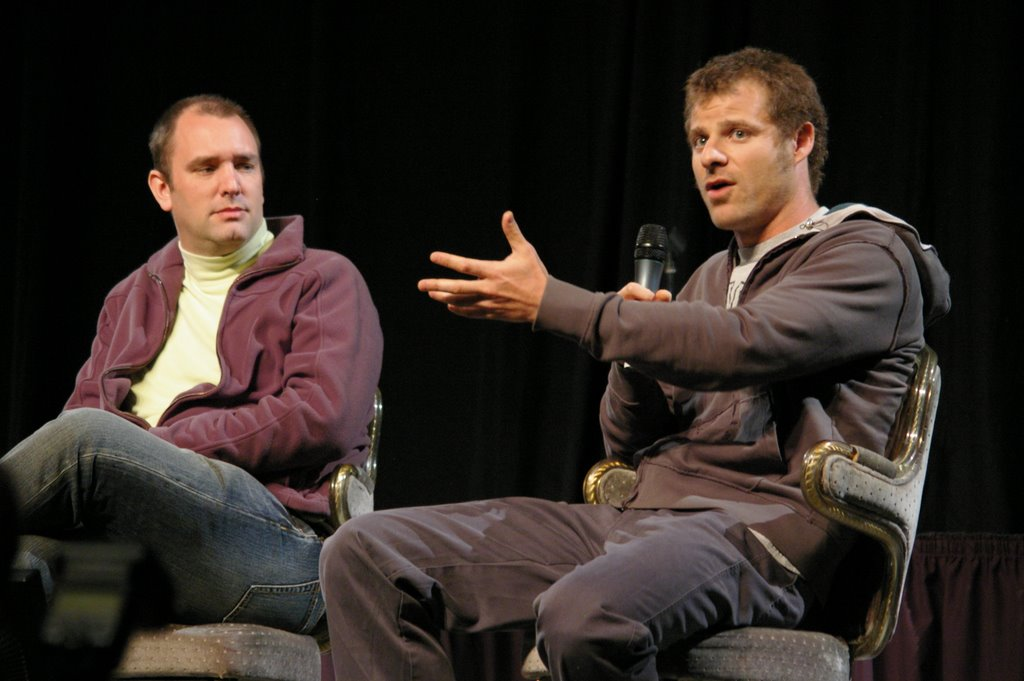
South Park creators Trey Parker and Matt Stone in 2007

The pilot episode received poor results from test audiences. Parker later conceded that regarding the language, he and Stone felt pressure to live up to their previous two shorts and "tried to push things ... maybe further than we should [have]." In contrast, they allowed subsequent episodes to "be more natural", focusing more on making fun of topics considered taboo "without just throwing a bunch of dirty words in there." After the poor results from the test audience, Comedy Central executives were unsure whether they wanted to order additional episodes after "Cartman Gets an Anal Probe". However, when buzz began to generate on the Internet about the two original shorts, the network commissioned Parker and Stone to write one more episode without committing to a full series until they had seen the script. While working on the 1997 film Orgazmo, Parker and Stone wrote the script for what would later become the episode "Weight Gain 4000". The duo sought to give Comedy Central executives an idea of how the series would be and how each episode could differ from the others. The network liked the script, and when Parker and Stone refused to write another script before signing off on at least six episodes, the executives agreed to commit to a series.

Comedy Central originally ordered only these six episodes, but when the show proved successful, they requested an additional seven, which Parker and Stone had to produce quickly. "Pinkeye", the first of these new episodes, would air on October 29, 1997, only two and a half months after the show's premiere. There were three holiday episodes—"Pinkeye", "Starvin' Marvin" and "Mr. Hankey, the Christmas Poo"—which aired at intervals of three weeks, while the remaining four aired later in February 1998.

"Cartman Gets an Anal Probe" was the only episode animated almost completely with traditional cut paper, stop-motion animation techniques. All subsequent episodes would be fully computer-animated using Power Animator or Maya. By the eighth episode, "Damien", much of the drawing and animation responsibilities handled by Parker and Stone were now being delegated to a team of animators. This would be the only episode aside from "Cartman Gets an Anal Probe" to receive a TV-14 (unsuitable for children under the age of 14) rating instead of the show's customary TV-MA (unsuitable for under the age of 17). Parker and Stone credit the fourth episode, "Big Gay Al's Big Gay Boat Ride", with helping to raise the ratings during the early part of the season. They felt that the show's first official Christmas special, "Mr. Hankey, the Christmas Poo", brought South Park to a new level of popularity, and Parker said this episode "just vaulted everything."

== Reception ==
=== Ratings ===
South Park's first season was a ratings success for Comedy Central. "Cartman Gets an Anal Probe" earned a Nielsen rating of 1.3, translating to 980,000 viewers, which was considered high for a cable program in the United States at the time. It increased slightly by the third episode, "Weight Gain 4000", and by the sixth episode, "Death", the show had reached a rating of 1.7. In the releases of "Starvin' Marvin'", "Mr. Hankey, the Christmas Poo" and "Damien", three consecutive episodes, the Nielsen ratings rose: 4.8, 5.2 and 6.4, respectively. Changes in ratings of episodes from "Pinkeye" to "Mecha-Streisand" corresponded to an increase to 5.4 million viewers in 3.2 million households. The season finale, "Cartman's Mom is a Dirty Slut", received a Nielsen rating in the 8.0 range and gained over 300,000 viewers when first aired in Canada in August 1998.

South Park became one of the first television series to be bootlegged via the Internet, just as The Spirit of Christmas had been before it. College students digitized many episodes from the first season and streamed them online for friends who were unable to receive Comedy Central.

=== Critics ===
Despite high ratings, reviews from television critics for the season were mixed. Both The Washington Post and The New York Times had three articles mentioning the show, usually in terms of "class-based taste arguments." "Cartman Gets an Anal Probe", the first episode of the series, received generally negative reviews after airing. Bruce Fretts of Entertainment Weekly thought poorly of the writing and characters, lampooning that "if only the kids' jokes were as fresh as their mouths" and that "it might help if the South Park kids had personalities, but they're as one-dimensional as the show's cut-and-paste animation." Calling the series "sophomoric, gross, and unfunny," Hal Boedeker of the Orlando Sentinel reckoned that the episode made "such a bad impression that it's hard to get on the show's strange wavelength." Tom Shales of The Washington Post considered that "most of the alleged humor on the premiere is self-conscious and self-congratulatory in its vulgarity: flatulence jokes, repeated use of the word 'dildo' (in the literal as well as pejorative sense), and a general air of malicious unpleasantness."

When "Weight Gain 4000" aired, many writers in the mainstream media were still debating the longevity and the overall quality of South Park. With the series still in its earliest stages, the episode continued to shock many due to the characters frequent use of profanities. Nevertheless, several reviewers felt "Weight Gain 4000" was a significant improvement over "Cartman Gets an Anal Probe" and felt that it went in a much more satirical direction. Several media outlets described the fifth episode of the season, "An Elephant Makes Love to a Pig", as one of the most popular early episodes. Tom Carson of Newsday said it was the most outrageous South Park episode until "Mr. Hankey, the Christmas Poo" aired three months later. Many reviewers also said this mere title demonstrated the crudeness and originality of South Park.

Due to its impact, South Park made the cover of Rolling Stone in February 1998, and of Newsweek in March 1998. It was discussed in five different New York Times articles in 1998. Franck Rich of The New York Times mentions the show's "ability to engage political topics with far more success than other (more obviously political) shows" and considered that the show "is hilariously candid about faith, family and death as well" and "is neither politically correct nor incorrect; it's on a different, post-ideological comic map altogether." In 2002, Jeremy Conrad of IGN wrote in a DVD review that it is rare when a television season is "perfect", but "the first season of South Park comes pretty damn close" and that "almost every single episode in this three-disc set is a classic and each is still funny as hell even after so many viewings over the years."

In 2008, scholar Stephen Groening argued that the show appeared as part of a reaction to the culture wars of the 1980s and 1990s in the United States, in which issues such as Murphy Brown's motherhood, Tinky Winky's sexuality, and The Simpsons' family values were extensively debated. The culture wars, and political correctness in particular, were driven by the belief that relativism was becoming more relevant to daily life. Groening explained that South Park "made a name for itself as rude, crude, vulgar, offensive, and potentially dangerous". Its critics argued that the Stan, Kyle, Cartman and Kenny were poor role models for children while its supporters celebrated the show's defense of free speech.

=== Impact on Comedy Central ===
In 2006, Devin Leonard of Fortune regarded that the launch of South Park transformed Comedy Central from a "not-so-funny" network to "a cable industry power almost overnight." The impact the show had ended up surprising everybody involved. At the time, the cable network had a low distribution of just 21 million subscribers. Comedy Central marketed the show aggressively before its launch, billing it as "that's why they invented the V-chip." The resulting buzz led to the network earning an estimated $30 million in T-shirts sales alone before the first episode was even aired.

South Park became immediately one of the most popular shows on cable television, averaging consistently between 3.5 and 5.5 million viewers. The Denver-based Tele-Communications Inc., the largest cable operator in the United States at the time, had just dropped Comedy Central, but when South Park debuted, Denver newspapers and radio stations heavily criticized the operator for not carrying the hit show of the two local filmmakers—Parker and Stone. Doug Herzog, Comedy Central's president at the time, said that the public "went nuts" as the network received about ten million new subscriptions through Tele-Communications Inc. alone, "which at that time was unheard of."

An affiliate of the MTV Network until then, Comedy Central decided, in part due to the success of South Park, to have its own independent sales department. By the end of 1998, Comedy Central had sold more than $150 million worth of merchandise for the show, including T-shirts and dolls. Over the next few years, Comedy Central's viewership spiked largely due to South Park, adding 3 million new subscribers in the first half of 1998 alone and allowed the network to sign international deals with networks in several countries.

=== Awards ===
Some episodes of the first season received nominations for several entertainment awards. The season's fourth episode "Big Gay Al's Big Gay Boat Ride" was nominated for an Emmy Award in 1998 in the "Outstanding Animated Program (for Programming Less Than One Hour)" category but lost to The Simpsons episode "Trash of the Titans". The same episode was also nominated for a GLAAD Award in the "Outstanding TV – Individual Episode" category but lost to another The Simpsons episode, "Homer's Phobia". "Volcano", the season's third episode, was nominated for an Environmental Media Award in the "TV Episodic Comedy" category but ended up losing to another The Simpsons episode, "The Old Man & the Lisa".

During the series first season, South Park won a CableACE Award for "Best Animated Program or Series" and was nominated for an Annie Award in the "Outstanding Achievement in an Animated Primetime or Late Night Television Program" category. In 1998, the two creators of the show Matt Stone and Trey Parker won the "Nova Award" given by the Producers Guild of America for the most promising producers in television.

== Home media ==
South Park – The Complete First Season
DVD Set Details
13 Episodes; 3-disc Set; 1.33:1 Aspect Ratio; Subtitles: English, French, Spanish; English (Dolby Digital 2.0)
Special Features
Episode introductions by Trey Parker and Matt Stone; Cartman "O Holy Night" video; Ned "O Little Town Of Bethlehem" video; Four original television promos; "A South Park Thanksgiving" featured exclusively on The Tonight Show with Jay Leno; The four boys presenting at the 1997 CableACE Awards
Release Dates
Region 1	Region 2	Region 4
November 12, 2002	October 22, 2005	October 4, 2005

Six episodes—"Cartman Gets an Anal Probe", "Weight Gain 4000", "Volcano", "Big Gay Al's Big Gay Boat Ride", "An Elephant Makes Love to a Pig" and "Death"—were released in a three-VHS set on May 5, 1998, marking the first time South Park was made available on video. The first DVD releases came later that year, when the first Thirteen episodes were released by Warner Home Video on October 27 on the compilation collections South Park, Volume 1, Volume 2 and Volume 3. The last episode of the season "Cartman's Mom Is a Dirty Slut" was released on the South Park, Volume 4 on December 14, 1999.

South Park – The Complete First Season was originally released by Warner Home Video as a three-disc region 1 DVD box set in the U.S. on November 12, 2002 and received an MA rating. The season was re-released on June 29, 2005 by Paramount Home Entertainment. The DVD releases featured bonus material such as introductions for each episode, two Christmas carols by Eric Cartman and Ned, a short clip featuring Jay Leno and another clip in which the four boys present at the 1997 CableACE Awards. Trey Parker and Matt Stone produced commentaries for each episode but requested they be pulled off altogether when they found out the commentaries would be edited. Instead, the commentaries were released unedited by Comedy Central on a set of five CDs. In October 2005, South Park: Complete Series 1 was released in Australia and with a 15 rating in region 2. "Mr. Hankey, the Christmas Poo" was released again on November 13, 2005 on the compilation DVD Christmas Time in South Park.

The distribution licenses for six episodes of the South Park's first season ("Volcano", "An Elephant Makes Love to a Pig", "Pinkeye", "Damien", "Starvin' Marvin" and "Mecha-Streisand") were purchased in 2000 by the Pittsburgh, Pennsylvania-based company and website SightSound.com. The site made the episodes available for download for $2.50 for a two-day copy and for $4.95 for a permanent copy. It was one of the first experiments with downloadable television videos, thus making South Park one of the first shows legally obtainable on the Internet. In March 2008, Comedy Central made the first season's episodes as well as almost all other South Park episodes available for legal streaming on the South Park Studios website from within U.S., and later from within Canada and the United Kingdom.

== See also ==
- South Park (Park County, Colorado)
- South Park City
