= Cartman Gets an Anal Probe =

- South Park episode
- Cartman flatulates fire as the anal probe emerges. The episode garnered some controversy for being "self-conscious and self-congratulatory in its vulgarity", with flatulence jokes like the one pictured here made examples.
- Episode no.: Season 1 Episode 1
- Directed by: Trey Parker
- Written by: Trey Parker; Matt Stone
- Production code: 101
- Original air date: August 13, 1997

Episode chronology
← Previous —	Next → "Volcano"
- South Park season 1

"Cartman Gets an Anal Probe" is the series premiere of the American animated television series South Park. It originally aired on Comedy Central in the United States on August 13, 1997. The episode introduces child protagonists Eric Cartman, Kyle Broflovski, Stanley "Stan" Marsh and Kenneth "Kenny" McCormick, who attempt to rescue Kyle's adopted brother Ike from being abducted by aliens.

Part of a reaction to the culture wars of the 1990s in the United States, South Park is deliberately offensive. Much of the show's humor, and of "Cartman Gets an Anal Probe", arises from the juxtaposition of the seeming innocence of childhood and the violent, crude behavior exhibited by the main characters. At the time of the writing of the episode, South Park creators Trey Parker and Matt Stone did not yet have a series contract with Comedy Central. Short on money, they animated the episode using a paper-cutout stop-motion technique, similar to the short films that were the precursors to the series. "Cartman Gets an Anal Probe" remains the only South Park episode animated largely without the use of computer technology.

Despite South Park eventually rising to immense popularity and acclaim, initial reviews of the pilot were generally negative; critics singled out the gratuitous obscenity of the show for particular scorn. Regarding the amount of obscenity in the episode, Parker later commented that they felt "pressure" to live up to the earlier shorts which first made the duo popular. Critics also compared South Park unfavorably with what they felt were more complex, nuanced animated shows, such as The Simpsons and Beavis and Butt-Head.

== Plot ==
As Kyle Broflovski, Stan Marsh, Kenny McCormick, and Eric Cartman wait for the school bus, Kyle's young brother, Ike, tries to follow Kyle to school. Kyle tells Ike he cannot come to school with him. Cartman tells the boys about a dream he had the previous night about being abducted by aliens. The others try to convince him the events did happen and that the aliens are called "visitors", but Cartman refuses to believe them. Chef pulls up in his car and asks if the boys saw the alien spaceship the previous evening, confirming Cartman's "dream", and relays stories of alien anal probes (which Cartman denies he experienced throughout the episode). After Chef leaves, the school bus picks up the boys, and (looking out the back window) they watch in horror as the visitors abduct Ike. Kyle spends the rest of the episode attempting to rescue him.

At school, Cartman begins farting fire, and Kyle unsuccessfully tries to convince their teacher, Mr. Garrison, to excuse him from class to find his brother. When Chef learns that Kyle's brother was abducted and sees a machine emerge from Cartman's anus, he helps the boys escape from school by pulling the fire alarm. Once outside, Cartman reiterates that his abduction was only a dream, when suddenly he is hit by a beam that inexplicably causes him to begin singing and dancing to "I Love to Singa". Soon afterward, a spaceship appears. Kyle throws a stone and the spaceship fires back, propelling Kenny into the road. As he gets back up, he is trampled over by a herd of cows, but survives. A police car then runs Kenny over and kills him.

Stan and Kyle meet Wendy Testaburger at Stark's Pond, where she suggests using the machine lodged inside Cartman to contact the visitors. To lure them back, the children tie Cartman to a tree and, the next time he flatulates, a massive satellite dish emerges from his anus. The alien spaceship arrives and Ike jumps to safety once Kyle asks him to do an impression of "David Caruso's career". In the meantime, the visitors communicate with the cows in the area, having found them to be the most intelligent species on the planet. Cartman is again abducted by the aliens, but is returned to the bus stop the following day with pinkeye.

== Background ==
The origins of South Park date back to 1992, when Trey Parker and Matt Stone, then students at the University of Colorado, created a Christmas-related animated short commonly known as "Jesus vs. Frosty". The low-budget, crudely made animation featured prototypes for the main characters of South Park. Fox Broadcasting Company executive Brian Graden saw the film, and in 1995, he commissioned Parker and Stone to create a second short that he could send to his friends as a video Christmas card. Titled The Spirit of Christmas (also known as "Jesus vs. Santa"), the short more closely resembled the style of the later series. The video was popular and widely shared, both by duplication and over the Internet.

After the shorts began to generate interest for a possible television series, Fox hired Parker and Stone to develop a concept based on the shorts for the network. The duo conceived the series set in the Colorado town of South Park and revolving around the child characters Stan, Kyle, Kenny, and Cartman as main protagonists, and included a talking stool character named Mr. Hankey as one of the minor supporting characters. The inclusion of Mr. Hankey led to disputes between Fox and Parker and Stone, and further disagreements caused the duo to part ways with the network. Later, Comedy Central expressed interests in the series, and Parker and Stone created a pilot episode for the network.

South Park was part of a reaction to the United States culture wars of the 1980s and 1990s, in which issues such as Murphy Brown's motherhood, Tinky Winky's sexuality, and the Simpsons' family values were extensively debated. The culture wars, and political correctness in particular, were driven by the belief that relativism was becoming more relevant to daily life, and thus what were perceived as "traditional" and reliable values were losing their place in American society. South Park, one scholar explains, "made a name for itself as rude, crude, vulgar, offensive, and potentially dangerous" within this debate about values. Its critics argued that Stan, Kyle, Cartman, and Kenny were poor role models for children while its supporters celebrated the show's defense of free speech.

== Production ==
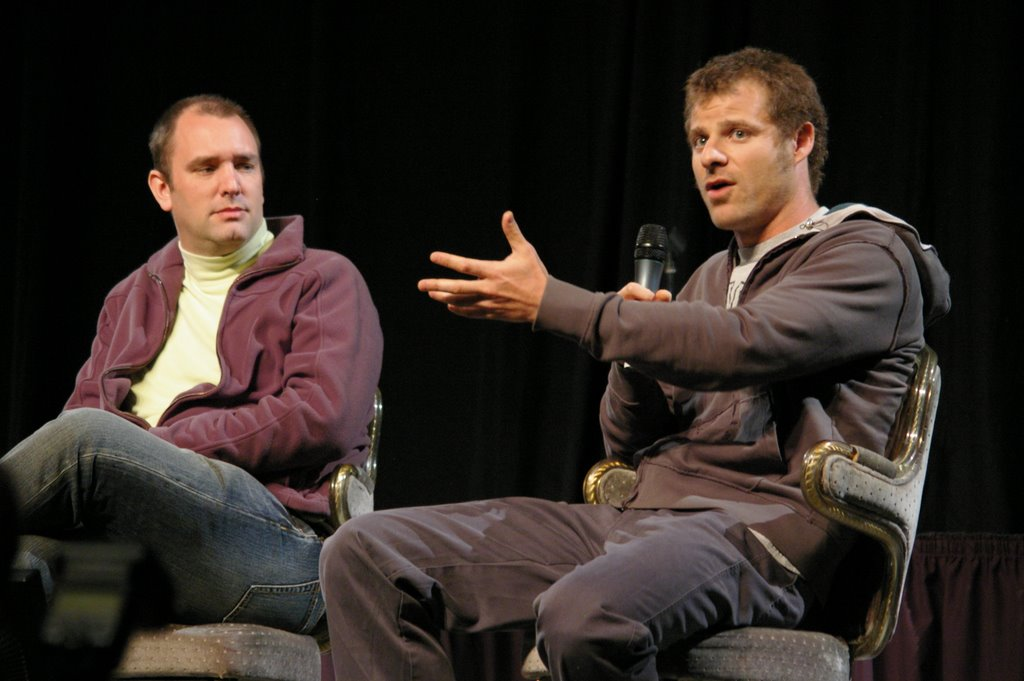
Trey Parker (left) and Matt Stone used cut-paper stop-motion animation over a three-month period to create "Cartman Gets an Anal Probe"

The pilot episode was written by creators Matt Stone and Trey Parker, the latter of whom served as director; it was made on a budget of $300,000. Similarly to Parker and Stone's Christmas shorts, the original pilot was animated entirely with traditional cut-paper stop-motion animation techniques. This laborious process involved creating hundreds of construction paper cutouts—including individual mouth shapes and many of the characters in several different sizes—and photographing every frame of the show with an overhead camera, to the dialogue that had been recorded earlier. Assistants helped with the cutting and pasting of the cutouts, while the animation was primarily done by Parker, Stone and animation director Eric Stough. The episode took about three months to complete, with the animation done in a small room at Celluloid Studios in Denver, Colorado, during the summer of 1996. Additional animation techniques involved creating the starry night sky by putting holes into a black posterboard and illuminating it from behind, and having the pooling of Kenny's blood simulated by drawing an initial dot with a red marker pen, and drawing more to it with every frame. The characters who are not speaking rarely move, which was done to save time in the animation process.

The finished pilot was 28 minutes long, which was too long to air, as Parker and Stone did not realize that more time should be allowed for television commercials during the half-hour spot reserved for an episode on Comedy Central. In order to shorten the episode to 22 minutes, the creators cut out about ten minutes' worth of material and added back another three minutes in order to tie up the changed storyline. For example, in the original pilot, Cartman flatulates fire after some older kids feed him hot tamales, while in the shortened version, he does so because of the alien probe implanted inside him. Other scenes focused more heavily on the character Pip; the scene in the pilot where he is introduced was later reused for the series' fifth episode "An Elephant Makes Love to a Pig", in its original cutout animation form. The storyline additions were created with the use of computer animation, and all subsequent episodes of the series have been computer-animated. While the creators' aim was for the computer animation to visually simulate the cardboard cut-out animation, the techniques were not perfected until later in the series, and as a result, the two styles of animation are easily distinguishable in the pilot. When the episode was re-rendered in HD in 2009 along with all the other episodes made at that point, the computer animated segments were updated to resemble more closely to the original cut-out animation, and are harder to distinguish.

The idea for the town of South Park came from the real Colorado basin of the same name, where the creators said that folklore and news reports originated about "UFO sightings, and cattle mutilations, and Bigfoot sightings". Parker and Stone's original intentions were to have the alien presence feature more frequently in the plots of subsequent episodes, but eventually they decided against this, as they did not want the show to look like a parody of the popular television series The X-Files. However, the crew started hiding aliens in the background in many South Park episodes as Easter eggs for fans, a tradition that goes back to their first major collaboration, the 1993 independent film Cannibal! The Musical.

Regarding the language in the episode, Parker has said that they "felt the pressure to live up to Spirit of Christmas", which contains a lot of obscenities, and as a result, they "tried to push things ... maybe further than we should". In particular, Parker said that they felt the need "to put in dildo and every word we can get away with." In contrast, they allowed subsequent episodes to "be more natural", saying that those episodes are "more about bizarre happenings and making fun of things that are taboo [...] without just throwing a bunch of dirty words in there."

"Cartman Gets an Anal Probe" received poor results from test audiences, and Comedy Central executives were uncertain whether to order additional episodes of the show. However, as the two original Christmas shorts continued to produce Internet buzz, the network paid Parker and Stone to write one more episode. In writing "Weight Gain 4000", the duo sought to give the network an idea of how each episode could differ from the others. The network liked the script and agreed to commit to a series when Parker and Stone said they would not write another individual episode until the network signed off on a season of at least six episodes.

== Themes ==
"You can’t just say, “Hey, fuck you;” ’cause I would just end every scene with Cartman going, "Fuck you, I’m going home," and it would make me laugh, but after a while, it would get old."

— Matt Stone on the language in the show

Cartman, hit by a beam from the spaceship, sings "I Love to Singa". Cut-paper stop-motion animation is conservatively used: the non-speaking figures do not move.

Describing the general tone of the show, Teri Fitsell of The New Zealand Herald explains that "South Park is a vicious social satire that works by spotlighting not the immorality of these kids but their amorality, and contrasting it with the conniving hypocrisy of the adults who surround them." Often compared to The Simpsons and King of the Hill, South Park, according to Tom Lappin of Scotland on Sunday, "has a truly malevolent streak that sets it apart" from these shows; he cites the repeated death of Kenny as an example.

The humor of the show comes from the "disparity" between the "cute" appearance of the characters and their "crude" behavior. However, Parker and Stone said in an early interview that the show's language is realistic. "There are so many shows where little kids are good and sweet, and it's just not real ... Don't people remember what they were like in third grade? We were little bastards." Frederic Biddle of The Boston Globe notes how the show "constantly plays on its grade-school aesthetic for shock value, with great success", arguing that at its height, it is "more a profane 'Peanuts' than a downsized 'Beavis and Butt-Head.'" He points, for example, to Kenny, who symbolically represents the voiceless underclass, which is eliminated in each episode. Claire Bickley of the Toronto Sun explains that "The show captures that mix of innocence and viciousness that can co-exist in kids that age", that "the boys are fascinated by bodily functions", and that they "mimic adult behavior and language". For example, Kyle instructs Stan and Wendy to "make sweet love down by the fire", a phrase he learns from Chef. In a light-hearted study of the humor of flatulence, Jim Dawson explains how the rise of adult animation in the 1990s allowed television to indulge in such humor with The Ren & Stimpy Show, The Simpsons, and Beavis and Butt-Head. Beginning with "Cartman Gets an Anal Probe", South Park builds on this tradition.

The episode employs what literary theorist Mikhail Bakhtin calls the carnivalesque. As Ethan Thompson explains in his article, "Good Demo, Bad Taste: South Park as Carnivalesque Satire", the style consists of four crucial elements: humor, bodily excess, linguistic games that challenge official discourse, and the inversion of social structures. Cartman's body—his obesity and his inability to control his farting—is supposed to exemplify the grotesque. The boys swear throughout the episode, using words and phrases such as "fat ass" and "dildo", challenging the boundaries of appropriate language. Finally, the social structure of the town is inverted, as the episode focuses on the knowledge that the four boys have of the aliens as opposed to the ignorant and incompetent adults. Moreover, the aliens perceive the cows as more intelligent than the humans, inverting the species order.

South Park tends to employ large-scale musical numbers in its episodes, often parodying 1930s cartoons. For example, Cartman sings part of "I Love to Singa", from the cartoon of the same name, when he is struck by a beam from the alien ship.

== Broadcast and reception ==
The episode was broadcast for the first time at 10 pm EDT in the United States on August 13, 1997 on Comedy Central. South Park was originally broadcast during prime time after Seinfeld on Canada's Global TV, with objectionable material cut from the show. The "dildo" jokes were removed from the pilot as well as two scenes in which Kyle kicks his baby brother, Ike. After complaints from viewers, the series was moved to midnight on October 17, 1997 and the deleted material was restored. Almost a year after its original air date, the episode was broadcast for the first time in Britain (outside of satellite television) on July 10, 1998 on Channel 4. A station representative said "It's for the audience coming back from the pub with a curry."

"Cartman Gets an Anal Probe" initially earned a Nielsen rating of 1.3, translating to 980,000 viewers, which is considered high for a cable program in the United States. In April 2007, The New Zealand Herald called the first episode "a huge success"; however, reviews at the time of the episode's broadcast were generally negative, most focusing on the low, obscene comedy. Bruce Fretts of Entertainment Weekly thought poorly of the writing and characters, stating that "If only the kids' jokes were as fresh as their mouths" and "It might help if the South Park kids had personalities, but they're as one-dimensional as the show's cut-and-paste animation". Tim Goodman of The San Francisco Examiner acknowledged that many viewers will find South Park "vile, rude, sick, potentially dangerous, childish and mean-spirited". He argued that viewers "have to come into 'South Park' with a bent for irony, sarcasm, anger and an understanding that cardboard cut-out animation of foul-mouthed third-graders is a tragically underused comic premise."

Calling the series "sophomoric, gross, and unfunny", Hal Boedeker of the Orlando Sentinel believed that this episode "makes such a bad impression that it's hard to get on the show's strange wavelength." Similarly, Miles Beller of The Hollywood Reporter called it "a witless offering that wants to score as it seeks to be pointedly outrageous and aggressively offensive but clocks in as merely dumb." Ann Hodges of the Houston Chronicle considered the show "made by and for childish grown-ups" and for "adults who enjoy kid shows". Seeing the show as the inheritor of The Simpsons and Beavis and Butt-Head, Ginia Bellafante of Time noted its failure to cohere and considered the show "devoid of subtext". Caryn James of The New York Times commented that the series "succeeds best in small touches" but "seems to have a future". In a generally negative review of the first three episodes of the series, Tom Shales of The Washington Post wrote that "Most of the alleged humor on the premiere is self-conscious and self-congratulatory in its vulgarity: flatulence jokes, repeated use of the word 'dildo' (in the literal as well as pejorative sense) and a general air of malicious unpleasantness." In one of the few generally positive reviews, Eric Mink of the Daily News praised the South Park universe and the "distinct, interesting characters" within it. He singled out Cartman, calling him "the most vibrant of the bunch", and describing him as "a bitter old man living in an 8-year-old's body".

== Home media ==
"Cartman Gets an Anal Probe" was first released on video on May 5, 1998, as part of the three-volume VHS set, which included humorous introductions to each show by Parker and Stone. The episode, along with the other twelve from the first season, was also included in the DVD release South Park: The Complete First Season, which was released on November 12, 2002. Parker and Stone recorded commentary tracks for each episode, but they were not included with the DVDs due to "standards" issues with some of the statements; Parker and Stone refused to allow the tracks to be edited and censored, so they were released in a CD completely separate from the DVDs. Like some episodes of South Park, "Cartman Gets an Anal Probe" is available to watch for free on the show's website, SouthParkStudios.com. The HD print of this episode retains the original 4:3 aspect ratio instead of "re-rendering" it in 16:9 widescreen.

The original, unaired version of the pilot had seen only limited release. It was released on a DVD in 2003, which was made available by pre-ordering "South Park: The Complete Second Season" through Best Buy in the United States. The back cover of this release features a description of the unaired pilot by South Park animation director Eric Stough. In 2009, the unaired pilot was made available for free online viewing for a limited time of 30 days at the show's official website. During this time, the site also featured a version of the pilot with audio commentary by Eric Stough and South Park Studios creative director Chris Brion. The unaired pilot has also been shown publicly at certain venues, such as The US Comedy Arts Festival (now called The Comedy Festival) in Aspen, Colorado, in 1998, and at Comic-Con in San Diego in 2011 as part of the "Year of the Fan" 15th-anniversary promotion of South Park.

== See also ==
- "Cancelled", an episode in the seventh season relating back to this episode
