= South Park 10: The Game =

2007 video game

- Title screen for South Park 10: The Game
- Developer: Mr.Goodliving
- Publisher: RealNetworks
- Platform: Mobile phones
- Release: March 28, 2007
- Genre: Action
- Mode: Single-player

South Park 10: The Game is a mobile game based on the animated television series South Park. The game was developed by Mr.Goodliving, published by RealNetworks and was released on 28 March 2007. The game is a standard platform game with abilities to pick up objects and use them to reach heights. Most of the moves are exclusive to each playable character in the game. The game was released after the television conclusion of South Park season 10 in November 2006.

== Gameplay ==
South Park 10: The Game features ten stages, each stage based upon one episode from each season (one up to ten), each stage is made up of three levels and one bonus level unlocked by collecting a certain amount of Cheesy Poofs.
