= Maya the Bee & Her Friends =

1999 video game

- German Game Boy Color cover
- Developer: Crawfish Interactive
- Publisher: Acclaim Entertainment
- Producers: Tim Bradstock; Douglas Yellin
- Designers: Tim Bradstock; Kevin McMahon
- Programmer: David Theodore
- Artists: Terry Ford; Emma Denson
- Composer: Tim Follin
- Series: Maya the Bee
- Platforms: Game Boy, Game Boy Color
- Release: 1999
- Genre: Platformer
- Mode: Single-player

Maya the Bee & Her Friends is a 1999 platformer video game developed by British studio Crawfish Interactive for the Game Boy and the Game Boy Color. It is the first game based on Maya the Bee.

The game reuses the engine sourced from a cancelled South Park game which Crawfish Interactive were developing for Acclaim in 1998. The game was also reskinned and released as The New Adventures of Mary Kate & Ashley in North America to tie in with the Mary-Kate and Ashley Olsen media franchise.

== Gameplay ==
The game features over 120 levels. Each of the levels include a number of tricky puzzles that must be solved before the players can rescue one of their insect-friends, trapped behind a spider's web. The players can control three insects, each possessing different abilities. For example, Maya is the only character able to pull switches and Flip allows the characters to leap to higher places.

== Reception ==
IGN rated the game a 6/10. Total! rated the game 2/6 while praising the music and tricky puzzles but thought the graphics were "boring".

== Sources ==
- Bickham, Alex (1999). "MAYA THE BEE AND HER FRIENDS". Planet Game Boy. No. 1. Future plc.
