= South Park Let's Go Tower Defense Play! =

2009 video game

- The game's cover art, showing the four boys on the right, and enemy characters on the left.
- Developer: Doublesix
- Publisher: Microsoft Game Studios
- Director: Jim Mummery
- Artists: Tanguy Dewavrin; Nader Alikhani
- Composer: Jamie Dunlap
- Platform: Xbox Live Arcade
- Release: October 7, 2009
- Genres: Tower defense, action
- Modes: Single-player, multiplayer

South Park Let's Go Tower Defense Play! is a 2009 video game based on the American animated television series South Park, released on the Xbox Live Arcade service for the Xbox 360 video game console. The game was developed by Doublesix in collaboration with South Park Digital Studios and Xbox Live Productions. South Park Let's Go Tower Defense Play! is a tower defense game, with the added element of being a fast-paced action game as well. Thus, players do not only build towers to eliminate destructive forces, but they also have to control multiple characters in order to successfully protect the town of South Park. South Park Let's Go Tower Defense Play! is the first South Park video game released after three early titles released between 1998 and 2000.

== Gameplay ==
Like in other tower defense games players must destroy waves of enemies using towers strategically placed around a path. In addition players can directly control a character to directly attack the enemies and collect dropped coins in order to buy and place down more towers. In single player, the player switches between each character, whilst multiplayer assigns characters to each player.

== Plot ==
Cartman runs over to Stan's house to warn him that 'horrible beings' are attacking South Park. The two are able to defend the household from an army of Ginger Kids and Cows before picking up Kyle and running to their school. Once again, they manage to protect the area, but Cartman receives a phone call from Kenny, who is under attack. After helping Kenny fight off another horde of enemies, the boys deduce that the one responsible for the mayhem can only be an evil supervillain: Professor Chaos.

The boys reach Butters' house and confront Chaos, but he claims that his only evil plan was "to replace all the healthy vitamin water in the pharmacy with boring old regular water". During a battle with another group of enemies, one of Butters' testicles is shattered, so the boys take him to Hell's Pass Hospital and protect it while he is being healed. Jimmy runs in to tell the boys to head to Stark's Pond, where they help Jimbo and Ned stop another group of enemies from destroying the town. Craig directs them to the lair of the 6th Graders, led by Scott Tenorman, who have been recruited by the sinister evil that looms over the town.

After defeating Scott and the 6th Graders, Clyde tells the gang to help Mr. Lu Kim defend the Great Wall of South Park from an army of Mongolians. After a long battle, the boys and Lu Kim are victorious, but only before being redirected once again, this time to the South Park Docks, by Tweek.

The boys defend the Docks from a group of enemies led by General Disarray. After doing so, Pip attempts to reveal the villain's identity to the boys, but, typically, they reject him before he is able to finish his sentence. The boys head up high into the mountains above South Park to meet Randy, who tells them that they are about to be attacked. They are able to stop ManBearPig and a mass of Demons from taking over the geology building, before Timmy comes to meet them and they are directed one final time to Downtown South Park. Randy confirms that they must head Downtown to stop the villain, and warns the boys that "he has always been waiting" for them.

The boys stop a huge army of assorted enemies from destroying the town hall before a voice announces 'Game Over' and the game world collapses. After the boys are pulled out into a world beyond the Universe, the villain is revealed to be the Japanese Announcer (who provides voice-overs during gameplay), who has been manipulating South Park and using the boys as pawns. The Announcer then attacks South Park and attempts to storm the town hall himself, but the boys are able to defeat him. Without an ultimate villain controlling South Park, the evil forces disappear and everything returns to normal.

== Development ==
After the early success of South Park, three video games based on the show have been released by Acclaim Entertainment: South Park (1998), South Park: Chef's Luv Shack (1999), and South Park Rally (2000). South Park creators Trey Parker and Matt Stone had little to do with the development of these early titles, and have publicly criticized Acclaim and the quality of the games. Directors and producers of South Park Let's Go Tower Defense Play! also criticized the previous games as being "disappointing", and for the 3D titles not having the look and feel of the simplistic, "crude and sloppy" cutout animation-based style of South Park. Work on South Park Let's Go Tower Defense Play! started after forming a small group called South Park Digital Studios in late 2007, whose aim was to work on projects related to South Park, except for the TV show itself. Creative Director Brion Chris said that when starting to develop the game, the team's "biggest hurdle to overcome was the bad taste the early South Park video games left in our collective mouths." Parker and Stone were involved in the creation of SPLGTDP from the beginning.

South Park Let's Go Tower Defense Play! was developed in collaboration with three studios. The majority of the development on the game was done by the British studio Doublesix, while Microsoft Game Studios also had artists and programmers working on the game, and provided additional work on the project, including improvements based on Usability Research. South Park Digital Studios brought their expertise of working on the show for 13 seasons, and were in charge of the script, content, and quality control. The team constantly reviewed several aspect of the game, including every graphical asset created for it outside the South Park Studios. South Park Digital Studios also helped in setting the style of and creating the different towers available in the game, which are designed to have the appearance of having been put together by the kids, from various materials lying around.

Most of the game's art assets were provided by South Park Digital Studios. New cutscenes were created, in a style that is both true to the show's look, and to the Anime-inspired look of the game. The dialogue in the game features both archive recordings from the show's past seasons, as well as new lines recorded by the original voice talent of the show; mainly creators Trey Parker and Matt Stone. New original music was composed and produced by South Park composer Jamie Dunlap.

As South Park is often controversial in both its subject matter and language use, certain decisions were considered about both the content featured in the game, and its title. While most content was left in the game unaltered, including many short clips from the episodes of the show, some cuts were made specifically for the Japanese Microsoft team, for the game to be available for release in Japan. The title for the game went through several iterations. The original title for the game was South Park: Suck My Balls, but was done away after considering how to censor its title with asterisks on Microsoft's Xbox Live Marketplace service. The next idea was to name the game Snowballin', alluding to the snowball-fighting nature of the game, while also referring to the sexual practice. Another title considered for the game was the pseudo-Japanese sounding Baru Baru Suki Suki. After all of these were refused as unacceptable titles for the game, it was decided to name it South Park Let's Go Tower Defense Play!, which fit in with "the Japanese animation-style feel" of the game. (Note: The occasional usage of incorrect English phrasing in Japanese popular culture, along with the phrase "let's go", were parodied in a song in the Anime-centric South Park episode "Good Times with Weapons".) Other problematic issues involved the names of the game's Achievements, which are all references to the series. Achievements are publicly visible outside of the game, and there are restrictions on the names and images that can be used in them. Rejected Achievements included the drug-related phrase "Chasing the Dragon" (Note: "Chasing the dragon" refers to the elusive pursuit of the ultimate high in the usage of some particular drug. A gag in the South Park episode "Guitar Queer-O" showed an addictive video game called Heroin Hero, in which the character does nothing but inject himself with heroin while literally chasing a dragon that cannot be caught, only chased. The final version of South Park Let's Go Tower Defense Play! does include an Achievement called "Come On. Catch Me.", referring to this scene of the show.) and "Stupid Spoiled Whore". Another Achievement was to be titled "How to Eat with Your Butt", but buttocks are not allowed to be shown on the service.

== Release and reception ==
Reception

Aggregate score
Aggregator	Score
Metacritic	72/100

Review scores
Publication	Score
GameSpot	7.5/10
IGN	7.0/10

Award
Publication	Award
Spike Video Game Awards	Best Game Based on a Movie or TV Show (2009)

The game was first mentioned at the 2008 Electronic Entertainment Expo (E3), and was later revealed with its final title at Comic-Con 2009. It was released on October 7, 2009, the day the second half of the show's thirteenth season premiered. In October 2009, as part of Xbox Live's "Game with Fame" promotion, players were able to play with series co-creator Matt Stone, and other South Park Studios employees online.

GameSpot gave the game a 7.5 out of 10 saying "A great sense of humor and challenging gameplay make Let's Go Tower Defense Play! easily the best South Park game to date." IGN gave the game a 7.0 out of 10 because of the story, non-stop nostalgia, and having the game have more of a multiplayer focus, making the game frustrating for solo gamers. At the 2009 Spike Video Game Awards, the game was awarded the "Best Game Based on a Movie or TV Show" award. GamesRadar called it the tenth best tower defense in the video games history, saying "With strong multiplayer and plenty of crude, foul-mouthed humor, it was the first to prove that Stan, Kyle, Cartman, and Kenny could find a real home in gaming."
