= South Park: Snow Day! =

2024 video game

- Developer: Question (Note: The Nintendo Switch version was developed by Mi'pu'mi Games with assistance from Zeppelin Studio.)
- Publisher: THQ Nordic
- Director: Christopher Brion
- Producer: Todd Benson
- Designer: Kenneth Strickland
- Programmer: Kain Shin
- Artists: Jacob Glaser; Stephen Alexander
- Writers: Trey Parker; Jameel Saleem; Matt Stone; Jolie Menzel; Xalavier Nelson Jr.
- Composers: Jamie Dunlap; Exiquio Talavera
- Engine: Unreal Engine 4
- Platforms: Nintendo Switch; PlayStation 5; Windows; Xbox Series X/S
- Release: March 26, 2024
- Genres: Action-adventure, beat 'em up, roguelike
- Modes: Single-player, multiplayer

South Park: Snow Day! is a 2024 action-adventure video game developed by Question in association with South Park Digital Studios and published by THQ Nordic. It is based on the animated television series South Park and takes place after the events of the previous video games South Park: The Stick of Truth (2014) and South Park: The Fractured but Whole (2017). The game was released for Nintendo Switch, PlayStation 5, Windows, and Xbox Series X/S on March 26, 2024. It received mixed reviews from critics towards the change in art style, writing and humor, and criticism towards the gameplay, toned-down content, and short length.

== Gameplay ==
South Park: Snow Day! centers around the four main characters—Eric Cartman, Stan Marsh, Kyle Broflovski, and Kenny McCormick—participating in snow-based fights and activities, with players assuming the role of a player-created character named The New Kid (as with the previous games The Stick of Truth, Phone Destroyer, and The Fractured but Whole).

After completing the tutorial, the player is placed in a small hub world, in which the population resides in Kupa Keep in Cartman's backyard. The player can interact with characters such as Cartman in which missions are selected, Mr. Hankey, who takes dark matter (actually feces) as currency to improve the player's perks through a skill tree, which can also be swapped to accommodate the player's preferences, Butters Stotch who keeps a record of cards found throughout the game, Tolkien Black who maintains the armory where the player can select weapons and abilities, and Tweek Tweak and Craig Tucker who maintain the Bazaar, where the player can purchase emotes or cosmetics with platinum points.

Once a mission is selected, the player must select a card that can improve abilities depending on their loadout, as well as a Bullshit card, that would give the players major advantages. Enemies will also have cards set before missions start. Arenas contain multiple chests that can carry Cheesy Poofs for healing, toilet paper that can be used as currency to upgrade cards, dark matter, and upgrades to preexisting cards. In combat, enemies will attack throughout the map, and occasionally use Bullshit cards placed at the start of the level. Jimmy Valmer will be found after each combat section and offer other cards or upgrades to those cards by transacting toilet paper before the player heads off to the next arena. Henrietta Biggle can also be found in places across the arenas to give players Tarot cards that can replenish Bullshit cards or hand out currency among other things. After completing the main story, Nichole Daniels will inform the player of Infernal Pacts, where they can find her during missions, and accept additional multipliers to make the mission harder, which lead to rewards if they survive.

== Plot ==
Eric Cartman comes home during an intense blizzard, excited over the prospect of a day off from school, while his mother, Liane, is shocked by the damage and casualties reported on the news. At night, Cartman prays to God for a snow day, and in the morning, the news states that all Park County schools are to be closed. Afterwards, he jubilantly goes outside and tells everyone, including the New Kid, to get outside and play. Once everyone is in their fantasy costumes, Cartman tells the New Kid that he and the boys have created a new set of rules after the New Kid became too powerful the last two times, but due to disagreements with how they are implemented and interpreted, the town's children are at war with each other over which version of the rules are best. Cartman also mentions how Clyde Donovan has information about how the elves, led by Kyle Broflovski, are planning to attack Kupa Keep and tells the New Kid to investigate with three other New Kids. During the quest, the New Kid's party discovers Randy Marsh has been frozen at Stark's Pond. After getting him out, he informs the party of Kyle's whereabouts, and they head into the forest to battle him. After Kyle is defeated, Cartman questions him at Kupa Keep on why he was planning the attack. Kyle denies this and states that he was planning to talk to Stan Marsh, who he suspects to be responsible for the blizzard.

Cartman sends the New Kid to Stan's Marshwalker territory, but Stan has obtained a powerful axe in a quest, and instantly defeats the New Kid. This leads to Cartman insisting on putting the New Kid on a quest to find the same power that Stan has. After a fight with Kenny McCormick, the New Kid meets with Jimbo Kern and Ned Gerblansky, who are trying to fend off townspeople who are desperate for food and toilet paper. Jimbo agrees to help the New Kid who is to find several items desired by the townspeople. Other quests involve lighting braziers in SoDoSoPa, and stealing porn from sixth graders, who almost run over the New Kid's party with a snow plow. Eventually, the New Kid becomes powerful enough to fight Stan, who gets help from his father, Randy, who works cannons at his fortress in order to keep toilet paper from getting stolen, and defeats him. As Randy begs the New Kid's party not to take any toilet paper, Stephen Stotch runs in and takes it from him. Stan later reveals at Kupa Keep that he had access to dark matter from Mr. Hankey, who became vengeful after being banished from the town over his offensive tweets in the events of "The Problem with a Poo".

Cartman, being faced with the prospect of the blizzard's end which means returning to school, betrays the New Kid and brainwashes the townspeople through dark matter-infused hot chocolate. The New Kid's Party chases Cartman through the town's backyards and by the Church where they defeat brainwashed adults including Liane. In the forest, Cartman summons a snow clone named Balrog and fights. After being defeated by the New Kid, Cartman decides to join the fight against Mr. Hankey, and heads off with the boys to Hell's Pass Hospital which Mr. Hankey has turned into a fortress. Once they arrive to the top, Mr. Hankey absorbs the New Kid's dark matter, turns into a giant worm named Scheisse-Hulud (Note: Scheisse is "Shit" in German, and Hulud is a reference to the Sandworms known as "Shai-Hulud" in Dune) and fights the boys in a forest, but is eventually defeated with toilet paper cannons, ending the blizzard. As the snow melts, and Cartman reflects on having to go back to school, Jesus arrives to express disappointment towards the boys for not forgiving Mr. Hankey. The boys go to a toilet in Kyle's house and apologize to Mr. Hankey for abandoning him, in which he quickly forgives them. The boys ask for one more snow day and Mr. Hankey obliges, putting the town in another blizzard immediately after.

== Development and release ==
Developer Question became acquainted with South Park Studios after they financed Question's previous game, The Blackout Club in 2019; the company's founder Jordan Thomas had previously worked with Trey Parker and Matt Stone on the South Park role-playing video games. In 2021, Stone and Parker signed a $900 million development deal with ViacomCBS, with one of the projects announced being a new 3D South Park game in development. In August 2022, the game was teased at THQ Nordic's digital showcase by a small teaser featuring a clip of Randy Marsh's voice exclaiming "Hot! Hot-hot-hot!", taken from the episode "More Crap" (2007). In August 2023, South Park: Snow Day! was officially announced for Nintendo Switch, PlayStation 5, Windows, and Xbox Series X/S.

In an interview with Stone, IGN likened the gameplay to that of a "roguelike". Stone remarked on the deviations from the series' previous RPG iterations, stating, "We always thought we wanted to do that thing where we do a thing in a show and then like, it's in the game two weeks later, or three weeks, or whatever it is." He also remarked the change from 2D to 3D allowed the development team more flexibility in how they built the game world, saying that creating a game on a 2D plane is "really, really hard when you think about what you have to work with."

=== Post-release content ===
Downloadable content has been made since the game's release. Free DLC includes cosmetics and two game modes, To Danse with Ravenous Shadows and To Danse with the Veiled Horde, as well as a season pass with additional cosmetics, new weapons and cards, and a new game mode called Nichole's Home Brew.

== Reception ==
Reception

Aggregate score
Aggregator	Score
Metacritic	(PC) 59/100 (PS5) 52/100 (XSXS) 50/100 (NS) 60/100

Review scores
Publication	Score
Digital Trends	1.5/5 stars
Famitsu	27/40
IGN	3/10
Nintendo Life	4/10 stars
PCGamesN	6/10
Push Square	6/10 stars
Shacknews	8/10
The Guardian	3/5 stars
Video Games Chronicle	3/5 stars
VideoGamer.com	5/10

South Park: Snow Day! received "mixed or average" reviews from critics, according to review aggregator website Metacritic. In Japan, four critics from Famitsu gave the game a total score of 27 out of 40.

IGN reviewer Travis Northup called the game "dull, toothless, and a big step in the wrong direction for South Park". He criticized the combat for being repetitive and believed that the humor and shock value were lacking.

Kotaku writer Zack Zwiezen took issue with the 3D art style stating it "often, ironically, looks cheaper and cruder than the papercraft style of the beloved series." The Kotaku review also noted a lack of humor and dialogue, citing an over reliance on grunt and pain noises in fights. Like other reviews, it also took aim at the combat, calling it "imprecise and floaty" and "dull".

Game Rant’s review negatively compared the game to its predecessors The Stick of Truth and The Fractured but Whole, stating that it was "destined to live in their shadows". The review stated elements of the greater South Park universe were underutilized, such as side characters that could have had expanded roles in the snow setting and settings from the town itself that went unexplored. Like other reviews, it went on to criticize the combat mechanics and humor execution. The review’s author pointed to the limited amount of combat weapon combinations and an over reliance on toilet humor compared to its predecessors which, while also using toilet jokes, had "more range in displaying that beloved, crude South Park humor."

Nintendo Life writer Jamie Ditchfield noted that technical issues made the game difficult to play on Switch, and also criticized the game's writing. Particularly about the humor, Nintendo Life said there were "hardly any memorable comedic moments to reference, something we'd never expect to say when talking about South Park of all things." Ditchfield concluded that the game had "a lot of potential with some of its roguelike-inspired mechanics but ultimately fails to deliver an engaging experience whether you're playing it solo or in co-op.", and gave it a four out of ten.

Video Game Chronicle gave the game three stars, and praised the 3D cut scenes, voice acting, writing, and music, finding that the game feels "authentically South Park". However, the review noted that the similar feeling snow environments, coupled with only having five stages available at launch, made the game feel repetitive and light on content.

=== Sales ===
In its debut week, South Park: Snow Day! was the third best selling game of that week in the United Kingdom.

THQ Nordic's parent company Embracer Group described the game's sales as meeting expectations in its 2024 fiscal year-end report.

== See also ==
- List of South Park video games
