= South Park (pinball) =

1999 pinball machine

- Manufacturer: Sega Pinball
- Release date: February 1999
- System: Sega WhiteStar
- Players: 6
- Design: Joe Balcer and Joe Kaminkow
- Programming: Neil Falconer, Orin Day
- Artwork: Dave Link and Jason Dominiak
- Mechanics: Joe Balcer, Rob Hurtado
- Music: Kyle Johnson
- Sound: Kyle Johnson
- Production run: 2,200 (estimated)

South Park is a 1999 pinball machine based on the American adult animated sitcom of the same name and released by Sega Pinball.

This game was Sega's last pinball machine; production would be continued by Stern Pinball, the successor to Sega Pinball.

== Features ==
=== Aesthetics ===
Inlanes light up and can start Super Fart Bumpers. Outlanes can be lit for special. There are three standard bumpers, the left lane is a shot through the bumpers. Targets are located on each left lane entrance side. There are also 8 townsfolk targets. Minor characters include Mr. Hankey located in front of the toilet. Major characters include Chef, a large rubber Kenny, Kyle, Stan, and Cartman. There is also a Cartman hole. Scoreboard includes various character graphics and sounds.

=== Character modes ===
In total, there are five character-related missions which the individual player must complete. The main goal in South Park is to complete the Stan, Kyle, Cartman, Kenny, and Chef mode in order to unlock the secret wizard modes. In order to start a character mode, the player must hit each individual character's slot (or shot) a certain number of times. After a successful completion, the number of shots it takes to activate the next character mode will increase, making it more difficult to activate. Character modes can be replayed regardless of completion.

=== Censorship ===
The game's age-appropriate content level can be adjusted between two settings: "PG-13" mode (which features mild language, bleeped-out expletives and bathroom humor), and the family-friendly "G" mode (which eliminates all profanity and bathroom humor). For example, on the former setting, Kyle will utter "you bastards" after a successful "Kill Kenny" hurry up mode, which is replaced with "Rats!" in the latter setting. The family mode will also alter the match sequence which features Terrance & Phillip belching instead of farting.

The prototype ROM set for the game originally had all expletives unbleeped.

== Digital tables ==
Fifteen years after the release of the original South Park pinball table, Zen Studios collaborated with South Park Digital Studios to develop and release a new virtual pinball adaptation of South Park as a paid mobile app (for iOS and Android) and an add-on for Zen Pinball 2 and Pinball FX 2, along with a bonus table, Butters' Own Pinball Game, based on the character Butters Stotch. Titled South Park: Super Sweet Pinball, the virtual South Park pinball table is not based on the physical Sega Pinball South Park table. Adult humor and explicit language are not part of both tables, thus making the South Park Pinball pack the first and only South Park video game to be rated Everyone 10+ by the ESRB.

Due to licensing issues, the Zen Studios South Park pinball tables were excluded from Pinball FX 3, the joint sequel to Zen Pinball 2 and Pinball FX 2, and the mobile version is currently no longer available for purchase. The tables were remastered for Pinball FX, the fourth pinball game by Zen, on October 12, 2023.
