= Mr.Goodliving =

Former Finnish mobile game developer

- Type: Private (subsidiary of RealNetworks)
- Industry: Video games
- Founded: 1999
- Headquarters: Helsinki, Finland
- Website: www.mrgoodliving.com

Mr.Goodliving Ltd. was a Finnish video game developer and a video game publisher based in Helsinki, Finland. It was founded in 1999, and acquired by RealNetworks on 6 May 2005. Mr.Goodliving was focused on games for mobile phones, the iPhone and other high-end portable devices.

The company was best known for the casual sports game franchise Playman Sports, spanning numerous incarnations such as Playman Summer Games, Playman Winter Games and Playman World Soccer. Along with original intellectual property, the company worked with several high-profile licenses such as Trivial Pursuit, South Park, Scrabble, and the Vancouver 2010 Olympic Winter Games.

In addition to its games, Mr.Goodliving developed EMERGE, a proprietary development platform which enables rapid and scalable publishing of games to more than 2000 handsets in 20 languages.

On February 9, 2011, RealNetworks unexpectedly announced the closure of Mr.Goodliving.
