= The Spirit of Christmas (short films) =

1992 and 1995 animated short films directed by Trey Parker and Matt Stone

The Spirit of Christmas is the title given to two stop-motion animated short films created by the duo Trey Parker and Matt Stone. The films, animated with cutout animation, were respectively released in 1992 and 1995 and form the basis for the animated series South Park, with the latter short featuring more established depictions of the series' setting and characters. To differentiate between them, they have been retroactively referred to as Jesus vs. Frosty and Jesus vs. Santa. A clip of both films appears on two respective billboards during the opening sequence for South Park's first four seasons (prior to the fourth season episode "Fourth Grade").

== 1992 film (Jesus vs. Frosty) ==
Jesus vs. Frosty
- The boys place a "magic hat" on Frosty.
- Directed by: Trey Parker; Matt Stone
- Written by: Trey Parker; Matt Stone
- Produced by: Trey Parker; Matt Stone
- Starring: Trey Parker; Matt Stone
- Edited by: Trey Parker; Matt Stone
- Music by: Trey Parker; Matt Stone
- Production company: Avenging Conscience
- Distributed by: University of Colorado
- Release date: December 8, 1992
- Running time: 4 minutes 4 seconds
- Country: United States
- Language: English

=== Plot ===
In South Park, Colorado, 1992, a group of four 10-year-old boys are building their own Frosty the Snowman, and in the spirit of the song, use a "magic" top hat to bring him to life, despite the warnings of one of the boys. The snowman quickly develops a psychopathic disposition, proceeding to kill one of the boys, Kenny, to the other boys' shock.

The boys seek aid from what appears to be Santa Claus. He reveals himself to be Frosty and kills another of the boys, who shares an appearance to the final version of Kenny. The two remaining boys run away toward a Nativity scene. Jesus emerges from the scene and defeats Frosty by slicing off his hat with his halo. After Jesus returns to the scene, the two boys realize the purported "true" meaning of Christmas: presents. A goat sniffs on Kenny and the hooded boy's corpses, as the boys return to their homes to find presents hidden by their parents.

=== Production ===
In 1992, Parker and Stone created The Spirit of Christmas while attending the University of Colorado under the Avenging Conscience moniker. Prior to this, Parker and Stone ran camera tests, during which they made impressions of children's voices, which were later used in South Park. Near the end of the semester, Parker conceived The Spirit of Christmas after watching a series of films with Stone. The film, created with construction paper and filmed with an old 8 mm film camera, premiered during the December 1992 student film screening. The film features four children very similar in appearance the four main characters of South Park, only Kyle and Kenny are named in the short. This Kenny shares South Park's Kenny McCormick's running gag of dying.

The film is referenced in the season six episode "Simpsons Already Did It". In the episode, Tweek Tweak is reluctant to complete a snowman out of fear that it will come to life and kill him, to which Stan replies, "Dude, when has that ever happened except for that one time?"

== 1995 film (Jesus vs. Santa) ==
Jesus vs. Santa
- Santa and Jesus battle each other.
- Directed by: Trey Parker; Matt Stone
- Written by: Trey Parker; Matt Stone
- Produced by: Trey Parker; Matt Stone; Brian Graden
- Starring: Trey Parker; Matt Stone
- Edited by: Trey Parker; Matt Stone
- Music by: Trey Parker; Matt Stone
- Production company: Krankin/Blass Productions
- Release date: December 1, 1995
- Running time: 5 minutes 12 seconds
- Country: United States
- Language: English
- Budget: $750

=== Plot ===
The boys are singing "We Wish You A Merry Christmas" until Stan points out that Kyle is Jewish. Kyle then starts to sing the "Dreidel Song", but is mocked by Stan and Cartman. Their arguing is interrupted when Jesus appears, asking them to lead him to the mall, where they find Santa Claus.

Jesus is angry with Santa because he feels he ruins the memory of Jesus' birthday with his presents. Santa, insistent that Christmas is a time for giving, rouses Jesus into fighting him, claiming that "there can be only one". Their fight causes large-scale destruction that kills various bystanders, including Kenny. Jesus pins Santa down, and each of them asks the boys to help them. The boys hesitate and wonder, "What would Brian Boitano do?" Boitano appears before the boys and delivers a speech about how Christmas should be about being good to one another. The boys tell the fighters of Boitano's message, and they apologize to each other in shame. They thank the boys for helping them and forgive each other. The boys realize that the true meaning of Christmas is presents, and Kyle remarks that Jewish children receive presents for eight days during Hanukkah. Intrigued, the other boys decide to become Jews as well, and the three leave the scene as rats gather near Kenny's corpse again.

=== Production ===
In 1995, after seeing the 1992 film, Fox executive Brian Graden commissioned Parker and Stone to create a similar film as a video Christmas card that he could send to friends. The short film was completed by December 1995 and Graden initially distributed the video to eighty friends.

After The Spirit of Christmas became popular, Parker and Stone began to develop the characters and setting into an animated series titled South Park, and Fox was the first network they pitched the project to. After negotiations with Stone and Parker, Fox declined the series due to one of its characters being a sentient piece of feces, which later became Mr. Hankey. After bootleg distribution of the short made it a viral phenomenon, it caught the attention of Comedy Central, which hired the pair to develop the series. South Park eventually premiered on Comedy Central in August 1997 to immediate success.

This version of The Spirit of Christmas features a more established setting which is explicitly named "South Park", and Stan, Kyle, Cartman and Kenny are referred to by name for the first time and now have new designs that are similar to and would evolve into their current designs for the South Park series. There is also a character similar in appearance to Wendy Testaburger sitting on Santa's lap. The film also establishes recurring elements that later appear in the series, such as Cartman's antisemitism and rats consuming Kenny's corpse. The film reportedly had a budget of $750, with Parker and Stone keeping the remainder of their $1,000 commission.

The film's development is reflected in the fourth season episode "A Very Crappy Christmas". The episode revolves around the boys creating a Christmas card to raise the townspeoples' spirits during a bleak Christmas season, using a similar method of animation to the short films. Some lines of dialogue from Jesus vs. Santa are reused verbatim, and clips from the film are used later in the episode.

=== Release and reception ===
Jesus vs. Santa received a Los Angeles Film Critics Association Award for best animation in 1996.

The film can be found on the South Park The Hits: Volume 1 DVD. Short clips of both films are used in the original version of the series' theme song.

It was also included as a VHS recording in AVI format on the first 100,000 pressings of Tiger Woods '99 for PlayStation. It is accessible from the game disc by PC in a file named "ZZDUMMY.DAT." This unauthorized use caused the game to be recalled in January 1999 by Electronic Arts.

== Avenging Conscience ==
Avenging Conscience was formed by Parker, Stone, and two other students at the University of Colorado. They named the company after the D.W. Griffith film of the same title, which both had seen and actively disliked. It was formed to produce The Spirit of Christmas (1992) and Cannibal! The Musical (1993). Since then, three more projects were produced by Avenging Conscience: The Spirit of Christmas (1995), Orgazmo, and The Book of Orgazmo. Later on for the second film, it was renamed to Krankin/Blass Productions (a parody of Rankin/Bass Productions), and finally, Braniff Airlines (a name taken from the defunct Braniff airlines).

== See also ==
- List of Christmas films
- Santa Claus in film
