= Tegridy Farms Halloween Special =

- South Park episode
- Episode no.: Season 23; Episode 5
- Directed by: Trey Parker
- Written by: Trey Parker
- Production code: 2305
- Original air date: October 30, 2019

Guest appearance
- Brock Baker as Winnie the Pooh

Episode chronology
← Previous "Let Them Eat Goo"	Next → "Season Finale"
- South Park season 23

"Tegridy Farms Halloween Special" is the fifth episode of the twenty-third season of the American animated television series South Park. The 302nd episode overall of the series, it premiered on Comedy Central in the United States on October 30, 2019. The episode is a partial parody of the movie Creepshow. It centers upon marijuana farmer Randy Marsh's attempts to address his daughter Shelly's "marijuana problem", which is tied into the issue of Randy's relationship with the Chinese government, a recurring storyline during the season. A subplot concerns a surprise that awaits Butters Stotch after his visit to an exhibit of Egyptian artifacts at a Denver Museum.

== Plot ==
Marijuana farmer Randy Marsh, owner of Tegridy Farms, announces a Halloween special promotion to his family. However, his daughter, Shelly, has a "marijuana problem". She believes it smells bad and makes people "dumber than they already are." Randy tries to convince her of the positive benefits of marijuana, but the obstinate Shelly wishes it were illegal again. Randy takes Shelly to an exhibit of ancient Egyptian artifacts at the Denver Museum of Nature and Science, having promised her a father-daughter outing during which they could bond, but when he attempts to draw attention to the fact that the ancient Egyptians used hemp rope, she is angered to realize that the trip was another attempt to bring her to his way of thinking about marijuana.

Meanwhile, fourth grader Butters Stotch tours the same exhibit as part of his efforts to complete the exhibit's accompanying sticker stamp book. When he comes to the mummy of Egyptian royal Took-Tan-ra, an elderly museum employee warns him that this mummy harbors an "ancient love curse", and urges him not to put Took-Tan-ra's stamp in his book. Butters ignores the warning, after which the undead mummy of Took-Tan-ra visits Butters in his bedroom one night. Initially horrified at the rampaging monster, Butters then sees that he merely wants to hug Butters and give him a Fitbit device as a gift. The grateful Butters informs Took-Tan-ra that he already has one, and will give this new one to a friend, but Took-Tan-ra is enraged and storms out. After the mummy's rampage results in five deaths and property damage, the police visit Butters and relate that the mummy told them about the "argument" he had with Butters. Butters is astounded that the mummy spoke to the police, who admonish Butters for his "hurtful" conduct toward Took-Tan-ra. When Butters tells them that he may have been cursed by the mummy, but the police say that Took-Tan-ra told them the reverse. They also inform Butters that he must share in the damages caused by the mummy's rampage, and issue him a summons, advising him and the mummy to stay away from each other.

Following more attacks by the mummy, Butters meets with the school counselor, Mr. Mackey, but is incredulous to learn that undead being has also spoken to Mackey, who expresses a sympathetic view of the creature. Butters later meets with his classmates at a fast food restaurant, and tells them that he needs to end the curse, pointing to the endless texts and selfies that Took-Tan-ra sends him, but his classmates, like everyone else, speak as if the fault lies with Butters, and advise him to break things off with him, even as the mummy shows up there to continue his campaign of harassment.

Shelly cooks a witch's brew, and recites an accompanying incantation that will grant her revenge on her father. She dumps the brew onto the Halloween Special marijuana, horrifying Randy and his business partner, Towelie. This turns out to be an enhanced growth formula that increases Randy's yield. However, when he refuses to drive Shelly to a book fair on Halloween night, she destroys the packaged Halloween special, prompting Randy to ask the police to put her in jail for the night. She is placed in a cell with Butters, who has been imprisoned because he, not the mummy, "manipulates the mummy with his passive-aggressive selfishness".

At Randy's party, the revelers who smoke the Halloween Special mutate into monsters. Randy is then confronted by an undead Winnie the Pooh, whom Randy murdered in the episode "Band in China". Other monsters follow, including an unseen Harvey Weinstein, who rapes Randy during his emergency phone call to the police. The police race to Tegridy Farms with Butters, in the hopes that he can use his powers of manipulation to stop the mummy, who they believe is causing the attacks there. However, the horrors Randy experiences are revealed to be a hallucination caused by the mutated marijuana. Shelly ends these hallucinations by brewing an antidote that she throws at Randy. The ranking policeman there, Sergeant Harrison Yates, informs Butters that the mummy was not to blame for the emergency, prompting Butters to apologize to the mummy. The mummy resolves to leave for good, but before doing so, gives Butters a note written in hieroglyphics that translates as "I hope you can get the help you need. I can't fix you." Randy awakens three days later, and when his wife, Sharon says he was the only one who enjoyed the Halloween special, he says that he was pretty much the target audience anyway. He is also relieved that he did not really have anal sex with Harvey Weinstein, though he and the family are shocked to find a used condom that gives cause for them to question this.

== Reception ==
John Hugar with The A.V. Club gave the episode a rating of C+, calling it "uneven." He stated that the episode had strong potential but ultimately felt rushed.

Joe Matar, writing in Den of Geek, gave the episode a rating of 2 out of 5 stars. He criticized the Tegridy Farms story, which he felt had already been explored in the episode, "Shots!!!," and thought that the overall plot was "boring."
