= Informative Murder Porn =

- South Park episode
- Episode no.: Season 17; Episode 2
- Directed by: Trey Parker
- Written by: Trey Parker
- Production code: 1702
- Original air date: October 2, 2013

Episode chronology
← Previous "Let Go, Let Gov"	Next → "World War Zimmerman"
- South Park season 17

"Informative Murder Porn" is the second episode in the seventeenth season of the American animated television series South Park. The 239th episode of the series overall, it premiered on Comedy Central in the United States on October 2, 2013. The episode revolves around the children of South Park trying to stop their parents from watching "murder porn", television programs containing softcore pornography that reenact true crime stories.

== Plot ==
At South Park Elementary, student Peter Mullen gives a report on "murder porn", television shows that employ reenactments of murders provoked by spousal abuse and adultery, which the students' parents enjoy watching; Peter states exposure to such content leads for parents to kill each other. At the Marsh residence, Stan Marsh discovers his parents, Randy and Sharon, are watching "murder porn". That evening, Eric Cartman calls Stan, telling him that first grade student, Aaron Hagen's father has murdered his mother. The boys arrive at the scene while Aaron's mother's corpse is removed from the house (upsetting Aaron) and his father is arrested, while protesting his innocence.

The next day, at the Community Center, Kyle Broflovski holds a town meeting with the rest of the children of South Park, discussing the murder and its connection to "murder porn". Kyle informs the group that there is a phone application that imposes a parental lock on certain programs and employs a password that only children would know. When Stan's parents are locked out, unable to answer the security question, "How do you tame a horse in Minecraft?" (Note: In Minecraft, a horse is tamed by repeatedly mounting it until it doesn't buck the player; feeding the horse increases the chance of success.) (referring to the video game), Randy calls the cable company and learns that Stan locked them out.

Randy and the other parents go to the cable company to ask that the lock be removed, but the sadistic representatives they speak to rebuff them, while mockingly fondling their nipples. The parents subsequently learn that a child named Corey Lanskin can be hired to teach anyone how to play Minecraft.

The next day, Jimmy Valmer tells Stan and Kyle that some parents have broken their parental locks, and Butters has become grief-stricken because his father killed his mother in Minecraft, leading Kyle to realize that someone is teaching the game to their parents. At the community center, the children discuss how their parents are now not only continuing to watch murder porn, but are ruining their online experiences in Minecraft as well, blaming Kyle and his app.

The next day, the boys go to Corey's house, where they discover Corey teaching parents in the basement. They convince him about the negative effects Minecraft has had upon their parents and their use of it to keep their parents away from murder porn. Corey informs the boys that in order to protect their families, they will have to fight their cable company. The boys confront the cable company's representatives, who are unsympathetic until they learn about the prospective displeasure the parents would have at being unable to access murder porn. The representatives subsequently drop the murder porn channels from their standard network lineup, but still allow customers to opt-in to receive them - provided that they're willing to pay for the privilege, have a technician service their cable box in the dead of night every night, and also pay for 300 Portuguese language channels.

Angered that they have again lost their murder porn, Randy and Sharon resolve to play Minecraft, in which their avatars kill each other with great pleasure.

== Production ==
The idea of "murder porn" came from series co-creator Trey Parker and writer Bill Hader. Parker says that he and Hader knew the most about "murder porn" because they and their respective wives regularly watch it like the parents of South Park do in the episode. Parker felt that the programs comprising "murder porn" provide a lot of easy-to-spoof material, specifically citing the inaccurate depictions of the individuals involved in the crimes that "murder porn" reenacts. The channels in the episode that air the programs spoof Investigation Discovery, the Oprah Winfrey Network, and Cinemax.

Parker and fellow series co-creator Matt Stone chose Minecraft to be the secondary focus of the episode because they wanted something family friendly to contrast with the adult oriented programming that comprises "murder porn". They settled on Minecraft because the game was the first video game that Parker and Stone did not understand so they felt that the parents could have a similar experience. Parker and Stone said they contacted Mojang, developer of Minecraft, before making the episode to ask permission to use the game in the episode. They happily agreed and also sent merchandise to the South Park production crew.

== Reception ==
Andrew Wallenstein, writing for Variety, suggested that Discovery ID, the host of the "murder porn" programs in the episode, bears a striking resemblance to Investigation Discovery, which airs similar programming. Wallenstein also suggested that the logo of the Get Cable Company resembles the logo of Time Warner Cable.

IGN's Max Nicholson gave the episode a score of 7.8 out of 10, saying: "After last week's season premiere, South Park's 'Informative Murder Porn' was noticeably better, and depicted a simple but effective premise. The laughs weren't particularly gut-busting, but the jokes were nevertheless humorous and intelligent." Ryan McGee of The A.V. Club gave the episode a B+, saying: "Coming off a hit-and-miss season premiere, [...] 'Informative Murder Porn' keeps the satire local, social, and more consistently amusing in its second week."

Markus Persson, creator of Minecraft, tweeted approvingly about the episode. He followed up that he was asked for permission to include Minecraft in the episode and was sent out a rough outline. Persson told them "they could do whatever they want".
