= Christmas Snow (South Park) =

- South Park episode
- Episode no.: Season 23; Episode 10
- Directed by: Trey Parker
- Written by: Trey Parker
- Production code: 2310
- Original air date: December 11, 2019

Episode chronology
| ← Previous "Basic Cable" | Next → "The Pandemic Special" |
- South Park season 23

"Christmas Snow" is the tenth and final episode of the twenty-third season of the American animated television series South Park. The 307th episode overall of the series, it premiered on Comedy Central in the United States on December 11, 2019. It was the final regular episode for over two years until "Pajama Day" on February 2, 2022.

== Plot ==
Santa Claus warns people about driving drunk during Christmas, and encourages everyone to enjoy the holiday responsibly. His advice is promptly ignored as the residents of South Park dangerously drive around the city while impaired. The next day, they discover alcohol sales are banned until January 2, upsetting the townspeople since they must endure their families while sober. Without alcohol to drink, the streets are empty as the townsfolk intentinally only drive while intoxicated and Mayor McDaniels feels South Park has lost its Christmas spirit. She asks Randy Marsh (who has now grown a white beard) to resume selling marijuana to the citizens, despite the marijuana season being over. Randy and Towelie try to think of something new rather than repackaging old products. The falling snow inspires Randy to create "Christmas Snow": marijuana laced with a white substance. The people love it and resume driving under the influence.

The Mayor is shocked to find that Christmas Snow contains cocaine. Surprised, Randy quickly launches a protest and easily gets cocaine legalized in several states. Santa is upset that people continue to drive under the influence, now due to drugs, and marijuana sales are subsequently banned until after the holidays. Randy decides to sell pure "organic, local" cocaine, without the marijuana "impurities". It proves popular and people continue to drive impaired.

On Christmas Eve, Santa steals all the Christmas Snow from people's houses. People begin to panic as they wake up to discover their drugs are missing. Determined to save Christmas Snow, Randy chases Santa until he crashes his sleigh, and argues over the benefits of cocaine. Santa tries the drug and is impressed with the quality. Jesus arrives to settle the dispute, is convinced to try the cocaine, and is similarly won over. In order to return the Christmas Snow to South Park, Jesus levitates it into the air, causing it to snow cocaine over South Park. Everyone celebrates by consuming the drug and returning to driving under the influence.

== Reception ==
Jesse Schedeen from IGN gave the episode a 7.5 of out 10, writing, "'Christmas Snow' isn't quite fresh or memorable enough to rival South Park's best holiday episodes, but it does serve as a fitting cap to Season 23. It also proves the series hasn't quite used up Tegridy Farms as a valid plot device, though it would do well to give that plot point a rest for a while."

Chris Longo of Den of Geek gave the episode 4 stars out of 5, stating that the episode "lives up to the presents of Christmas' past."

Stephanie Williams of The A.V. Club gave the episode a grade of "B-", saying that the episode presents a "mixture of specials previously made this season but with a dash of cocaine."

Dani Di Placido of Forbes thought that the Tegridy Farms joke "has grown as stale as a wilted marijuana plant." He also criticized the legalization of cocaine in the episode, saying, "It's a bit of a strange joke; what's so funny about legalizing drugs? This concept simply isn't countercultural anymore, not in the slightest."
