= Let Them Eat Goo =

- South Park episode
- Episode no.: Season 23; Episode 4
- Directed by: Trey Parker
- Written by: Trey Parker
- Production code: 2304
- Original air date: October 16, 2019

Episode chronology
| ← Previous "Shots!!!" | Next → "Tegridy Farms Halloween Special" |
- South Park season 23

"Let Them Eat Goo" is the fourth episode of the twenty-third season of the American animated television series South Park. The 301st episode overall of the series, it premiered on Comedy Central in the United States on October 16, 2019.

In the episode, marijuana farmer Randy Marsh, needing to boost his profits, finds a new use for the discarded portions of his harvests that may raise his profits, campaigning for the town to move toward a plant-based diet; while Cartman sees this as a threat to the food he loves to eat. The episode references the 2007 film There Will Be Blood, and was also seen as a commentary on professional basketball player LeBron James's "wishy-washy statement on the consequences of free speech" in regards to the 2019–20 Hong Kong protests.

== Plot ==
Randy Marsh, owner of the marijuana business Tegridy Farms, tells his family that due to the end of his business deal with the Chinese government in the previous episode, profits are down. Randy's business partner, Towelie suggests taking the parts of the marijuana plants they usually discard after harvesting and sell it as mulch. Later at a Burger King, he samples one of that restaurant's plant-based Impossible Whoppers. Though he finds that it tastes awful, the realization that customers will pay for plant-based burgers, even ones that taste bad, inspires him to create Tegridy Burgers, which are made from his discarded marijuana plants.

At South Park Elementary school, fourth grader Eric Cartman is irritated that familiar lunch food like ground beef has been replaced with fish in response to complaints from students like Wendy Testaburger and Nichole, who tell Cartman that some students who do not eat red meat want healthier options. Enraged at the elimination of the food he likes, Cartman angrily rants before succumbing to a heart attack. The school counselor, Mr. Mackey, assures Cartman that the school menu will not change. Cartman subsequently delights in being able to eat barbecue ribs for lunch again, but Wendy and Nichole's continued protests prompt another heart attack for him.

Randy starts selling Tegridy Burgers, first at a stand outside the Burger King, and then at a restaurant across from it. This angers the Burger King's employee, Rick. Randy campaigns for the adoption of vegan diets at a town meeting, arguing that it is better for the environment and animals. As a result of his efforts, beef loses popularity, but this prompts an angry cattle rancher to appear at Randy's home with his cows, complaining that they are now useless. The rancher leaves the animals there, where they eat Randy's marijuana and pollute his farm with their waste. To remedy this, Randy and Towelie decide to shoot the cows all to death, an endeavor Randy says they can do if they get really high.

At a school assembly, PC Principal announces that as a compromise, Incredible Meat will be the supplier of the school's meals. That company's founder, who calls himself a Goo Man, says his green goo can be made to resemble any food requested, and that he wants to be the plant-based food supplier for the entire town. When Cartman returns to school from his hospital stay, he learns that on Taco Tuesday, the school cafeteria is serving Incredible Beef tacos. Not knowing it is plant-based, he eats the new tacos without incident. He learns the truth, however, from the Goo Man, who is now conspiring with Rick and the rancher. The Goo Man describes the complex industrial infrastructure responsible for the goo used to make Cartman's school lunches, but says that it does not work unless he owns all the eateries in town selling plant-based meat. When the Goo Man sees that Randy's new Tegridy Burgers restaurant is popular, it makes Randy a target for the Goo Man, who does not want competitors to his business.

During a news broadcast focusing on Randy's business, Rick poses as a student protester criticizing the unethical practices of Tegridy Farms. The newscast then shows footage of Randy and Towelie's cow-killing rampage, causing the townsfolk to turn against Tegridy Farms.

At school, Cartman reveals that he knows the truth about the plant-based meat in the school cafeteria, but that far from being angry, it is he who owes everyone else an apology. While he previously thought they were trying to force him to eat healthy, he has learned that the goo is made in a factory, with much added salt, just like all the other "processed crap that comes in a box" that he eats. Having only desired to "eat the same garbage" he always has, and since the goo is definitely garbage, he does not care that it is more sustainable or ethical.

== Reception ==
John Hugar with The A.V. Club gave the episode a B+ grade, praising the show for another strong episode. He especially liked the parody of There Will Be Blood's Daniel Plainview character, and commented in his review, "As we approach the mid-point of season 23, the show is in very good shape, and should have more than enough intriguing plotlines going on to keep viewers guessing the rest of the way."

Jesse Schedeen, reviewing the episode for IGN, gave it a "Good" score of 7.3, calling it a "solid but unspectacular episode". Comparing it to other episodes of the season, he thought it was "a less ambitious but solidly entertaining Cartman/Randy storyline". Schedeen lauded how the episode ties the two storylines together, and thought the use of the 2007 film There Will Be Blood to parody the plant-based meat storyline was an unexpected choice. Schedeen also enjoyed how Cartman's dialogue poked fun at professional basketball player LeBron James's "wishy-washy statement on the consequences of free speech" in regards to the 2019–20 Hong Kong protests.
