= A Song of Ass and Fire =

- South Park episode
- Episode no.: Season 17; Episode 8
- Directed by: Trey Parker
- Written by: Trey Parker
- Production code: 1708
- Original air date: November 20, 2013

Guest appearance
- Ami Kosaka as Princess Kenny

Episode chronology
| ← Previous "Black Friday" | Next → "Titties and Dragons" |
- South Park season 17

"A Song of Ass and Fire" is the eighth episode in the seventeenth season of the American animated television series South Park. The 245th episode of the series overall, it first aired on Comedy Central in the United States on November 20, 2013. The episode serves as a continuation of the previous episode, "Black Friday", in which the children of South Park, role-playing as characters from Game of Thrones, are split into two factions over whether to collectively purchase bargain-priced Xbox One or PlayStation 4 video game consoles at an upcoming Black Friday sale at the local mall, where Randy Marsh has been made the Captain of mall security. The story arc concludes with the following episode, "Titties and Dragons".

The episode was rated TV-MA-LSV in the United States.

== Plot ==
In continuation from the previous episode, the children of South Park are split into two factions over whether to purchase bargain-priced Xbox Ones or PlayStation 4s at an upcoming Black Friday sale at the South Park Mall. Kenny, role-playing as Lady McCormick, is revealed to have joined Stan's pro-PlayStation 4 faction because Cartman, who leads the pro-Xbox One faction, would not make him a princess. Meanwhile, as pre-Black Friday violence increases, the South Park Mall, where Randy Marsh has been made the Captain of security, announces that the early-shopper discount has been increased from 80% to 90%, leading to more shoppers gathering in front of the mall ahead of the sale.

Cartman becomes increasingly agitated with the Xbox people's training following Kenny's betrayal, and informs a worried Kyle that he has a plan. Seeking an advantage to counter the PS4 faction's increasing ranks, Cartman contacts Microsoft, but CEO Steve Ballmer dismisses the importance of the children's conflict and the commercialization of the console wars. When Microsoft Chairman Bill Gates learns of this, he has Ballmer murdered in order to personally see to it that Xbox wins the console wars. Gates allies himself with Channel 9's Morning News correspondent Niles Lawson, promising that the Black Friday violence will ensure high ratings. Lawson, playing both sides of the conflict, then informs Sony's CEO of this during a post-coital discussion, and in response, the CEO gives Kenny a brooch that turns him into a Japanese princess.

Cartman also sends Butters and Scott Malkinson to the New Mexico home of A Game of Thrones author George R. R. Martin for information on upcoming storylines, but Martin does nothing but regale the two children with plot points that emphasize male characters' penises. As Butters and Malkinson are about to leave, Martin tells them that he has connections with which he may be able to help their cause.

Lawson then reports that the mall, on Martin's suggestion, has moved the Black Friday sale one week from November 29 to December 6, and is now offering 96% off purchases to the first 100 people inside the mall, an announcement that leads to a brawl outside the mall.

== Production ==
Series co-creators Trey Parker and Matt Stone stated that they struggled when deciding where to take the plot next after establishing that this would be the second episode in a three-part story arc. Originally, the episode consisted almost entirely of each console side's leader recruiting recurring characters from all throughout the series' history to join their side; crab people and underpants gnomes among others made appearances before being cut. This premise was scrapped because Parker and Stone felt it wasn't enough like the content in Game of Thrones.

The Japanese Princess Kenny sequence was taken directly from the video game South Park: The Stick of Truth, which Parker and Stone worked on.

== Reception ==
Max Nicholson of IGN gave the episode a score of 8.4 out of 10, slightly lower than "Black Friday", saying: "Though not quite as strong as last week's Console War episode, 'A Song of Ass and Fire' was nevertheless entertaining and featured a number of great laugh-out-loud moments."

Marcus Gilmer from The A.V. Club gave the episode an A−, writing that the last two episodes "prove there's still plenty of life left in the show". He wrote: "Among all of these bigger thematic elements are, of course, great jokes and gags: Cartman's 'wizard and a king' exchange with the Microsoft operator; the boys having to tilt Cartman to get him through the McCormick's [sic] doorway; George R. R. Martin torturing poor Butters by not letting the wiener thing go and promising the pizzas (or dragons) are on their way and will be amazing. And, of course, the great anime-aping segment."

George R. R. Martin denied the insinuation made by his portrayal in the episode that he is obsessed with penises, saying, "I have to deny this as a scurrilous rumor. I have nothing against weenies, weenies are fine, but I am not obsessed with weenies. I am definitely on the boobies side of the equation. They picked the wrong equation for me. Boobies, not weenies."
