= Mexican Joker =

- South Park episode
- Episode no.: Season 23; Episode 1
- Directed by: Trey Parker
- Written by: Trey Parker
- Production code: 2301
- Original air date: September 25, 2019

Guest appearance
- Ryan Anderson Lopez as Martinez

Episode chronology
← Previous "Bike Parade"	Next → "Band in China"
- South Park season 23

"Mexican Joker" is the first episode of the twenty-third season of the American animated television series South Park. The 298th episode overall of the series, it premiered on Comedy Central in the United States on September 25, 2019. The episode parodies ICE detention centers and the moral panic surrounding the 2019 film Joker.

== Plot ==
Randy Marsh leads a tourist group around his Tegridy Farms marijuana farm, showing how it has grown and expanded. As Eric Cartman complains to Stan Marsh about the changes in the farm, Randy notes that his orders have decreased. When he visits Stephen Stotch to personally deliver some marijuana, he discovers that Stephen and others in South Park have started to grow their own marijuana, and Randy promises to take action. Randy forces Stan to plead to the South Park city council to ban private marijuana farms, but the council rejects the suggestion, and Randy is angered to the point where he completely denounces all of South Park. Later, Randy is visited by representatives from MedMen and they agree to work together. Randy's partner Towelie is upset that Randy has decided to sell out to corporations and leaves in disgust.

Cartman makes a threatening call to Kyle Broflovski just as ICE agents raid the Broflovski home and arrest the family while he happily watches; and is intrigued by the idea that ICE has the ability to separate families seemingly at will via an anonymous tip. The problem for the Broflovskis is advanced further by them being unable to find their passports and thus increasing the suspicion that they are illegal immigrants. When Kyle arrives at an ICE detention center and the staff discover that he is Jewish, they realize that they must get Kyle out as soon as possible or risk being viewed as anti-Semitic. As the ICE agents apologize to Kyle, he asks about the status of the other children in the camp and warns them that the stress and anxiety on the children could lead to the possibility of one of them becoming a Mexican Joker. The agents begin to overreact to this and wonder which child in their camp is the Mexican Joker. Later, a new bus of children arrives at the camp, with Cartman among them; he explains that Stan got him sent to a detention center after overhearing him threatening to do so to Jimmy (bragging that he already did so to Kyle in the process). Cartman realizes that the detention center may remind Kyle of Nazi concentration camps and claims to feel sorry for his actions, as Kyle devises a plan to have everyone escape.

A series of explosions throughout South Park destroys all of the private marijuana fields, an act for which the police immediately suspect Mexican Joker. Kyle has all of the detention center children fashion their aluminum foil blankets into yarmulkes to make them appear Jewish, in an attempt to get the agents to release them all, but the lead ICE agent, thinking he is experiencing a flashback to the origin of Mexican Joker, shoots and kills the other ICE agents. He then releases all the children, believing this will stop Mexican Joker from ever existing. Randy celebrates the restored sales of Tegridy Farms products.

== Reception ==
Chris Longo with Den of Geek rated the episode 2 out of 5 stars, summarizing his review by saying, "I feel like the wholesomeness of Tegridy has been ripped away from me. With all the bad in the world right now, why couldn't we just keep our Tegridy? Sigh. I don't have much hope for where this arc is going, but I'm a masochist and I'll be back next week."

John Hugar with The A.V. Club gave the episode a grade of "C+", and stated in his review, "the episode ultimately tries to do too much at once, and feels awkward and disjointed. In previous serialized seasons, the show eased its way into each thread, often introducing them one episode at a time before resolving them all during the final stretch."

Laura Bradley of Vanity Fair concluded on a more positive critique, stating, "There is a rare spark of life in this premiere—of quiet, at-times-snarky conviction. This is South Park, so don't expect a feel-good moment or an earnest lecture anytime soon—but it does seem that at last, South Park has found a way to do righteous anger its own way."

Alyse Wax of Collider gave both some positive and negative comments in her review, and stated, "Not a lot has changed with the show, other than it seems less outrageous nowadays. The social commentary has lost some of its bite as current events become closer to comedy. But this season, the social commentary is off to a better start than the last few seasons (such as the trolling or the election storylines)."
