= Black Friday (South Park) =

- South Park episode
- Episode no.: Season 17; Episode 7
- Directed by: Trey Parker
- Written by: Trey Parker
- Production code: 1707
- Original air date: November 13, 2013

Episode chronology
| ← Previous "Ginger Cow" | Next → "A Song of Ass and Fire" |
- South Park season 17

"Black Friday" is the seventh episode in the seventeenth season of the American animated television series South Park. The 244th episode of the series overall, it premiered on Comedy Central in the United States on November 13, 2013. The episode is the first of a three-episode story arc, which continues with "A Song of Ass and Fire", and concludes with "Titties and Dragons". The plot, which employs themes and motifs from the TV series Game of Thrones, concerns the characters' anticipation of a Black Friday sale, with Randy Marsh taking a temporary job as a mall security guard to gain an advantage over the holiday shopping crowds, and the children of South Park split into two factions over whether to collectively purchase bargain-priced Xbox One or PlayStation 4 video game consoles to facilitate their online group gaming.

This episode was submitted for, and received, a nomination for the Primetime Emmy Award for Outstanding Animated Program (for Programming Less Than One Hour) at the 66th Primetime Emmy Awards.

The episode was rated TV-MA-LSV in the United States.

== Plot ==
The security management at South Park Mall briefs its guards on the upcoming Black Friday shopping day. The security captain, a grizzled veteran with a large scar running down his face, tells the guards that this year, the mall is offering an 80% discount to the first 30 people in the mall, which is certain to again incite violence among shoppers. Among the guards is Randy Marsh, who has taken the temporary job not to earn extra holiday money as he says, but to acquire the discounts ahead of the crowds that will camp outside the mall.

Meanwhile, the boys of South Park are dressed in medieval garb while engaging in role playing inspired by Game of Thrones, and are themselves anticipating Black Friday. Cartman informs his classmates of the 80% discount, and says if they work together, they can all purchase one of the new gaming systems so that they can play online games together. The children, however, become split over whether to purchase Xbox Ones or PlayStation 4s. Kyle and Stan find themselves on opposite sides of the schism, with Kyle allied with Cartman's Xbox One faction, and Stan on the PS4 side. The two factions then begin recruiting other children to increase their ranks. Cartman, strolling through the "Garden of Andros" with Kenny, whose character is "Lady McCormick", tells him that they are only recruiting Xbox One loyalists to help them get inside the mall so they both can get cheap Xbox Ones. He wants Kenny to use his influence to "take care" of Kyle, should his loyalty to their faction falter. The garden is then revealed to be the elaborately landscaped back yard of an elderly South Park resident, who orders the children to stop trespassing on his property. This gag recurs throughout the three-part storyline, with Cartman playing different participants in the conflict against each other, only for the old man to inform them of this from his window, much to Cartman's irritation.

The mall's security is further daunted by the news that a new Tickle Me Elmo called "Stop Touching Me Elmo" is being released in time for Black Friday, which leads to shoppers camping outside even earlier than anticipated. The head of Sony has also announced a special bundle to help entice customers to side with PS4. To address increasing crowds, the mall's security tries to hand out wristbands so shoppers can hold places in line, but this leads to a brawl in which the captain is fatally stabbed. Cradling his dying superior, Randy reveals his true motives for having taken the job. The captain notes that Randy now knows how serious Black Friday is, and peels off the scar over his left eye, revealing it to be a prosthetic appliance. Before dying, he places it on Randy's face, telling Randy that regardless of his early motives, he is the captain now, and must now protect the town. Inspired by the new responsibility, Randy tells his fellow guards that they now have work to do. At the same time, Stan rallies his assembled army, telling them that Lady McCormick has joined them to make sure that the winner of the console war is the PS4.

== Production ==
From the beginning of season seventeen's production cycle, South Park co-creators Trey Parker and Matt Stone wanted to ensure that there was a two- or three-part storyline somewhere in this season because they have always enjoyed doing them as they allow for a different style of writing. They decided to actually start a multiple-episode storyline with this episode after coming off "Ginger Cow", which they felt could have easily been expanded into two or three episodes. The fact that "Ginger Cow" had to be compressed into the standard length of an episode left Parker and Stone wanting to doing something bigger even more. With four episodes left to be produced for this season, Parker and Stone contemplated making a four-part storyline but wrapped it up at three.

As for what the three-part storyline would be about, Parker and Stone said that they had been talking about doing a Game of Thrones-themed episode for a long time since they both watched the show and found many things to satirize. Butters' scenes in the three episodes which centered on his understanding of Game of Thrones were the first jokes that were visualized by Parker and Stone as being one of the running gags; they also helped solidify Game of Thrones' role in the plot. Once they decided to center the episodes around Black Friday, the Game of Thrones angle became a great way to tie both stories together as Parker and Stone felt Black Friday was something that would really fit well in Game of Thrones. They soon felt that they were onto a big idea that would be received well by audiences.

Before the Game of Thrones and Black Friday elements became part of the episode, the original premise of the storyline was focused on the large amount of cut content from South Park: The Stick of Truth, a video game which Parker and Stone were heavily involved in the development of. However, as the episode became more and more focused on Game of Thrones and Black Friday, the aspects which were lifted from the game were almost entirely scrapped.

== Reception ==
"Black Friday" received critical acclaim. Max Nicholson of IGN gave the episode a score of 8.7 out of 10, writing: "Cleverly fusing elements of the Next-Gen Console War with HBO's Game of Thrones, 'Black Friday' was easily one of the best South Park episodes we've seen in Season 17."

Ryan McGee of The A.V. Club gave the episode an A−, praising the Game of Thrones parody, saying, "Why wrap Game of Thrones in all this? There's no real reason to do so, except that it's really amusing and offers up a great way to frame the overall narrative. What makes the approach really work is that 'Black Friday' is not a one-for-one parody so much as a thematic one."
