= Turd Burglars =

- South Park episode
- Episode no.: Season 23; Episode 8
- Directed by: Trey Parker
- Written by: Trey Parker
- Production code: 2308
- Original air date: November 27, 2019

Episode chronology
| ← Previous "Board Girls" | Next → "Basic Cable" |
- South Park season 23

"Turd Burglars" is the eighth episode of the twenty-third season of the American animated television series South Park. The 305th episode overall of the series, it premiered on Comedy Central in the United States on November 27, 2019.

== Plot ==
At the South Park Community Center, Sheila Broflovski is giving a speech about women's rights in South Park but becomes violently ill, and begins vomiting and defecating uncontrollably. At Hell's Pass Hospital, her doctor tells her sons Kyle and Ike that Sheila has a bacterial infection called C. diff, causing the beneficial bacteria in her stomach to be overrun by malignant bacteria, and that she needs a fecal transplant to replace her microbiome. After the transplant, Sheila extols the beneficial health effects of the procedure to her friends Laura Tucker, Harriet Biggle, and Linda Stotch, much to the embarrassment of her sons. Consulting a video on how to prevent ridicule over such a thing, Kyle is horrified to learn that microorganisms comprise half of the cells in his body. At night he dreams of bacteria and the image of a bookcase that causes him to awaken with a gasp.

Sheila's friends tell her that they would like to undergo a fecal transplant, but that their doctors would only prescribe the procedure for medical reasons, and ask her to donate a stool sample so they can perform the procedure themselves at home. Sheila declines, as she finds this inadvisable. Harriet goes to Kyle and offers to give him a copy of Star Wars Jedi: Fallen Order if he procures a stool sample from Sheila. Kyle refuses, but his three friends, Stan Marsh, Eric Cartman, and Kenny McCormick, take her up on her offer. Stan, Cartman, and Kenny sneak into the Broflovskis' basement and access the soil pipe while Sheila uses the toilet, stealing her feces, much to the anger of Kyle, who catches them in the act.

Kyle consults his doctor to complain about microbiome swapping, and wonders if people with ideal health profiles like Tom Brady will become targets of those wanting such transplants. At the mention of Brady's name, however, the doctor becomes unsettled and begins a whispered inner monologue, a recurring gag in the episode. He notes that Kyle "knows" about Brady's microbiome, which he calls "The Spice Melange". Though Brady's microbiome (the "spice") is unobtainable, the doctor wonders if Kyle will be the one who will bring it to him.

Harriet praises the fecal transplant procedure's benefits to her friends, having performed an at-home transplant with a turkey baster, but refuses to tell Sheila where she got the stool sample from. The boys are confronted by school counselor Mr. Mackey, who offers to buy each of them their own separate copy of Fallen Order if they obtain for him someone else's stool sample, which he also calls "The Spice Mélange" in his inner dialogue. At a post-game press conference, the press repeatedly ask Brady for a stool sample, which he says he will not give or sell to anyone. As Kyle's dreams about the microbiome continue, he again is haunted by visions of the bookcase, and develops the ability to see the microorganisms covering his body when awake. At another shared meal, Harriet, ill and covered in vomit stains, confronts her friends and angrily accuses Sheila of tainting her feces in some way to sabotage her transplant. Linda and Laura then become ill themselves, having stolen the remainder of Harriet's stolen sample and performed their own transplants. As Hell's Pass Hospital fills with local citizens suffering from C-diff, a doctor tells police detective Harrison Yates that the outbreak began at the restaurant where patrons became infected by Sheila's friends. He explains that because the turkey basters they used for their transplants are only used once a year at Thanksgiving, they spend the rest of the year collecting pathogenic bacteria. He then says the hospital is out of healthy donor feces, and that because enough healthy feces could not be harvested in time to give all the patients transplants, half of South Park will die.

The boys go to Brady's house, where they wait with other people hoping to acquire his "Spice Melange". Brady demands everyone leave, but Kyle appears and leads everyone to Brady's living room bookcase, which he reveals to be a secret door to a hidden room where Brady keeps his jarred feces. Brady explains that he stopped flushing it because people kept breaking his pipes to acquire them. The boys bring the feces to the hospital, where it is used to treat all the infected patients. When Sheila asks Kyle how he knew how to resolve the outbreak, Kyle explains that his microbiome knew, saying he has learned that the creatures inside him are part of him, and that he will now "trust his gut" a bit more.

A running joke purports the episode to be "one for the ladies", with a unique intro and bumpers between commercial breaks repeatedly proclaiming this.

== Cultural references ==
References to the 'spice melange', Kyle's blue eyes, and the visualization of Tom Brady's defecation to look like a giant worm rising out of a desert landscape are references to the Frank Herbert novel Dune. In addition to using music from the soundtrack, the inner dialogue used by many of the characters is a reference to the 1984 film adaptation of the novel, where it was used for direct exposition to the audience to help drive the plot and thus shorten the running time.

== Reception ==
The episode garnered just 660,000 viewers on its first US airing, the lowest audience ever recorded for a South Park episode.

Jesse Schedeen from IGN gave the episode a 9.7 of out 10, stating in his review, "South Park may not be as consistent as it once was, but the series can still deliver episodes that rival the best of its golden years. By combining a classic format with hilarious poop jokes and the most bizarrely entrancing Dune parody imaginable, this episode hits all the right notes."

Joe Matar of Den of Geek gave the episode 3 stars out of 5, stating, "It's not a particularly bad episode. In fact, in what has been a largely boring, unfunny season, it's probably the best one so far. Still, in the end, like so many South Park episodes, how much you enjoy yourself will depend on how much you're into the running gags that get repeated again and again throughout. In this case, those gags are a Dune reference and women puking and shitting a lot. For me, this stuff had diminishing returns. I'd rate 'Turd Burglars' somewhere between 'meh' and 'fine.'"

Stephanie Williams of The A.V. Club gave the episode a grade of "B", saying in her review, "The ladies received the same power as the men of South Park, and that's shitty power, no pun intended."
