= Ginger Cow =

- South Park episode
- Episode no.: Season 17; Episode 6
- Directed by: Trey Parker
- Written by: Trey Parker
- Production code: 1706
- Original air date: November 6, 2013

Episode chronology
← Previous "Taming Strange"	Next → "Black Friday"
- South Park season 17

"Ginger Cow" is the sixth episode in the seventeenth season of the American animated television series South Park. The 243rd episode of the series overall, it first aired on Comedy Central in the United States on November 6, 2013. In the episode, Cartman modifies a cow to make it look like a ginger as a joke. However, various religious groups see this as a prophecy being fulfilled and peace is brought to the Middle East.

== Plot ==
At South Park Elementary, Eric Cartman announces that he wishes to apologize to Kyle Broflovski, saying that Kyle was correct the previous day when he told Cartman that humans are not the only animals that can have light skin and freckles. Telling them that he has discovered a ginger cow, Cartman takes his classmates to a nearby farm, where he shows them a cow that has been given a red wig and painted white with giant red "freckles". Though Kyle sees through this obvious prank, Cartman insists to his credulous classmates that it is real.

News of the cow spreads across the globe and is widely interpreted as the fulfillment of a Biblical prophecy regarding a red heifer that signals the end times, prompting mass suicides. Kyle is then called to Mr. Mackey's office, where he is introduced to three Israeli rabbis, who explain the prophecy to him. Kyle tries to convince them that the red heifer is a forgery on Cartman's part, but the farm where the cow is located becomes a pilgrimage site where large numbers of Jews, Muslims, and Christians congregate, each claiming the cow for their respective religions. However, when the three religious sects meet to plan Armageddon, they realize that they are negotiating in a civil manner and that the prophecy may have meant that the cow would signal the end of war, and not the end of the world. The congregants then agree to sacrifice the cow in order to fulfill the prophecy.

Peace is achieved in the Middle East among the three Abrahamic religions, who morph the Christian cross, Jewish Star of David, and Islamic crescent moon into a new unifying symbol—the logo of the band Van Halen, which appears on a stage to commence a 10-year concert in Israel. Cartman then appears at Kyle's house and admits that the cow was a forgery and states that he intends to admit this publicly. Realizing that this revelation may ruin the interfaith peace that the forgery achieved, Kyle asks him not to. Cartman agrees to withhold this information, on condition that Kyle do everything that Cartman says, which includes indignities such as insulting his own mother Sheila to her face, performing menial tasks and humiliating himself in public by allowing Cartman to fart in his face and claiming that he enjoys it.

Kyle, who is conflicted over the morality of the deception, experiences a vision of a spirit that praises his sacrifice and compels him to shave his head. However, Stan Marsh becomes a critical person to Kyle, telling him that while publicly claiming to like Cartman's farts is his prerogative, the self-righteous manner that he has adopted when doing so is not. Kyle is unmoved, and Stan, noting that Kyle's odd behavior began with the peace in the Middle East, seeks to investigate it with Kenny McCormick.

Kyle and Cartman travel to Israel, where Cartman intends to further humiliate Kyle by having him endure his farts and claim to enjoy it on a stage before thousands of people. Their demonstration is interrupted, however, by a broadcast hosted by Anderson Cooper, in which Stan intends to expose the truth about Cartman's red cow. Kyle, speaking to Stan privately by cell phone, explains why he has been enduring Cartman's abuse and convinces Stan not to expose the truth, in order to preserve the new peace. Acquiescing to this, Stan instead announces in the broadcast that he saw the cow descend miraculously from heaven. However, the prophecy stated that a fat child with a small penis would disguise a cow to look ginger, not that one would just miraculously fall from the sky. The short-lived peace among the three religions falls apart. Kyle, realizing that the prophecy really has occurred, tries to convince the rabbis that this is precisely what happened, but Cartman (insulted at his penis size in the prophecy) refuses to corroborate this, claiming, "I have a huge dick." The episode ends with Cartman farting one last time on a crestfallen Kyle.

== Production ==
On the DVD commentary for the episode, South Park co-creator Matt Stone revealed that the story was inspired by material he had read on the red heifer's prominence in the Abrahamic religions, which lent itself to the story on how peace is achieved in the Middle East.

Parker and Stone felt that, in hindsight, the episode should have been a two-part storyline, explaining that the premise could have been mined for further development, perhaps even for a feature film. They were forced to cut a lot of content to condense the episode to the standard runtime of around twenty-one minutes.

== Reception ==
Max Nicholson of IGN gave the episode a score of 7.5 out of 10, stating that it "touches on some great ideas that would have benefited from more time."

Ryan McGee of The A.V. Club gave the episode a B+ rating, stating, "'Ginger Cow' comes very close to utterly succeeding on several occasions, but ultimately settles for being fascinating. There are some great ideas here that no amount of screen time would ever sufficiently answer. But those ideas still needed more screen time to sufficiently debate. Still, in a season as subpar as this has been, it’s heartening to see the show can still recapture some of its past heights this late in the game."
