= Band in China =

- South Park episode
- Randy stares in horror as he watches a man be beaten by guards through the Chinese jail's window.
- Episode no.: Season 23; Episode 2
- Directed by: Trey Parker
- Written by: Trey Parker
- Production code: 2302
- Original air date: October 2, 2019

Guest appearance
- Brock Baker as Winnie the Pooh

Episode chronology
← Previous "Mexican Joker"	Next → "Shots!!!"
- South Park season 23

"Band in China" is the second episode of the twenty-third season of the American animated television series South Park. The 299th episode overall of the series, it premiered on Comedy Central in the United States on October 2, 2019. The episode parodies media censorship in China, and the manner in which the American entertainment industry purposefully compromises its productions in order to be acceptable to Chinese censors.

The episode generally positive reviews from American critics, while triggering a negative response from China. The Chinese government banned South Park entirely following this episode's release, a move which in turn drew criticism from the creators of the show.

== Plot ==
As fourth grader Stan Marsh composes a song for his new death metal band, Crimson Dawn, his father Randy announces to the family that he plans to travel to China to expand the family's Tegridy Farms marijuana business. Upon boarding a plane to China, Randy sees many other people, including NBA players and Disney characters, who are also going there to expand their businesses. He is arrested at a Chinese airport when marijuana is discovered in his luggage, and incarcerated. In prison, Randy witnesses the practice of summary execution, and is subjected to re-education through labor, torture, and Communist Party re-education.

During a Crimson Dawn rehearsal, the band is visited by a music producer who wants to make a biographical film of the band, as traditional music resources such as albums and tours are no longer profitable. Stan, who desperately wants to leave his farm home, is thrilled. When the film's structure is discussed, the bandmates learn that certain aspects of their lives will have to be edited out in order to make the film marketable in China due to that nation's censorship of the media.

In prison, Randy meets fellow prisoners Winnie the Pooh and Piglet, who are there because they were banned in China after Internet memes comparing Chinese Communist Party leader Xi Jinping to Disney's version of Pooh became popular. When Randy is brought before a court, he criticizes the Chinese government for the way it treats its prisoners, accusing them of lacking "tegridy" (his term for integrity). When Mickey Mouse learns of Randy's criticism, he angrily confronts Randy over the Chinese business he is losing because of it, but Randy holds firm in his belief that business should not be conducted on the basis of intimidation, and expresses his marijuana import idea to him. When Mickey and Randy make their case to the Chinese officials, their offer is rejected, which Mickey attributes to the Winnie the Pooh matter. Randy responds by using honey to lure Pooh to a secluded alley and strangling him to death as Piglet watches in horror.

During filming on the Crimson Dawn movie, the censorship continues to the point that Chinese officials are on set to approve its content. The producer asks Stan to rewrite the script "from his heart", but Stan is frustrated by a Chinese censor standing over his shoulder as he writes in his bedroom, erasing passages he disapproves of. Later with his bandmates, Stan realizes that the only film that will even be accepted in China is something "vanilla and cheesy". Stan's best friend, Kyle Broflovski, disembarks from a bus with Eric Cartman following their stay in an ICE detention center in the previous episode. The friends' reunion inspires Stan to re-form his previous band Fingerbang for a new biopic, but he changes his mind during filming, saying that no matter how badly he wishes to leave the farm, he cannot bring himself to compromise for China, and commenting that anyone who does is worthless. Meanwhile, Tegridy Weed has become legal in China. As a dump truck unloads a load of cash at the farm during a family meal, Stan asks Randy why he is covered in honey and blood. When Randy admits that he murdered Pooh, Stan calmly leaves the table to write another song about his father.

== Production ==
The day prior to the episode's release, the series' producers released a statement asking for both male and female voice actors to portray Winnie-the-Pooh and Piglet, respectively. The audition request did not specify what the episode would entail, simply asking for interested voice actors. During the scene of Stan's band performing at a festival, the song "Useless Sacrifice" by the French metal group Death Decline plays. Later, during the rehearsal scene, the song "Second Skin" by the American metal group Dying Fetus plays.

== Reception and controversy ==
=== Reception ===
John Hugar with The A.V. Club gave the episode a grade of "B", calling it "strong". He compared Parker and Stone's decision to critique the role that the Chinese government plays in the American entertainment industry to past instances in which they displayed similar boldness in their choice of target, as when they commented on media depictions of the Islamic prophet Muhammad in past episodes. Hugar thought the arrest Randy suffers as a result of his failure to research marijuana laws in China was among the series' funniest moments. He also lauded the reveal of Crimson Dawn's music and the use of Mickey Mouse, both to defuse tense scenes and as a key part of the story's resolution.

Forbes contributor Dani Di Placido said the episode was "hilarious, and depressingly insightful," and pointed to the contrast between Stan's decision and Randy's choice to put profit above principle as the best example of that.

Joe Matar, writing in Den of Geek, was less favorable, giving the episode a rating of 2 out of 5 stars; he thought that Trey Parker's tying Stan and Randy's relationship issues to the episode's greater ethical questions was intelligent writing, but thought the episode overall was marred by "lazy plotting and tired shock humor".

Matthew Rozsa of Salon felt the episode expressed valid criticism about the manner in which the American entertainment industry compromises itself to suit China's government, and enjoyed the way in which it illustrated this point.

Jahara Matisek, a professor at the US Air Force Academy, praised the episode in an article for the Modern War Institute, describing the importance of South Park demarcating an American shift in information and political warfare against China. Matisek contended that the now banned-in-China episode "not only lays bare the conflict of values, but also itself serves as a way of advancing American interests and soft power in an era of China increasingly trying to impose an authoritarian vision on its region and world."

=== Chinese ban ===
In response to the episode's criticism of the Chinese government, South Park was entirely banned in China, including on its streaming services and social media platforms.

In October 2019, insiders told Bloomberg News that Apple Inc., which has a significant portion of its users and manufacturers in China, was reportedly unlikely to bid for the streaming rights of the series due to the China ban.

In response to the criticisms and the subsequent ban of their show in China, South Park creators Matt Stone and Trey Parker issued a mock apology, stating, "Like the NBA, we welcome Chinese censors into our homes and into our hearts. We too love money more than freedom and democracy. Xi doesn't look just like Winnie the Pooh at all. Tune into our 300th episode this Wednesday at 10! Long live the Great Communist Party of China! May this autumn's sorghum harvest be bountiful! We good now China?" This was a reference to a then-ongoing controversy surrounding the National Basketball Association (NBA) and Daryl Morey's comments regarding the 2019–20 Hong Kong protests. On the night of October 8, 2019, the episode was screened on a busy street in Hong Kong's Sham Shui Po District as a form of protest.
