= Goth Kids 3: Dawn of the Posers =

- South Park episode
- Episode no.: Season 17; Episode 4
- Directed by: Trey Parker
- Written by: Trey Parker
- Production code: 1704
- Original air date: October 23, 2013

Episode chronology
← Previous "World War Zimmerman"	Next → "Taming Strange"
- South Park season 17

"Goth Kids 3: Dawn of the Posers" is the fourth episode in the seventeenth season of the American animated television series South Park. The 241st episode of the series overall, it premiered on Comedy Central in the United States on October 23, 2013. It was originally scheduled to air October 16, but a power outage that occurred at South Park Studios in Los Angeles prevented the episode from being finished in time, breaking a streak of 240 episodes aired consecutively without ever missing a single deadline. The new streak caused by the delay would not be broken until season twenty-seven in 2025, when the season's fifth episode was not completed by its scheduled air date and had to be delayed a week.

The episode was rated TV-MA-L in the United States.

The episode satirizes the goth, emo, and vampire teen subcultures, and uses plot elements from the film Invasion of the Body Snatchers. It also serves as a sequel to both "Raisins" and "The Ungroundable".

== Plot ==
Henrietta, a member of a clique of Goth kids at South Park Elementary School, is informed by her parents that she is being sent to Troubled Acres, a two-week camp for teenagers with emotional problems. At Troubled Acres, Henrietta is locked in a cell that is monitored by a security camera. Her only contact with anyone comes when a trapdoor opens on the floor of her cell, and a potted plant is deposited before her, vibrating as if it was sentient.

Two weeks later, much to the horror of her friends, Michael, Pete, and Firkle, Henrietta returns to South Park as an emo, sporting some minor cosmetic changes to her appearance, and begins associating with the emo kids. When Michael confronts Henrietta over what the camp has done to her, he realizes that Troubled Acres is part of a plot to turn the entire world emo, and ends up being transported by his father to Troubled Acres. Realizing that goths are being "body-snatched" by emos, Pete and Firkle attend a meeting of their sworn enemies, the Vampire kids, and explain the problem to them. Mike, the lead Vamp Kid, and a black male adult member of the Vamp Kids agree to help, and during a séance, summon the spirit of Edgar Allan Poe, to whom both the Vamp Kids and the Goth Kids regard as their spiritual progenitor. Poe thinks little of emos, vampires, or goths, but agrees to help anyway.

At Troubled Acres, Michael finds himself tied to a chair in a greenhouse filled with potted plants. He is told by Harold Flanagan, the plants' elderly caretaker, that the plants are the actual emos, sentient beings who invade the bodies of humans via spores. Pete, Mike, the black man, and Firkle arrive, but Firkle reveals himself to be emo, and captures the other three at gunpoint, tying them up alongside Michael. The ghost of Poe then intervenes, and points out that the plants are just ordinary ficus plants in vibrating pots. A television production crew then appears, and reveals that Flanagan has been the target of a hidden camera prank television show called Yes, I Was Scared! The host further explains that Troubled Acres and the idea of the plants turning goths and vamp kids into emos were part of the prank, as all those cliques, he says, are "exactly the same thing."

Firkle realizes that the change in clique allegiance he underwent was entirely of his own accord, and when Michael and Pete subsequently tell this to Henrietta, she is overcome with embarrassment. Wishing to spare her feelings, Pete then retracts what he and Michael have just said, and instead tells Henrietta that they have infiltrated the emo lair and destroyed the King Emo plant. Hearing this, Henrietta feigns a reverse transformation, and says that she is her true Goth self once again.

== Production ==
"Goth Kids 3: Dawn of the Posers" was written and directed by series co-creator Trey Parker, and was originally scheduled to air on October 16, 2013. South Park episodes are usually produced in only six days and delivered to Comedy Central around 12 hours before airing. However, on October 15, South Park Studios suffered a power outage, causing the staff's computers to go down during post-production and leaving the episode incomplete, missing its deadline for the first time in the show's 17-season run. Series co-creator Trey Parker wrote that "it sucks to miss an air date but after all these years of tempting fate by delivering the show last minute, I guess it was bound to happen." A rerun of the fifth season episode "Scott Tenorman Must Die" was shown in its place, with live tweets accompanying the broadcast. "Goth Kids 3: Dawn of the Posers" eventually aired one week later on October 23, 2013.

The episode's opening title sequence departs from the one used since the beginning of the seventeenth season, as it features the Goth kids as the central characters instead of the series' four main characters, and uses elements from the discontinued title sequence that had previously been used for the series' first three seasons, and a version of the show's theme song with altered lyrics that reflect the Goth kids' bleak outlook.

== Reception ==
Ryan McGee of The A.V. Club gave the episode a C−, saying: "Unfortunately, 'Goth Kids 3: Dawn of the Posers' was a fairly limp episode, one that an extra unexpected week of time apparently could not fix".

Chris Longo of Den of Geek gave the episode 1 out of 5 stars, opining: "Instead of realizing the tired Emo/Goth storyline is about six years past its expiration date, South Park drudged on to complete its most uninspired episode of the young season."

Max Nicholson of IGN gave the episode a score of 7.7 out of 10, declaring that "this week's South Park proved that the goth kids still had enough material for (most of) one more episode."
