= Titties and Dragons =

- South Park episode
- Episode no.: Season 17; Episode 9
- Directed by: Trey Parker
- Written by: Trey Parker
- Production code: 1709
- Original air date: December 4, 2013

Episode chronology
| ← Previous "A Song of Ass and Fire" | Next → "The Hobbit" |
- South Park season 17

"Titties and Dragons" is the ninth episode in the seventeenth season of the American animated television series South Park. The 246th episode of the series overall, it premiered on Comedy Central in the United States on December 4, 2013. It is the conclusion of a three-episode story arc that began with "Black Friday", and continued with "A Song of Ass and Fire". The story centers upon the children of South Park, role-playing as characters from Game of Thrones, split into two factions over whether to collectively purchase bargain-priced Xbox One or PlayStation 4 video game consoles at an upcoming Black Friday sale at the local mall, where Randy Marsh has been made the Captain of mall security. The episode received critical acclaim.

== Plot ==
In the conclusion of a three-part storyline, the children of South Park are split into two factions over whether to purchase bargain-priced Microsoft Xbox Ones or Sony PlayStation 4s at an upcoming Black Friday sale at the South Park Mall, a schism that sees best friends Stan Marsh (PS4) and Kyle Broflovski (Xbox) on opposite sides.

As the PS4 faction turn their attention to the Red Robin restaurant, which serves as a side entrance into the mall, the Xbox One faction arrives to announce they wish to join the PS4 ranks. Though Stan does not trust them, Cartman and Kyle say they have a way to monopolize the Red Robin: by renting it out for a wedding party.

Cartman and Stan, who are having a private talk in the "Garden of Andros", are interrupted by the elderly owner, who informs Stan of the true intentions of the Xbox faction: they have merely feigned surrender in order to lock the PS4 faction in the Red Robin while they retrieve their consoles. Stan is further angered to be told that this was Kyle's idea. To prevent Stan from informing his allies of this, Cartman defecates in the old man's yard and frames Stan for it, resulting in Stan being grounded. When Kyle learns of this, he tries to explain his actions to Stan but he is promptly sent away.

As Randy Marsh's mall security guards deal with the increasing shopper violence, George R. R. Martin arrives at the mall to cut the ribbon that will open the mall for the Black Friday sale. However, he stalls by regaling the agitated crowd with musings on his penis. The same impatient shopper that killed the captain charges forward, slices off Martin's penis, and cuts the ribbon, allowing the crowd into the mall, leading to mass deaths.

In the Red Robin, Kyle, Kenny and their allies turn on Cartman and his faction, revealing that they are no longer Xbox supporters. The standoff is then interrupted by Bill Gates and the head of Sony. The Sony executive is brutally killed by Gates, who announces that Xbox is victorious. The children journey through the blood-and-corpse-covered mall to purchase their Xbox Ones. While playing with his new console, Cartman realizes that he wishes to play outside, saying that their improvised Game of Thrones role-playing over the past few weeks has been filled with so much drama, action and romance that they do not need Microsoft or Sony to have fun.

== Production ==
As with the previous episode, the show's opening title sequence is modified to depict the characters in their role-playing garb, while the soundtrack has been altered to include the penis-themed chorus singing to the Game of Thrones opening theme introduced in the previous episode. Series co-creators Trey Parker and Matt Stone said that they experimented with different styles of opening sequences before settling on the penis-themed chorus version; a Japanese Princess Kenny opening sequence was one of the original ideas.

== Reception ==
"Titties and Dragons" received widespread critical acclaim. Max Nicholson of IGN gave the episode a score of 9.0 out of 10, writing, "The final chapter of South Park's Black Friday trilogy finished strong, with plenty of laugh-out-loud moments, subtle commentary and genius satire. There were a few nitpicks—most of which were negligible—but overall, this week's episode proved that Matt and Trey can still dish out a satisfying multipart [sic] arc, with style."

Marcus Gilmer of The A.V. Club gave the episode an "A−" rating, praising the "Red Robin Wedding", and said, "The show’s ability to inject a bit of soul is one of the best tricks the writers have pulled off regularly throughout the show's run. Beneath all the crude jokes and the potty humor, there's legitimate heart that manages to be genuine and self-aware without ever straying into the maudlin."
