= Basic Cable (South Park) =

- South Park episode
- Episode no.: Season 23; Episode 9
- Directed by: Trey Parker
- Written by: Trey Parker
- Production code: 2309
- Original air date: December 4, 2019

Guest appearance
- Becca Scott as Sophie Gray

Episode chronology
← Previous "Turd Burglars"	Next → "Christmas Snow"
- South Park season 23

"Basic Cable" is the ninth episode of the twenty-third season of the American animated television series South Park. The 306th episode overall of the series, it premiered on Comedy Central in the United States on December 4, 2019.

The episode centers upon the character Scott Malkinson, and features an opening title sequence for that purpose. In the story, Scott's efforts to court a new female classmate hinge on his ability to acquire access to streaming media, which his father, a lazy cable company technician, detests. The plot parodies the competition between traditional cable television and streaming media, and references the Disney+ series The Mandalorian, as well as the October 2019 acquisition by HBO Max of the streaming rights to South Park previously held by Hulu.

== Plot ==
Fourth grader Scott Malkinson asks his father Clark, a technician for Park County Cable, if they can subscribe to the streaming service Disney+. Clark rebukes him for having repeatedly made this request, telling him that the cable television they have is sufficient, and that he is tired of the growing popularity of streaming media. As Clark storms off to work, Scott, who has type 1 diabetes, realizes that the stress of his father's rant has caused his blood sugar to rise, and self-administers a shot of insulin.

At South Park Elementary, the fourth grade class learns that the newest student, a girl named Sophie Gray, also has diabetes. As Scott's friends are always ridiculing him for having diabetes, Scott believes she is perfect for him, and declares that he is in love with her. When the other boys also express an interest in her, Scott angrily resolves that he will not allow them to ruin this opportunity for him. He begins sabotaging the efforts of other boys to court her in order to woo her himself. When he learns that she is an avid fan of the Disney+ series The Mandalorian, he feigns interest in it. When she suggests watching the next episode at Scott's house, Scott agrees, despite not having Disney+.

Clark receives word of a job. Despite the fact that his business has been suffering in part because of customer complaints of slow service, Clark procrastinates by going shopping and bowling. This laxness and procrastination in the face of important obligations serves as a recurring gag in the episode. When he arrives at the residence of Stephen and Linda Stotch 15 minutes after the end of a five-hour estimated service window, an irritated Stephen Stotch complains and threatens to quit cable in favor of streaming. When Scott again asks his father for a Disney+ subscription for his date with Sophie, Clark again refuses, and contacts his coworkers to conspire to sabotage the streaming services in South Park, though he arranges to meet with them at some point during a four-hour window.

Clark rallies his co-workers about the damage that streaming has done to their business. He also points out that the streaming services use the cable that they laid throughout the town, and says they should disrupt that infrastructure in order to show the townsfolk how much they still need them. When Clark's coworkers agree, he delegates assignments to each of them, but says they should meet at a designated point sometime during a three-hour window. The cable repairmen take advantage of this window by engaging in a number of personal activities. This angers Clark, who repeatedly tells them that they should not make a practice of keeping appointments at the very end of windows several hours long, but Clark nonetheless continues this habit himself.

Scott buys a black market Disney+ login for his date with Sophie, but as Clark and his colleagues vandalize the cable lines running throughout town, Scott's account stops working. Sophie suggests going to Jimmy Valmer's house, where their other classmates are gathered to watch the show, though Scott fears this may threaten his attempts to court Sophie. However, Jimmy's streaming service also malfunctions, as do those of everyone else in town. When the boys attempt to ingratiate themselves to Sophie, Scott threateningly brandishes several hypodermic needles, warning the other boys to stay away from his "girlfriend". Sophie, however, informs Scott that having diabetes does not make her his girlfriend, as she is more than just that condition. This prompts a dejected Scott to retreat to a playground to mope. A sympathetic Sophie follows him to commiserate with him over the difficulties diabetics like them live with each day. She tells him that she is glad she now has a friend who understands these issues, and that even though she missed the latest episode of The Mandalorian, she somewhat likes The Scott Malkinson Show.

A closing title card informs the viewer that the streaming rights for The Scott Malkinson Show are now available, complete with an actual phone number with which prospective buyers can contact Trey Parker, much to the frustration of Clark.

== Critical reception ==
Ryan Parker of The Hollywood Reporter noted the "ultra meta direction" of the episode, in particular Clark Malkinson's complaint of shows lacking in ideas that employ shows within shows, a practice that Parker observed South Park had made throughout the season, including in this episode. Parker thought the closing title card was the best gag in the episode. He related that the phone number provided was a real Fairplay, Colorado number to a recording of Trey Parker providing buying options for the faux series seen during the season; a reference to the then-recent $500 million acquisition by HBO Max of the American streaming rights to South Park, which were previously held by Hulu.
