= The Hobbit (South Park) =

- South Park episode
- Episode no.: Season 17; Episode 10
- Directed by: Trey Parker
- Written by: Trey Parker
- Production code: 1710
- Original air date: December 11, 2013

Episode chronology
← Previous "Titties and Dragons"	Next → "Go Fund Yourself"
- South Park season 17

"The Hobbit" is the tenth and final episode in the seventeenth season of the American animated television series South Park. The 247th episode of the series overall, it premiered on Comedy Central in the United States on December 11, 2013. The story centers upon Wendy Testaburger's attempts to raise awareness of media impact on body image, which leads to a crusade by rapper Kanye West to convince the world that his then-fiancée, Kim Kardashian, is not a hobbit, but in the process proves she is. The episode received largely positive reviews from critics, who praised Wendy's story arc and the return of West.

== Plot ==
During cheerleading practice at South Park Elementary School, the cheerleaders realize that Lisa Berger, an insecure girl, lacks enthusiasm in her cheers. When the team captain, Wendy Testaburger, learns Lisa is infatuated with Butters Stotch, she suggests asking him on a date to help boost her confidence. When Lisa does this at lunch, Butters turns her down, saying she is "too fat" for him. When an enraged Wendy excoriates Butters for this, Butters explains that he likes women who are gorgeous like his love interest Kim Kardashian. Wendy angrily tells Butters that Kim has "the body of a hobbit", and that commercialized images of her are photoshopped to make her look attractive, which leads to the development of poor body image on the part of the general female population.

When Mr. Mackey speaks to Wendy and a devastated Butters, he instead criticizes Wendy for her comments about Kardashian, accusing her of being motivated by jealousy. As a result of this, Kardashian's fiancé Kanye West visits the fourth grade class to explain that Kardashian is in fact not a hobbit. Wendy subsequently tries to demonstrate to Butters how Photoshop is used to make people appear more attractive by altering a photo of Lisa, but instead of understanding Wendy's point that the popular image of Kim Kardashian is a fantasy, Butters instead thinks that the altered image of Lisa represents her true appearance. Horrified at the realization that he turned her down for a date, he uploads her altered photo to the Internet, and is about to ask her out, only to hear from Eric Cartman that she and Clyde Donovan are now dating. When Wendy sees that everyone else in school now regards Lisa's photo-shopped image as her true appearance, she tries to tell them that Lisa is actually "fat and ugly". As a result of this, she is again called into Mr. Mackey's office for her jealousy, and agrees to change her behavior in order to pacify him.

At a ceremony in which Pope Francis is named Time magazine's Person of the Year, West storms the stage to again challenge the characterization of Kardashian as a "hobbit". As Lisa's popularity in school increases, the other cheerleaders point out to Wendy that no one is noticing the rest of them any more, and ask her to produce photo-shopped images of them as well in order to increase their standing among the student body. When Wendy refuses, the cheerleaders, spurred by an increasingly shallow and haughty Lisa, photo-shop their own photos. When the boys now take notice of them, Stan Marsh asks Wendy if he can have a photo-shopped image of her, and she angrily refuses. She points out that all people have imperfections, including herself, Stan, and other students in the school, including the cheerleaders. However, the cheerleaders, Mackey, and a crowd of other students overhear the latter portion of her statement and believe she is a "hater". Wendy appears on the Channel 9 Morning News to speak out against how the media's inauthentic images of women create an unrealistic standard for girls to live up to, but she is again dismissed as a "hater". Nonetheless, she refuses to cease speaking out in favor of having photo-shopped images explicitly labeled as such.

In the middle of the night, Wendy is woken up by West, who appears in her bedroom to read her the story of a hobbit who dreamed of being beautiful. In the story, the hobbit becomes beautiful through a magical power called "Photoshop", but her true nature is exposed by a little girl who takes her Photoshop away. However, the hobbit's fiancé tells her that he loves her regardless. The story moves Wendy, who apologizes for being a "hater". Abandoning her crusade, Wendy tearfully photo-shops her image and sends it out in a mass email.

== Reception ==
Max Nicholson of IGN gave the episode a rating of 8.7 out of 10, saying, that it "ended Season 17 on a high note, thanks to a well-thought-out premise and a significant character arc for Wendy (probably her best). Meanwhile, the return of Kanye West made for a wealth of pop culture references that ranged from hilarious to decent. Overall, this year's finale was a great final bow for the season."

Ryan McGee of The A.V. Club gave the episode a B+ grade. He compared the final scene with Wendy emailing her Photoshopped picture to her classmates to the final scene in the episode "You're Getting Old," commenting that the scene "wrecked me." He went on to say, "The fact that South Park doesn't take its foot off the neck of this episode and return the world back to normal gives the entire endeavor more power."

David Crow of Den of Geek gave the episode 4 stars out of 5. He called it "the series' most biting social satire of the whole season," and praised Trey Parker and Matt Stone's ability to "tell the perfect 30-minute joke."

Danica Bellini of Mstars found the episode to be "hilarious". She listed Kanye West's inadvertent comparing of Kim Kardashian to a hobbit along with her being "Butters' perception of true female beauty" among its highlights.
