= Shots!!! =

- South Park episode
- Episode no.: Season 23; Episode 3
- Directed by: Trey Parker
- Written by: Trey Parker
- Production code: 2303
- Original air date: October 9, 2019

Episode chronology
← Previous "Band in China"	Next → "Let Them Eat Goo"
- South Park season 23

"Shots!!!" is the third episode of the twenty-third season of the American animated television series South Park. The 300th episode overall of the series, it premiered on Comedy Central in the United States on October 9, 2019. In the episode, Randy Marsh revels in a milestone reached by his marijuana farm, much to the ire of his wife. Meanwhile, in a parody of the antivaccine movement, Eric Cartman, terrified of needles, seeks to avoid a required immunization by citing fear that vaccines might make him "artistic", an eggcorn play on the word autistic, that is literally realized in the episode.

== Plot ==
Randy Marsh celebrates the milestone $300,000 in profit that his business, Tegridy Farms, has made selling marijuana by organizing a parade and producing a television commercial touting the new customer base resulting from his recent deal with the Chinese government. However his wife, Sharon, is angered at him for undertaking these endeavors without considering their cost or consulting her, despite the fact that they purchased the farm together to avoid the type of business it has now become. She is also upset that the Chinese government purchases their product to use it to frame Chinese protesters in order to justify their arrests.

Meanwhile, Eric Cartman is terrified of needles and refuses to get vaccinated his school required by running around, squealing like a pig, and evading restraints whenever a shot is imminent. Threatened with expulsion from South Park Elementary, he attempts to avoid vaccinations by lobbying to be designated a conscientious objector, citing fears that vaccines might make him "artistic" (an eggcorn of autistic). He has his mother, Liane, repeat this notion at a town meeting, but she then abandons this ruse to confess with exasperation that she simply cannot restrain him for the shot. Fearing that this may threaten the herd immunity that protects their children, the other parents in town conspire with her to ambush Cartman with a shot as he sleeps, and when this fails, they hire an expert pig wrestler, Big Mesquite Murph, who captures Cartman and places him in a pen. However, Cartman proves too fast for Big Mesquite Murph to restrain, so a rodeo is organized, which will pit the non-immunized children of Park County against those attempting to administer the required shots.

When Liane goes to Tegridy Farms to buy marijuana, she and Randy end up commiserating over the conflicts they are each having with their loved ones. When she tells him he should feel lucky at having a partner in life, he realizes he has not been kind to that partner, who is owed an apology. He apologizes not to Sharon, but to his business partner, Towelie, admitting that he became greedy, and promises to end his business deal with the Chinese. Liane, realizing that being a mother is the only thing she knows how to do, crashes the rodeo to rescue Cartman, and is accidentally stuck with the needle intended for Cartman. After freeing her son, she takes him home, but denies him the toy that children get after being immunized. Cartman later goes to his doctor himself for the shot, but is told that his mother is exhibiting side effects from the heavy dose she accidentally received, which was not intended for an adult. Eric discovers her painting a still life, horrified that the vaccine has indeed made her "artistic".

== Reception ==
Jesse Schedeen of IGN rated the episode a 6 out of 10, criticizing the episode for being a much weaker anniversary episode than the 200th episode. While he enjoyed the humor of the rodeo scene, he also stated that the episode "isn't really the epic anniversary celebration South Park deserved. The smaller scale compared to past episodes like '200' isn't the problem. It's more that 'Shots!!!' is a disjointed episode with two plot threads that barely have any relation to one another."

John Hugar of The A.V. Club was much more favorable of the episode, giving it a grade of "A", and calling it "the funniest episode of season 23 by a wide margin, and honestly, probably the best episode for pure comedy since Season 21's 'Sons a Witches'." He repeatedly praised both the story between Cartman's refusal to get vaccinated and the issues suffered by Liane in her attempts to be a good mother to Cartman, as well as the plot surrounding Randy and his marijuana farm. After commenting that the season has gotten better with each episode, he stated, "This episode gave us plenty of room to understand and relate to its characters, as well as giving us plenty of great jokes along the way. While so many of its contemporaries have gotten stale, giving viewers fewer and fewer reasons to care, South Park remains as sharp as ever."

Dani Di Placido of Forbes commented that this episode, much like the entire run of South Park, stood fast in its moral value of "refusing to sell out, or censor their stories." He praised its humor at the expense of "anti-vax conspiracy theorists" and noted in his summary that "While the 300th episode of South Park can't quite compete with the brilliance of last week's episode, the show seems to be only improving with age."
