= Season Finale (South Park) =

- South Park episode
- Episode no.: Season 23; Episode 6
- Directed by: Trey Parker
- Written by: Trey Parker
- Production code: 2306
- Original air date: November 6, 2019

Episode chronology
← Previous "Tegridy Farms Halloween Special"	Next → "Board Girls"
- South Park season 23

"Season Finale" is the sixth episode of the twenty-third season of the American animated television series South Park. Despite its name, it is not an actual season finale, though it is the last episode in the season to use the "Tegridy Farms" opening theme. The 303rd episode overall of the series, it premiered on Comedy Central in the United States on November 6, 2019. The episode parodies Donald Trump’s use of victimization tactics, as well as media censorship in China, ICE detention centers and the 2019 film Joker, continuing from previous episodes in the season.

== Plot ==
As marijuana farmer Randy Marsh and his partner Towelie are broadcasting a podcast about Tegridy Farms, police interrupt the broadcast and take away Randy, taking him to the South Park City Council. Mayor McDaniels and the council tell Randy that the Tweaks have brought video footage proving that Randy was responsible for blowing up local marijuana farms in the episode "Mexican Joker". This footage, along with other examples of Randy's behavior over the course of the episodes of the past few weeks, leave McDaniels no choice but to have Randy arrested and put in jail. When Randy's wife Sharon breaks the news to their children Stan and Shelly, they are all giddy as they realize that this may be the opportunity they have wanted to leave the farm and return to normal lives in South Park.

Meanwhile, a group of children play football in the park. During the game, fourth-grader Eric Cartman throws a pass to Jason White, but when Jason runs into the street to catch the pass, he is run over by a police car and killed. Father Maxi leads the funeral service for Jason at the church and he brings up Jason's father Robert White. Robert expresses his frustration at the lack of people who have arrived to mourn for Jason and his ongoing belief that no one cares about the Whites. At the White House, President Herbert Garrison receives a call from Randy in jail as Randy asks Garrison for help. Randy visits the jail's infirmary and complains that he is starting to feel remorse for his actions as he no longer has access to his marijuana. While there, he attempts to use a technique of blame reversal taught to him by Garrison, but it is rejected since he is not the President.

The Marsh family celebrates potentially moving back to South Park with their friends. When the Whites arrive, Robert is angry that no one brought food or properly mourned for Jason, and he is upset about the impending demise of Tegridy Farms as he was a loyal customer. When the Whites leave, Cartman runs after them and suggests to them that they consider adopting a child that has been abandoned at one of the ICE detention centers, where Cartman had previously seen children in need. The Whites look at several children who are displayed similarly to animals in an animal shelter, and decide to adopt a "pure-bred Mexican". The White family names the boy Alejandro, and share with him their feelings about how everyone else will not care about the Whites and that he will experience this for himself. As they watch television, President Garrison and his attorney Rudy Giuliani speak out against the charges made against Randy Marsh and call on people to make their voices louder. Robert promises to take action for his family, while at the same time disciplining Alejandro for attempting to make a cellphone call to Mexico after 7 pm, their designated cutoff time for phone usage. When Alejandro refuses to join the Whites in a protest in support of Randy, the Whites decide to get Alejandro his own child to adopt from an ICE detention center. Their continued discipline of Alejandro along with responding to all of his Spanish statements with "Bien, gracias, ¿y tú?" (translating to "Good, thanks, and you?") makes Alejandro grow increasingly angry. In a therapy session in jail, Randy shares that his moral values are lower due to him comparing his values to that of the President, and that as long as his values were better than the President's, he should be okay. Randy is later visited in jail by Giuliani who gives Randy a marijuana cigarette.

Randy's arraignment begins and most of the citizens of South Park arrive in support of Randy being convicted, chanting "lock him up". The Whites are the only ones who are protesting in support of Randy. As Randy begins to use a defense given to him by Garrison and Giuliani, who are also present at the arraignment, he gives up on their defense strategy. He states that the marijuana given to him by Giuliani was poor quality, and it reminded him of why he got into marijuana farming in the first place. As Randy extols the virtues of his marijuana farming, a series of explosions occur outside. Alejandro, who now has his face covered in white sunscreen put on him by Robert, is on a rampage of destruction in the town, and the police believe he is now the Mexican Joker. They attempt to shoot Alejandro but he escapes. Randy is exonerated of all charges and solely thanks the Whites for their support. At Tegridy Farms, snow begins to fall as Randy tells his family that this year's marijuana farming season has now ended due to the colder weather. He turns to a camera which has been filming all of this and thanks the viewers for their support of Tegridy Farms as he announces the harvest's last crop of the season for sale, which he has named Season Finale.

== Reception ==
Jesse Schedeen of IGN gave the episode a score of 8.5 out of 10, praising how the episode managed to tie loose ends in a satisfying way, and explaining, "It may not actually be the season finale, but this South Park episode succeeds in bringing together a number of ongoing plot threads and bringing the Tegridy Farms saga to a close. Some of the material involving the White family grows repetitive, but this is still one of the stronger chapters of Season 23 so far."

John Hugar of The A.V. Club gave the episode a B and called it "entertaining," stating, "'Season Finale' was an enjoyable episode, and while it let Randy off the hook a little too easily, its well-executed twist ending, and the memorable return of Trump/Garrison made it quite a worthwhile affair."
