= Taming Strange =

- South Park episode
- Episode no.: Season 17; Episode 5
- Directed by: Trey Parker
- Written by: Trey Parker
- Production code: 1705
- Original air date: October 30, 2013

Guest appearance
- Bill Hader as Plex

Episode chronology
← Previous "Goth Kids 3: Dawn of the Posers"	Next → "Ginger Cow"
- South Park season 17

"Taming Strange" is the fifth episode in the seventeenth season of the American animated television series South Park. The 242nd episode of the series overall, it premiered on Comedy Central in the United States on October 30, 2013. This episode parodies Miley Cyrus' controversial performance at the 2013 MTV Video Music Awards through the use of the children's television program Yo Gabba Gabba!, as well as the technical problems encountered during the launch of the HealthCare.gov website. The plot centers on Kyle trying to bond with his baby brother Ike, who is experiencing early-onset puberty.

== Plot ==
At South Park Elementary, Mr. Mackey announces to the students that the school will be operating entirely on a new computer interface system called Intellilink, but his demonstration of the system shows that it does not work properly. Meanwhile, a rift has opened between Kyle Broflovski and his brother Ike, who, as a result of undergoing precocious puberty, has become hostile towards Kyle. Kyle is told by Mackey that Canadians, like Ike, may experience puberty differently, and the two boys view a Canadian public health film, in which the Canadian Minister of Health explains that sexual reproduction among Canadians involves a woman queefing in a man's face. When informed by someone off camera that this is wrong, the Canadian Minister of Health confronts his wife over the fact that she once explained to him that she queefed in his face for this reason. She explains that she was being sarcastic, out of anger that Terry has refused to attend relationship counseling with her. All of this is shown in the film, which fails to resolve Kyle and Ike's problem.

As the Intellilink malfunctions continue, an engineer (Cody) shows up at the school and suggests to Mackey that the school upgrade to the Intellilink Silver package, to which Mackey agrees. Kyle takes Ike to a live Yo Gabba Gabba! show, where Ike takes to the stage, and tells the titular characters that his "Cool Cool Trick" is to "tame Foofa's strange", before removing his clothes and grinding against one of the characters, Foofa, much to the horror of the other characters and everyone in the audience. When Ike and Kyle are subsequently scolded by the other characters for this, Ike says that Foofa is an attractive woman, and should not be limiting herself to children. Foofa shocks the others when she agrees with this, saying that she wishes to play to adult audiences and add sex appeal to her persona.

At South Park Elementary, the school faculty tell Mackey that Intellilink is a disaster, but Mackey dismisses this criticism and informs the faculty that he has hired a new faculty member, Pat Conners, to oversee the system. As soon as Conners sits down, however, Mackey excoriates her for failing to take responsibility for the malfunctioning system that she has only just been placed in charge of and fires her. He then announces that the school will upgrade to the Intellilink Gold package.

Meanwhile, Foofa and her new manager, Ike, have been cultivating a new, adult image for her and plan for her to give a raunchy performance at the MTV Video Music Awards. Foofa's Yo Gabba Gabba! castmates, along with Sinéad O'Connor, try to talk her out of this but are unsuccessful, and Ike continues his derisive treatment of Kyle. Kyle is then contacted by the Canadian Minister of Health and learns that because the Canadian health care system is also managed by Intellilink, Ike has mistakenly been given NFL football player Tom Brady's hormones, while Brady has been given the medication for Ike's laxatives. When Kyle informs the Canadian Minister of Health that Intellilink does not work, he becomes angrily defensive, asserting that Intellilink works fine and needs to be given time to work, adding that Kyle sounds like his wife. The Canadian Minister of Health and his friend realize that it is the health care system's integration with Intellilink was functioning properly the entire time, which causes the minister becomes defensive and hostile, and that this is what led to his marital problems.

At South Park Elementary, Intellilink's failure to work properly continues, and Mackey angrily tells the engineer that he simply wants the school's resources to work properly. The engineer recommends upgrading to Intellilink's Centurion package, which involves removing the system entirely from the school, ending the school's use of it entirely. When Mackey reluctantly accepts this, the engineer removes all the Intellilink hardware and software from the building and burns it, before pulling out a pistol and shooting himself in the head.

Backstage at the MTV Video Music Awards, Foofa is about to give her performance when Kyle arrives. When Ike asks him why Kyle cannot just leave him alone, Kyle says it is because Ike is his little brother, and even when Kyle is 50 and Ike is 45, Ike will still be his little brother, a statement that gives Ike to pause for a moment. Kyle then sincerely tells Ike that he doesn't care if Ike wishes to grow up, as long as he is there by his side when he does so. Realizing Kyle is right, Ike tells Foofa that while rebellion is part of growing up, he would rather let it happen naturally instead of pushing it. Foofa, by contrast, takes to the stage in a revealing outfit and sings "Pound My Sweet Strange".

In Canada, the Minister of Health returns home and makes amends with his wife. In South Park, Kyle is happy to see that the effects of Ike's early puberty have faded and that he has returned to normal. However, as the two watch television, Ike still remarks that Dora the Explorer "has that hot Puerto Rican strange."

== Production ==
Series co-creators Trey Parker and Matt Stone called this episode one of their favorites from season seventeen, mainly because it contains a large amount of the Canadian humor that has been featured prominently throughout South Park's history, an example of which is the character "Fancy Fwend", so called in the script but only identified as the Canadian health minister's friend in the episode itself. Parker and Stone had such affection for the character that they tried to feature him in subsequent episodes and considered making an entire episode devoted to the character.

Parker and Stone reveal on the DVD commentary for this episode that Intellilink was originally only directly spoofing Crestron, a real product, identical to Intellilink, that Parker and Stone had experienced problems with in the past. They were glad that they could spoof Obamacare as well because they thought not a lot of people would know what Crestron actually was, calling it a "rich people problem".

Much time was spent during the production cycle by Stone and Bill Hader educating Parker about Yo Gabba Gabba! because Parker had little knowledge on the subject.

== Reception ==
Max Nicholson of IGN saw the episode as part of a pattern of recent South Park episodes that start off with a strong concept, but which do not yield successful results throughout the rest of the episode, referencing the Ike puberty and Canadian Board of Health storylines specifically. While Nicholson thought that some of the gags were funny, he thought that overall, there were fewer of them. Nicholson thought the use of Yo Gabba Gabba! to comment on Miley Cyrus' "Wrecking Ball" video and her performance at the 2013 MTV Video Music Awards served little purpose in the episode, and that the commentary on Obamacare at the end of the episode felt like an afterthought.

The A.V. Club's Marcus Gilmer awarded the episode a grade of B−, summarizing his review with: "Despite some good laughs, it wastes a great premise by trying to do too much. Sometimes, it's okay to just slim it down and let the jokes fly. Sometimes, it's okay to leave the real world out of it; the show has always done just fine staying within its own universe."
