= Let Go, Let Gov =

- South Park episode
- Episode no.: Season 17; Episode 1
- Directed by: Trey Parker
- Written by: Trey Parker
- Production code: 1701
- Original air date: September 25, 2013

Guest appearance
- Bill Hader as Alec Baldwin

Episode chronology
| ← Previous "Obama Wins!" | Next → "Informative Murder Porn" |
- South Park season 17

"Let Go, Let Gov" is the first episode in the seventeenth season of the American animated television series South Park. The 238th episode of the series overall, it first aired on Comedy Central in the United States on September 25, 2013. The episode's story satirizes the 2013 mass surveillance disclosures, and casts Eric Cartman in an Edward Snowden-like role, in which he infiltrates the NSA in protest of the agency's surveillance of American citizens.

== Plot ==
Kyle Broflovski grows increasingly irritated at Eric Cartman's habit of having indiscreet phone conversations while using the speakerphone function of his phone. When he complains about this to Cartman, Cartman accuses Kyle of invading his privacy, and comes to suspect that Kyle is an agent of the National Security Agency (NSA), which Cartman believes is tracking the movements of American citizens. When Butters Stotch learns this, he begins worshipping the government and praying to them to keep his friends safe.

Cartman acquires a new social media device called Shitter, which is being advertised on TV by Alec Baldwin (Bill Hader). The device broadcasts a user's thoughts audibly and sends them directly to the Internet without the use of a phone. Cartman decides to use this device while infiltrating the NSA in order to broadcast his thoughts to the Internet. Meanwhile, Butters goes to a Colorado Department of Motor Vehicles office and confesses his sins to the person behind the counter. He is subsequently visited by two Jehovah's Witnesses. Butters shares with them the truth about the government and the three of them begin sharing DMV literature with their neighbors. Eventually, others begin showing up at the DMV to confess their sins.

Cartman goes to the NSA headquarters impersonating a job applicant under the name Bill Clinton. The NSA chief hires him to help monitor emails and phone conversations. Cartman is irritated to learn that he himself is not being monitored by the NSA and he tries unsuccessfully to convince the chief that Eric Cartman is really a threat. The chief explains that the NSA cannot change someone's status in the Central Computer. When Cartman questions this, the chief reveals the mechanism by which the NSA monitors citizens: they have Santa Claus imprisoned and hooked up to their computers. Cartman then reveals his true identity, telling the chief that he will inform the public of the truth.

Cartman is subsequently heartbroken to learn that nobody cares that the NSA is monitoring them. He is consoled by Butters, who convinces him to join the group at the DMV. However, shortly afterwards, the DMV is shut down due to rampant allegations of sexual abuse with minors. An anchorman for WMZ News directs Americans to confess their wrongdoings at their nearest post office, but then receives the breaking development that the United States Postal Service has been shut down following the same type of allegations. The anchorman says that it now appears that the only ones who can be trusted with the public's confessions and guidance is the local news station. The anchorman concludes his report by saying, "WMZ News will be back in...a young boy."

== Critical reception ==
Max Nicholson of IGN gave the episode a score of 6.7 out of 10, saying that "the beginning of 'Let Go, Let Gov' featured the best jokes from this storyline" and that "as the arc progressed, the episode veered more and more into preachy territory." Marcus Gilmer of The A.V. Club gave "Let Go, Let Gov" a C−, saying that "instead of reaching for some sort of sharp satire, there's a settling for an easy, cheap joke." He adds that the central story-line about the NSA "wanders a bit with stale riffs and a lackadaisical payoff".
