= World War Zimmerman =

- South Park episode
- Episode no.: Season 17; Episode 3
- Directed by: Trey Parker
- Written by: Trey Parker
- Production code: 1703
- Original air date: October 9, 2013

Episode chronology
← Previous "Informative Murder Porn"	Next → "Goth Kids 3: Dawn of the Posers"
- South Park season 17

"World War Zimmerman" is the third episode in the seventeenth season of the American animated television series South Park. The 240th episode of the series overall, it premiered on Comedy Central in the United States on October 9, 2013. The episode parodies the 2013 film World War Z and the killing of Trayvon Martin by George Zimmerman.

== Plot ==
Eric Cartman draws attention by acting unusually nice to Token Black, and having nightmares while asleep in class. When his counselor, Mr. Mackey, questions him, Cartman says he thinks Token is a "ticking time bomb". It is revealed that his nightmares feature himself as Brad Pitt's character in the feature film World War Z, with the role of the zombies in that film being played by African Americans, including Token, who are rioting after the verdict of the Zimmerman trial. With Mackey's encouragement, Cartman reads a poem to Token, and later performs a musical adaptation of it at a student assembly, disavowing any involvement with the Zimmerman case. When Token takes offense at the notion that he should feel bad because of Cartman's feelings, Cartman, feeling the "outbreak has started", goes to his house for his survival kit, picks up a random woman, and commandeers a passenger plane at an airport, warning the passengers they can only stop the end of the world by finding a place where the "contagion" cannot reach them.

On the airplane, Cartman discovers a black passenger in the bathroom, and barricades him in. When the passenger tries to break out, the other passengers begin to panic, causing the plane to crash in the Rocky Mountains. Cartman and the woman survive and go to Jimbo's gun store to purchase a rifle to kill Token, but Jimbo informs him he can not shoot anybody unless he is threatened in his own home. After considering this, Cartman and the woman head for Florida to shoot George Zimmerman, as a way to stop the outbreak. She is run over and killed. Cartman goes to Zimmermans' house wearing black paint on his face. Zimmerman shoots Cartman, to the praise of the officials for apparently saving them, before one of the agents discovers that Cartman is white. Zimmerman is tried, found guilty, and executed via electrocution for attempted murder.

Cartman survives the shooting, and back in South Park, he apologizes to Token, who is upset. Cartman then tricks Token into moving close enough to shoot him in accordance with the stand-your-ground law. At school, Cartman is sent to Mackey's office along with a bandaged Token. When Mackey demands that the two apologize to each other in order to resolve their "feud", Token angrily denounces the stand-your-ground law for not also applying to black people. Once more, Cartman panics and flees, causing yet another plane to crash.

== Production ==
The animation for Cartman's dream sequences was completed very early in the production cycle of the season, as series co-creators Trey Parker and Matt Stone came up with the idea on the annual "writers retreat" during the break between seasons sixteen and seventeen. They intended to expand on the dream sequence and use it for the season's premiere episode. They originally intended the episode to consist almost entirely of the dream sequence and reveal this at the end by having Cartman wake up. Parker was pleased that they ultimately decided against the idea because this episode is one of the very few that Parker's father told him he did not understand. Parker felt this would have been worsened if they had remained with their original idea, concluding that his father disliked the episode because he had not seen World War Z.

Commenting on how the writers were pleased with the episode, Parker said that the season's third episode is usually when the writers have “shaken off the rust”. Token being shot towards the end of the episode was originally going to be expanded into a permanent death because The Simpsons had done a similar story, but it was quickly decided against because Parker and Stone "love having Token around".

== Reception ==
In its original American broadcast, "World War Zimmerman" was watched by 2.056 million overall households, according to Nielsen Media Research. The episode received a 1.2 rating/5 share among adults aged between 18 and 49.

Marcus Gilmer of The A.V. Club gave the episode an "A−", saying, "Some of those moments were brutal but it in a meaningful, impactful, and, yes, even funny way. That's what satire does when it works: It scorches."

Max Nicholson of IGN graded the episode an 8.7 out of 10 and opined that "I always know it's a great episode of South Park when I have to walk on eggshells just to review it." He praised the "great social commentary" and concluded that the episode was "a return to form for South Park".

Chris Longo of Den of Geek gave the episode four and a half stars out of five. He described it as featuring "classic Cartman" and concluded by saying "when South Park took an extended hiatus, we dreamed it would pay off in well-thought out, precisely executed performances like these. Bravo, Matt and Trey."

Josh Kurp of Uproxx described being left "speechless", and compared Cartman's behavior in the episode to his acts in the fifth season episode "Scott Tenorman Must Die".
