= South Park season 23 =

Season of television series

South Park
- Season 23
- Home media release cover
- No. of episodes: 10

Release
- Original network: Comedy Central
- Original release: September 25 – December 11, 2019

Season chronology
- ← Previous; Season 22 Next → Season 24

The twenty-third season of the American animated sitcom series South Park premiered on Comedy Central on September 25, 2019, and concluded on December 11, 2019 after 10 episodes aired. This season contained the series' 300th episode; the milestone was reached on October 9, 2019, when the third episode of the season premiered. Like previous seasons, this season also had dark weeks (weeks during which no new episode would air), after episodes four and seven. Trey Parker and Matt Stone continued to write, direct, and edit every episode the week prior to air, as the duo has done since the series' debut.

Similar to previous seasons, the season features continuing elements and a recurring storyline for the first six episodes while lampooning ICE detention centers, the 2019 film Joker, media censorship in China, the anti-vaccine movement, plant based food, the Trump Administration, transgender people in sports, and the competition between traditional cable television and media streaming.

== Production ==
On July 8, 2015, two months prior to the season 19 premiere, Comedy Central announced they had renewed South Park for an additional 30 episodes over three seasons. This renewal was in addition to the two-year contract already in place with Parker and Stone, guaranteeing South Park would air until at least 2019. On September 12, 2019, the show was renewed for seasons 24 through 26 until 2022.

== Main theme ==
This season had multiple changes to the traditional theme song from the show. For the first six episodes of the season, an overall story arc focusing on Randy Marsh's marijuana farm named Tegridy Farms was featured. During these episodes, the theme song's lyrics and graphics were changed to focus on Tegridy Farms and also featured vocals by Randy Marsh and Towelie. In the episode "Board Girls", the regular theme was completely abandoned and replaced with a theme about the PC Babies, the politically correct children of PC Principal and Vice Principal Strong Woman. In the "Turd Burglars" episode, the theme returned to the show, but starring the women of South Park, in a fictional show titled "One for the Ladies". In the "Basic Cable" episode, the theme was abandoned again and replaced with a faux intro titled "The Scott Malkinson Show". The traditional theme song was put back in on the final episode "Christmas Snow".

== Controversy ==
On October 7, 2019, South Park was reportedly banned from the Chinese Internet with videos, mentions, and discussion forums for the animated series being removed and shut down in response to episode 2 of the season, "Band in China". Later in the day South Park creators Trey Parker and Matt Stone mockingly apologized.

== Episodes ==
No. overall	No. in season	Title	Directed by	Written by	Original release date	Prod. code	U.S. viewers (millions)
298	1	"Mexican Joker"	Trey Parker	Trey Parker	September 25, 2019	2301	0.92
When Tegridy Farms' sales decline, Randy is angered and decides to take action. Kyle is sent to an ICE detention center by Cartman and warns the agents there that their poor treatment of children may have consequences.
299	2	"Band in China"	Trey Parker	Trey Parker	October 2, 2019	2302	0.73
Randy wants to sell his marijuana in the Chinese market but is imprisoned after marijuana is found in his luggage. Stan, Kenny, Jimmy and Butters form a death metal band, which attracts a filmmaker that wants to tailor their biopic for Chinese audiences.
300	3	"Shots!!!"	Trey Parker	Trey Parker	October 9, 2019	2303	0.95
In the series' 300th episode, Sharon is angered by the self-centered endeavors with which Randy chooses to celebrate a milestone achieved by their farm. Cartman's fear of needles prompts him to express fears that vaccines might make him "artistic".
301	4	"Let Them Eat Goo"	Trey Parker	Trey Parker	October 16, 2019	2304	0.77
After a decrease in marijuana sales, Randy decides to take advantage of plant-based food to sell more of it. Cartman suffers from a heart attack after the cafeteria changes to a plant-based diet.
302	5	"Tegridy Farms Halloween Special"	Trey Parker	Trey Parker	October 30, 2019	2305	0.84
Randy's daughter Shelly has issues with Randy and his marijuana farming. Butters has a problem with a mummy who is very manipulative in their relationship.
303	6	"Season Finale"	Trey Parker	Trey Parker	November 6, 2019	2306	0.84
Randy is accused of bombing private marijuana fields, and wants President Garrison to help him defend himself; the White family adopts two kids detained by ICE after the death of their son.
304	7	"Board Girls"	Trey Parker	Trey Parker	November 13, 2019	2307	0.85
Strong Woman deals with a transgender athlete who has her own agenda. When the girls want to join a boys' gaming club, the boys object but the girls prove to be strong gamers.
305	8	"Turd Burglars"	Trey Parker	Trey Parker	November 27, 2019	2308	0.66
Kyle begins worrying over the fact that he has millions of microbes living all over him. Cartman, Kenny and Stan steal feces from Sheila in exchange for the new Star Wars game.
306	9	"Basic Cable"	Trey Parker	Trey Parker	December 4, 2019	2309	0.80
Scott Malkinson's hopes of romance with new girl Sophie depend on him getting the streaming platform Disney+, but Scott's dad Clark embarks on a mission to stop streaming shows in South Park.
307	10	"Christmas Snow"	Trey Parker	Trey Parker	December 11, 2019	2310	0.81
Santa visits South Park and takes all the joy out of Christmas with his warnings about driving under the influence. Randy helps the townspeople get into the festive spirit by selling them cocaine.

== Reception ==
On Rotten Tomatoes, the season holds a 50% approval rating based on 6 reviews.

== Home media ==
The season was released in its entirety on DVD and Blu-ray on June 23, 2020.

== See also ==
- South Park (Park County, Colorado)
- South Park City
