= South Park season 17 =

Season of television series

South Park
- Season 17
- Home media release cover
- No. of episodes: 10

Release
- Original network: Comedy Central
- Original release: September 25 – December 11, 2013

Season chronology
- ← Previous; Season 16 Next → Season 18

The seventeenth season of the animated television series South Park was announced on May 10, 2013, that premiered on Comedy Central on September 25, 2013, and ended on December 11, 2013. The season satirized various topics and cultural institutions including Minecraft, the George Zimmerman murder trials, the 2013 mass surveillance disclosures, and the HBO television fantasy drama, Game of Thrones. The season received generally positive reviews, with criticism mainly aimed at the start of the season and much praise going to the Black Friday trilogy, which was hailed by IGN to be the show's best multi-arc series since the Imaginationland trilogy. The series continually maintained high ratings throughout the season.

== Production ==
The season consists of 10 episodes, as series creators Trey Parker and Matt Stone decided to scale back and have one uninterrupted season, as opposed to two 7-episode runs, as had been the format since Season 8. Bill Hader, a former Saturday Night Live cast member, began working full-time on the show as a staff writer.

Due to a power outage at the studio, episode 4 ("Goth Kids 3: Dawn of the Posers") missed the deadline and aired a week later than scheduled.

== Episodes ==
No. overall	No. in season	Title	Directed by	Written by	Original release date	Prod. code	U.S. viewers (millions)
238	1	"Let Go, Let Gov"	Trey Parker	Trey Parker	September 25, 2013	1701	2.89
Cartman infiltrates the National Security Agency and does not like what he learns. Butters uses the local DMV office to confess his sins.
239	2	"Informative Murder Porn"	Trey Parker	Trey Parker	October 2, 2013	1702	2.49
The boys become concerned over the growing rate of copycat incidents involving "murder porn" and use Minecraft to distract parents from hurting each other.
240	3	"World War Zimmerman"	Trey Parker	Trey Parker	October 9, 2013	1703	2.06
Cartman fears for his and humanity's future after learning that George Zimmerman was found not guilty for killing Trayvon Martin.
241	4	"Goth Kids 3: Dawn of the Posers"	Trey Parker	Trey Parker	October 23, 2013	1704	1.83
When Henrietta, one of the Goth kids, is sent out to a camp she returns deeply changed as an emo kid. The rest of the goth kids seek help from the Vampire kids.
242	5	"Taming Strange"	Trey Parker	Trey Parker	October 30, 2013	1705	1.89
When Ike experiences early puberty, he develops an antisocial personality. The Canadian Minister of Health experiences marriage problems, while Mr. Mackey has a new computer-integrated technology system in the school which is fraught with technical errors.
243	6	"Ginger Cow"	Trey Parker	Trey Parker	November 6, 2013	1706	2.39
Cartman's latest prank brings about the necessary spiritual conditions for world peace. Cartman and Kyle are the only two at odds as the world embarks upon a thousand years of peace and harmony.
244	7	"Black Friday"	Trey Parker	Trey Parker	November 13, 2013	1707	2.07
Part one of three. In anticipation of a Black Friday sale, Randy takes a temporary job as a mall security guard. The children split over which gaming system to buy, and Stan and Kyle find themselves on opposite sides.
245	8	"A Song of Ass and Fire"	Trey Parker	Trey Parker	November 20, 2013	1708	2.39
Part two of three. Hordes of shoppers gather outside the mall in anticipation of the Black Friday sales. The kids prepare for an epic battle to assert the superiority of one faction's favorite video game platform over the other.
246	9	"Titties and Dragons"	Trey Parker	Trey Parker	December 4, 2013	1709	2.48
Part three of three. Cartman and Kyle decide to give up and fight as one for their video game system.
247	10	"The Hobbit"	Trey Parker	Trey Parker	December 11, 2013	1710	2.17
Wendy's criticism of Kim Kardashian as a "hobbit" leads her to speak out publicly. It also results in a crusade by Kanye West who tries to convince the world that Kardashian is not a hobbit.

== See also ==
- South Park (Park County, Colorado)
- South Park City
