= Board Girls =

- South Park episode
- Episode no.: Season 23; Episode 7
- Directed by: Trey Parker
- Written by: Trey Parker
- Production code: 2307
- Original air date: November 13, 2019

Episode chronology
← Previous "Season Finale"	Next → "Turd Burglars"
- South Park season 23

"Board Girls" is the seventh episode of the twenty-third season of the American animated television series South Park. The 304th episode overall of the series, it premiered on Comedy Central in the United States on November 13, 2019. The episode argues that discussion of transgender athletes is made difficult by political correctness.

== Plot ==
The show opens with a new theme song dedicated to the PC babies, who are the highly politically correct quintuplet children of South Park Elementary principal PC Principal and vice-principal Strong Woman. At South Park Elementary, PC Principal announces that Woman will be competing in a strongwoman competition where she is the reigning champion. She encourages the girls of the school to be more active in school sports and activities.

Fourth-graders Eric Cartman, Stan Marsh, Butters Stotch, Clyde Donovan and Scott Malkinson are in a gaming club named Dice Studz playing Dungeons & Dragons. They are interrupted by school counselor Mr. Mackey who brings in Tammy Nelson and Nichole Daniels who wish to join. Although the boys are hesitant to let the girls play, the girls immediately display an advanced knowledge of the game that stuns the boys. Cartman, Butters and Scott complain to Mackey about the girls in their club but they are dismissed. The boys collectively decide to switch their games to tabletop miniature games to make their games too difficult for the girls to play, but the girls come in immediately prepared for the game, and Stan becomes more comfortable with the girls' presence.

Cartman, Butters and Scott plead to the United States Congress to return their club to the way that it was. In response, the girls start up their own gaming club named Board Girls which is hugely popular. The boys are fascinated by their new club, but Mackey kicks them out of the club as a new rule in school no longer allows boys in girls clubs, a direct result of the boys pleas to Congress.

At the strongwoman competition, Woman is interviewed and told that there is a new transgender athlete competing named Heather Swanson, an extremely muscular, bearded athlete (a parody of "Macho Man" Randy Savage) who only started identifying as a woman two weeks ago. Swanson easily dominates the competition, with Woman finishing in a distant second. Swanson visits Woman and Principal at their home to brag about his victory and gets into an argument with Principal, calling him a "transphobe". Swanson has an interview on a sports talk show with multiple trophies and awards as he has won every women's sporting contest he has entered recently. He issues a challenge to Woman, who is watching on television at home. Woman reveals to Principal that she personally knows Swanson as her ex-boyfriend Blade Jaggart, who felt that he was beaten by a woman when they broke up and is now lying that he is a transgender woman so he can beat her in women's sports. As Swanson has an interview celebrating his success in mixed martial arts, Principal interrupts him on set causing another argument. In the heat of the moment, Principal shoves Swanson, and he dives through a table, breaking it.

Principal's reputation is damaged from his actions, and Woman consoles him in a park as Principal does not want to face his babies due to his actions. Principal decides to invite Swanson to South Park Elementary as a motivational speaker in an attempt to make up for his actions. As Swanson brags about his ability to beat any woman at any contest, the girls from Board Girls retort that he would be unable to beat any of them in some of their favorite games. Swanson accepts their challenge and is repeatedly defeated by the Board Girls in various games. Swanson leaves in anger as Cartman invites Swanson to make their own club instead. Principal returns home and finds that his children have accepted his actions as they simply do not care.

== Reception ==
Jesse Schedeen of IGN gave the episode a score of 7.4 out of 10, praising how it shifts away from current events, and stating, "As we've seen over and over, South Park is generally better off when it doesn't try to rip storylines directly from current headlines but instead strives to be topical yet evergreen."

Chris Longo with Den of Geek gave the episode 3 out of 5 stars and commented that the episode "left a lot to be desired," especially pointing to the use of the Randy Savage parody to comment on transgender criticism as "irresponsible and sloppy in its setup and bows out when it has the chance to wade into the grey area of its intended social commentary."

The episode was denounced as "transphobic" by multiple reviewers and LGBTQ publications, who accused it of mocking transgender athletes.
