= Randy Marsh (South Park) =

South Park character

- South Park character
- First appearance: "Volcano" (1997)
- Created by: Trey Parker; Matt Stone
- Designed by: Trey Parker; Matt Stone
- Voiced by: Trey Parker; Sia (vocals of Randy as Lorde in "The Cissy"); Patrick Stewart ("Something You Can Do with Your Finger")

In-universe information
- Aliases: Steamy Ray Vaughn; Lorde; The Amazingly Randy; Karen Marsh
- Occupation: Cannabis farmer and owner of Tegridy Farms and its subsidiary Tegridy Burger (seasons 22–27); Geologist (seasons 1–22); Singer-songwriter (season 18); Head coach of the Denver Broncos ("Sarcastaball"); School Chef ("Crème Fraîche"); OnlyFans content creator ("South Park (Not Suitable for Children)")
- Spouse: Sharon Marsh (wife)
- Children: Stan Marsh (son); Shelley Marsh (daughter)
- Relatives: Marvin Marsh (father); Jimbo Kern (brother-in-law)
- Nationality: American
- Residence: 260 Avenue de los Mexicanos, South Park, Colorado, United States (current); Tegridy Farms (former)

Randy S. Marsh is a fictional character in the American adult animated sitcom South Park. He is the most prominent parent on the series and a married father who raises his son Stan and daughter Shelley along with his wife Sharon in the fictional town of South Park, Colorado. Randy's first name and original job as a geologist are derived from the series co-creator Trey Parker's father, and Parker describes Randy as "the biggest dingbat in the entire show". According to the season 16 episode "Reverse Cowgirl", the Marsh home address was 260 Avenue de los Mexicanos until their move to Tegridy Farms in season 22.

In tradition with South Park's animation style, Randy is composed of simple geometrical shapes, animated with the use of a computer, and rendered to mimic the appearance of construction paper cutout compositions animated through the use of stop motion, which was the technique used to animate the Spirit of Christmas short films. Randy is voiced by Trey Parker.

== Character ==
=== Creation and design ===
Randy is 45 years old, and like Parker's father, is a geologist, making his first appearance in the series while monitoring a seismometer in the episode "Volcano". Randy was depicted to work at the South Park Center for Seismic Activity, and was later shown to work for the U.S. Geological Survey, starting with the season 8 episode "Goobacks". He was briefly fired from his geologist job near the end of the season 12 and quit briefly during the end of the season 14, but was subsequently rehired both times. Randy also serves on the city council, specializing in the town's parks and public grounds.

=== Biography and traits ===
A recurring character trait of Randy's is his being prone to overreacting and obsessively seizing upon irrational ideas and fads, whether by himself or as part of a large contingent of the town's adult population.

Among the endeavors on which Randy sometimes embarks are get-rich quick schemes or other strategies for economic or material gain. In "Something Wall-Mart This Way Comes", he took a job as an associate at Wal-Mart. In "A Nightmare on Face Time", Randy buys the closed Blockbuster Video in town, hoping to turn it around. In "Black Friday", he takes a job as a security guard at the town's shopping mall during the Black Friday to infiltrate the mall before the stampede of shoppers.

Randy has known his wife, Sharon, since childhood. Taking liberties with its floating timeline, the show establishes Randy and Sharon as being young adults during the flower power era. They maintain steady friendships with the parents of Stan's friends and are revealed as enjoying the act of watching pornography together to enhance their sexual relationship. However, their marriage has not been without its frequent arguments, which are usually instigated when Sharon is annoyed, ashamed, or disgusted by Randy's eccentricities. The two briefly divorced on two occasions, but quickly reconciled both times. Randy tends to showcase liberal viewpoints, having protested the 2003 invasion of Iraq and supported Barack Obama during the 2008 presidential race.

Randy dropped out of high school and was a member of a boyband in his teens, as shown in "Something You Can Do with Your Finger", but he has mentioned that he attended college and has been indicated to hold a doctorate. The show frequently depicts Randy to be a moderate to heavy drinker, and numerous episodes have dealt with Randy's belligerent and negligent behavior brought upon by his severe intoxication.

A few instances of personal achievement have made Randy a hero in the eyes of his friends and fellow townsfolk, such as being awarded a Nobel Prize and twice setting a record for producing the world's largest piece of human excrement. Randy has conversely been subjected to ridicule from the entire town, ranging from when he inadvertently accelerated the effects of global warming by suggesting the entire populace take on a more uninhibited approach to passing gas to avoid the hazard of spontaneous combustion to when he reluctantly exclaimed "niggers" while attempting to solve a puzzle during a live broadcast of Wheel of Fortune. In addition to the professional singing he did in his youth, Randy can also play guitar, as seen in "Guitar Queer-O". He can also speak a little Mongolian, having learned some in college, as seen in the episode "Child Abduction Is Not Funny".

The episode "Gluten Free Ebola" revealed that Randy produces music and performs as the noted musician Lorde, a fact that was explored subsequently in "The Cissy". This has become a running gag that has continued through multiple episodes, such as suggesting much of the Marsh family's income comes from his music career as Lorde rather than his geology job. As of season 22, Randy quit his job and moved the family to the countryside, where he sets up Tegridy Farms to grow and distribute cannabis. Throughout season 23, Randy engages in increasingly unethical business practices until he is sent to prison in "Season Finale"; though Randy is eventually released, he vows to no longer engage in illegal activities, though the cannabis season ends shortly after his release. In "Christmas Snow", Randy begins selling cocaine during the winter, which he has legalized in multiple states so that he can farm it. The Tegridy storyline ended when Randy sold the farm and moved back to South Park in "Sickofancy".

== Family ==
Randy is the father of two children: 10-year-old son Stan and 13-year-old daughter Shelley. Randy is generally a doting, well-meaning father to Stan, though their relationship has become strained in the several instances when Randy's irrational behavior and periodic alcoholism aggravate his son. As a result, Stan is usually led to question his father's intelligence. Randy has also taken an interest in learning how to play the same computer and video games Stan enjoys. Randy has a habit of temporarily favoring alternatives to Catholicism and imposing his new beliefs on his family. Randy easily persuaded Sharon to become an atheist, but was less successful in getting his entire family enthused about converting to Mormonism. Although not shy about explaining puberty to Stan, both Randy and Sharon are uncomfortable with the idea of having to talk with their son about sex and drugs. The relationship between the couple and their daughter Shelley has yet to receive significant attention on the show, although the episode "An Elephant Makes Love to a Pig" depicts them as taking Shelley's word over Stan's, at least at first.

Jimbo Kern had been portrayed as being both Randy's and Sharon's brother during the show's run, but an interview with series cocreator Matt Stone established him as being Randy's half-brother. However, according to 2020's "The Pandemic Special", Jimbo is indeed Sharon's brother. As is the case with Shelley, whatever relationship either might have with Jimbo has not been the subject of any of the show's subplots. A similar situation exists with Marvin Marsh, a 102-year-old who lives with Randy and Sharon. Though he shares the same family name as Randy, both Randy and Sharon have acknowledged Marvin as their own father. The episode "Spookyfish" briefly featured Aunt Flo, an elderly aunt of Sharon's who is the personification of a woman's period.

== In other media ==
Randy made a silent cameo appearance in the 2022 live-action/animated hybrid film Chip 'n Dale: Rescue Rangers.
