= Elon Musk filmography =

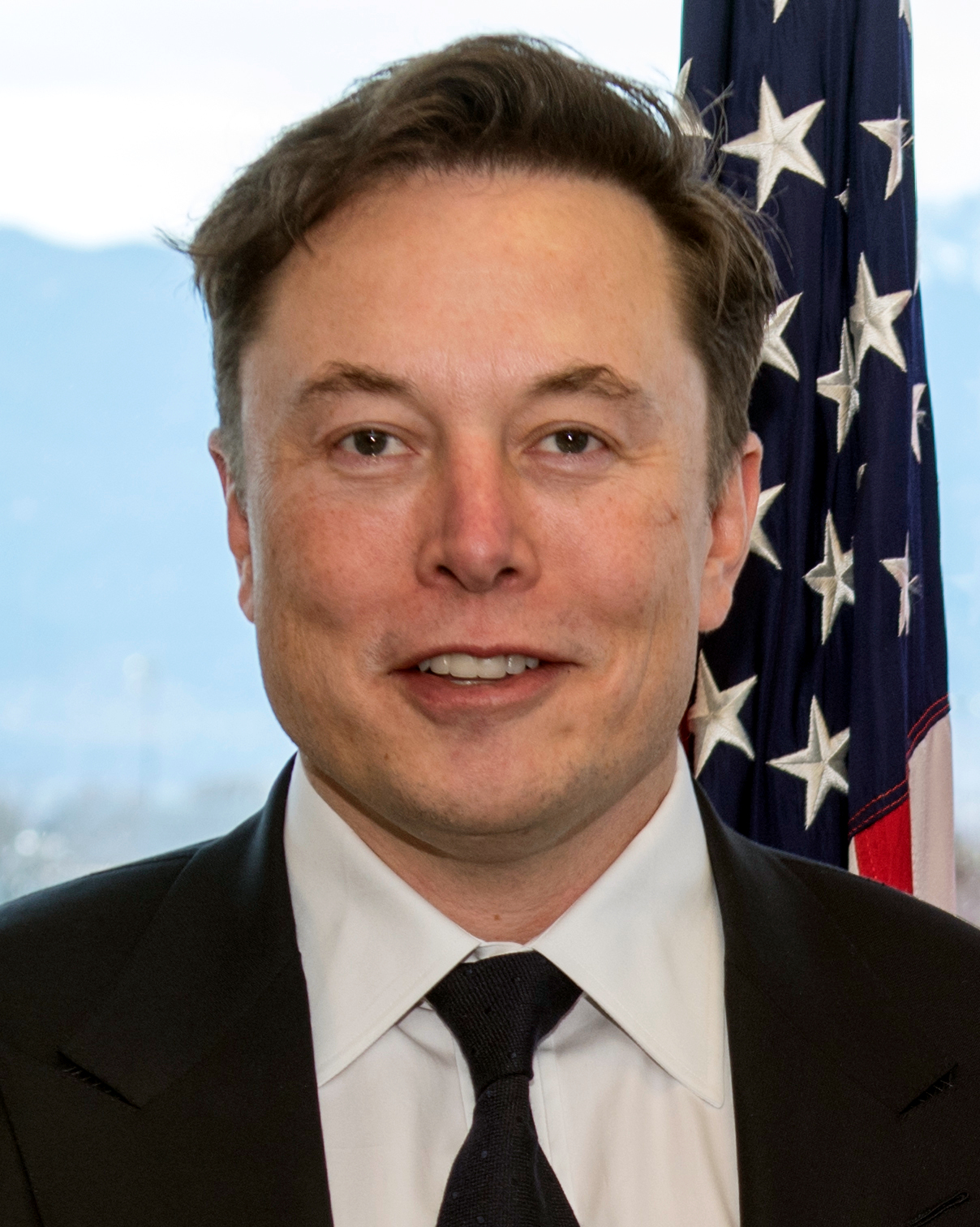
Musk in 2019

Elon Musk is a businessman who has made numerous cameo appearances in films and television shows as himself. These appearances include Iron Man 2, The Simpsons, South Park, The Big Bang Theory, Young Sheldon, and Rick and Morty. He has also made appearances in many documentary films.

== Films ==
List of films
Year	Title	Role(s)	Notes	Ref(s)
2005	Thank You for Smoking	Valet	Uncredited cameo; also executive producer	
2010	Iron Man 2	Himself	Cameo	
2010	Dumbstruck	—N/a	Executive producer	
2013	Machete Kills	Himself	Cameo	
2014	Transcendence	Himself	Cameo	
2016	Why Him?	Himself	Cameo	
2019	Men in Black: International	Himself	Uncredited cameo	

== Television ==
List of television series
Year	Title	Role	Notes	Ref(s)
2015	The Simpsons	Himself	Episode: "The Musk Who Fell to Earth"	
2015	The Big Bang Theory	Himself	Episode: "The Platonic Permutation"	
2016	South Park	Himself	Three episodes: "Members Only", "Not Funny", "The End of Serialization as We Know It"	
2016–2018	Mars	Himself	Six episodes	
2017	Young Sheldon	Himself	Episode: "A Patch, a Modem, and a Zantac"; cameo	
2019	Rick and Morty	Elon Tusk	Episode: "One Crew over the Crewcoo's Morty"; cameo	
2021	Saturday Night Live	Himself and various characters	Episode: "Elon Musk/Miley Cirus"	

== Documentaries ==
List of documentary films
Year	Title	Role	Ref(s)
2011	Revenge of the Electric Car	Himself	
2015	Racing Extinction	Himself	
2016	Lo and Behold	Himself	
2018	Do You Trust This Computer?	Himself	
2022	Return to Space	Himself	
2025	In Whose Name?	Himself	
2026	Musk (film)	Himself	
