= Douche and a Danish =

- South Park episode
- Episode no.: Season 20; Episode 5
- Directed by: Trey Parker
- Written by: Trey Parker
- Production code: 2005
- Original air date: October 19, 2016

Episode chronology
← Previous "Wieners Out"	Next → "Fort Collins"
- South Park season 20

"Douche and a Danish" is the fifth episode in the twentieth season of the American animated television series South Park. The 272nd episode of the series overall, it first aired on Comedy Central in the United States on October 19, 2016.

The episode lampooned controversies surrounding Donald Trump's comments towards women and accusations of sexual assault while continuing its parody of the 2016 United States presidential election and other topics.

== Plot ==
A fight between the girls and the boys is broken up by Cartman and Heidi Turner, which causes Annie Knitts to faint in shock. In Denmark, the people ask for donations to help build their website known as Troll Trace which will identify the real identities of Internet trolls, and Gerald Broflovski and a group of other trolls decide to act before the website comes online. Gerald suggests that the trolls work together as a group to troll the entire country of Denmark at once and get groups to turn against each other all at the same time. Cartman and Heidi ask the kids at South Park Elementary to do a fundraiser to help with Troll Trace and help unify the school by selling Danish pastries. The trolling against Denmark works, causing anti-Danish sentiment to rise and Denmark decides to leave social media completely, which also results in the fighting between the girls and the boys resuming. Cartman and Heidi send a VHS video to Denmark offering to help them find out who trolled them.

Meanwhile, Mr. Garrison resorts to using sexually explicit comments about women at his speeches in order to try to purposefully lose the election, which appears to work as women start to leave his speeches and his polling numbers plummet as a result. But when Garrison's supporters and campaign staff demand to know why he is making these statements, he answers that he knew all along that he would not win the election because the election is "fixed". His supporters riot, chasing him through the streets. He attempts to return to teaching at South Park Elementary as if nothing happened, but his campaign staff carries him out. Eventually he winds up at a member berry addiction meeting hosted by Randy Marsh who suggests that the berries are the cause behind people wanting to vote for Garrison, and that J. J. Abrams himself is somehow responsible.

== Reception ==
Jesse Schedeen with IGN rated the episode an 8.4 out of 10, especially enjoying how the series "has become razor-focused on continuity and slowly building its storylines from one week to the next." Jeremy Lambert with 411 Mania rated it a 6.7 out of 10, commenting that it was "Not a bad episode by any means, but it felt more like a set-up episode than anything else." Dan Caffrey from The A.V. Club gave it a B rating, feeling that "its satire slightly off-balance as it nails the Donald Trump of today, but offsets the portrayal with an outdated conspiracy theory from the recent past."
