= Oh, Jeez =

- South Park episode
- Episode no.: Season 20; Episode 7
- Directed by: Trey Parker
- Written by: Trey Parker
- Production code: 2007
- Original air date: November 9, 2016

Episode chronology
← Previous "Fort Collins"	Next → "Members Only"
- South Park season 20

"Oh, Jeez" is the seventh episode in the twentieth season of the American animated television series South Park. The 274th episode of the series overall, it first aired on Comedy Central in the United States on 9 November 2016. The episode lampooned the result of the 2016 United States presidential election the night before this episode was aired, in which Donald Trump defeated Hillary Clinton.

== Plot ==
The day after the 2016 United States presidential election, people are shocked that Mr. Garrison has defeated Hillary Clinton, especially Randy Marsh. In contrast to his earlier actions, Garrison in a dazed speech embraces his election. Randy visits Garrison and his running mate Caitlyn Jenner to confront their changed attitude and their changed belief that Star Wars: The Force Awakens was not a bad movie when Jenner suddenly vomits a member berry-based substance onto Randy, causing him to fall into the same dazed state of acceptance. Later at his home, Randy vomits on Sharon and Shelly, bringing them into the same state.

The city of Fort Collins, Colorado, has not had their election votes tallied as they are walled off due to the city's entire Internet histories being published from the Danish website known as Troll Trace. Government representatives arrive at Gerald and Sheila Broflovski's home and take Gerald away, who believes that this is a result of his trolling actions as Skankhunt42. He is led under a bridge where he meets with Hillary Clinton. Hillary and her agents task Gerald to become a spy and infiltrate Troll Trace headquarters in Denmark as an ambassador with a briefcase that would emit an electromagnetic pulse, destroying their computer equipment. When Gerald arrives in Denmark, he is warmly welcomed to the Troll Trace headquarters and taken to a room he believes is the server room only to be surprised by meeting his Internet troll friend Dildo Schwaggins and the rest of his trolling team. Schwaggins reveals that they were all set up by Hillary to be fake spies and purposefully given to the Danes in return for Denmark not activating the Troll Trace website. Their briefcases then simultaneously all open to reveal that they have been rickrolled.

Eric Cartman is scared that his girlfriend Heidi Turner will find out about his previous Internet history, so he asks Butters Stotch to help him cover up his previous Internet actions, but Butters is still mad at Cartman and the girls. Later, PC Principal hosts a school assembly with Bill Clinton who also brings along Bill Cosby to introduce a new gentlemen's club in hopes that the boys and girls of the school can get along. Bill Clinton has Stan Marsh and Wendy Testaburger try to make up but Butters interrupts their session by pressing his penis against the window. Bill Clinton later meets with Butters and reveals to him that this gentlemen's club is only an act to avoid the wrath of Hillary and the rest of the women when their Internet histories are revealed by Troll Trace. Eventually, Cartman takes Heidi to a SpaceX station with plans to escape to Mars and be completely isolated from the rest of the world.

== Production ==
A model sheet for Randy used in the episode's production.

"Oh, Jeez" was written and directed by series co-creator Trey Parker. The episode was originally going to be titled "The Very First Gentleman", referencing the idea that, if Hillary Clinton won the 2016 presidential election, her husband Bill Clinton would be the First Gentleman of the United States. This was done since each episode of South Park is conceived, storyboarded, and worked on just less than a week before airing, and the episode was slated to air the day after the results of the election.

However, the title and a large amount of the content was changed at the last minute to reflect the results of the election, where Donald Trump—who is parodied on the series through Mr. Garrison—won. Critics seemed to believe that Trey Parker and Matt Stone had originally written the episode with the premise of Hillary Clinton winning the election, which the pair later confirmed. The episode's production officially wrapped 9 hours prior to its premiere. The original broadcast of the episode also left the first uncensored usage of the word "fucking" in the series' history.

== Analysis ==
Through its short production time, author Megan R. Hill felt the episode was able to embody how shocking Trump's presidential victory was to the public; Hill also asserted that Randy's line, "We've learned that women can be anything, except for president" made for a "dark" yet "satiric" commentary from the series on Clinton losing. D.K. Johnson took the episode's swift approach at making Mr. Garrison president, and the use of online trolling to help get him there, as a commentary on the real-life effect that online trolls and "online anonymity" had on Trump's presidential victory.

== Reception ==
Many of the critical reviews focused on the changes the episode had to incorporate due to the election results. Jesse Schedeen from IGN rated the episode an 8.5 out of 10, noting "It'll be interesting to see how much Parker and Stone's reaction to the outcome of the election fuels these final three episodes." Jeremy Lambert with 411 Mania rated it a 7.8 out of 10, and summarized "South Park had their work cut out for them, but I thought they handled everything as you would expect South Park to handle these things." Dan Caffrey with The A.V. Club rated it a C− and thought "It just meanders, adding more cloak and daggers to the troll storyline as the show sluggishly moves to the end of its season."

== See also ==
- "Trapper Keeper", a South Park episode about the 2000 U.S. presidential election
- "Douche and Turd", a South Park episode about the 2004 U.S. presidential election
- "About Last Night...", a South Park episode about the 2008 U.S. presidential election
- "Obama Wins!", a South Park episode about the 2012 U.S. presidential election
