= Quintuplet (disambiguation) =

A quintuplet is one of five siblings from a multiple birth.

Quintuplet may also refer to:

- In music, a tuplet of five successive notes of equal duration
- The Quintuplet Cluster, a star cluster near the Galactic Center
- Quintuplets, an American sitcom
- "Quintuplets 2000", an episode of the American television series South Park
- The Quintessential Quintuplets, an anime series centered around five sisters
