= Trapper Keeper (South Park) =

- South Park episode
- Episode no.: Season 4 Episode 12
- Directed by: Trey Parker
- Written by: Trey Parker
- Production code: 413
- Original air date: November 15, 2000

Episode chronology
← Previous "Fourth Grade"	Next → "Helen Keller! The Musical"
- South Park season 4

"Trapper Keeper" is the twelfth episode of the fourth season of the animated television series South Park, and the 60th episode of the series overall. It is the 13th episode in production order of Season 4. It originally aired on Comedy Central in the United States on November 15, 2000. In the episode, a man from the future wants Cartman's new Trapper Keeper, while Mr. Garrison's kindergarten class holds an election for class president with confusing results. The Trapper Keeper storyline is an allusion to the Terminator films as well as the anime movie Akira. The subplot with the class president election is a parody of the 2000 United States presidential election and the controversy surrounding its outcome.

== Plot ==
While waiting for the school bus, Kyle shows his friends his new Dawson's Creek Trapper Keeper. He is joined by Cartman who reveals he has a special, advanced Dawson's Creek Trapper Keeper Ultra Keeper Futura S 2000, which has incredibly advanced computerized features including a television, a music player with voice recognition, OnStar and the ability to automatically hybridize itself to any electronic peripheral device. Kyle accuses Cartman of having purchased it to make him envious. On the bus, a mysterious white man calling himself "Bill Cosby" asks about Cartman's Trapper Keeper, which the man then attempts to steal. He succeeds by buying Cartman's trust, despite Cartman saying "I'm not supposed to have male friends over 30; I kinda got screwed over on that once." When "Bill Cosby" is caught by Officer Barbrady and Cartman, he explains his actions: the Trapper Keeper binder is destined to gain sentience and hybridize into a supercomputer to conquer the world in the future, and wipe out all traces of humanity. Cosby himself is a cyborg from the future named BSM-471, sent back in time to destroy the binder before it could rise to power; Cosby manages to destroy it, but Cartman buys another one and refuses to allow it to be destroyed.

Meanwhile, Mr. Garrison is back working at South Park Elementary, but has been demoted to teaching kindergarten, and his students holds an election for class president. Kyle's brother Ike has been admitted to kindergarten two years early because of his supposed intelligence (despite not being able to speak properly). Ike is chosen by Mr. Garrison to run against a boy named Filmore, resulting in a tie that is broken by the vote of a little girl named Flora. Flora is indecisive at first but eventually chooses Ike; Filmore's supporters demand recounts and then call in Rosie O'Donnell, his aunt, who protests the results. After Garrison angrily snaps at O'Donnell for her lack of consideration for those who voted for Ike, as well as venting his own political frustrations, an outraged O'Donnell leaves but vows to send "more lawyers, statesmen and press then you have ever seen" in her stead. After teams of lawyers get involved, filing masses of paperwork and holding protracted meetings, Filmore concedes the election because, according to him, "this game is stupid." With the dispute settled, the class decides to fingerpaint, much to Garrison's delight.

While this is happening, Stan, Kyle and Kenny accompany their robotic companion to Cartman's house to convince his mother to help them, but she goes off with Bill Cosby to have sex. Meanwhile, Cartman's Trapper Keeper integrates itself into Cartman's computer and most of his belongings, and then absorbs Cartman himself. Cartman is transformed into a giant, cybernetic blobby monster that retains most of Cartman's features, similar in style and execution to the movie Akira. It kills Kenny and destroys the house, and sets off to Cheyenne Mountain to absorb the secret military base's computer. Bill Cosby warns that if the Trapper Keeper assimilates with the supercomputer at Cheyenne Mountain, it will become unstoppable.

Kyle sneaks into the huge Cartman-Trapper Keeper hybrid through a ventilation pipe; but before he can disable it, the Trapper Keeper incapacitates him. O'Donnell appears in front of the Trapper Keeper and yells at it for blocking the road. The Trapper Keeper then absorbs her, but fusing with her ultimately makes the behemoth sick. Kyle is freed and disconnects the Trapper Keeper's CPU, causing it to lose power and release Cartman and a now deceased O'Donnell as it collapses. The destruction of the Trapper Keeper causes Bill Cosby to disappear, and Stan tells Cartman to thank Kyle, who just saved his life. Cartman starts to address Kyle, but gets no farther than saying his name before the end credits cut him off.

== Development ==
=== Background ===
The episode is a parody of the controversy surrounding the 2000 United States presidential election on November 7, 2000. State results tallied on election night gave 246 electoral votes to Republican candidate George W. Bush and 255 to Democratic nominee Al Gore, with New Mexico (5), Oregon (7), and Florida (25) too close to call that evening. Mathematically, Florida's 25 electoral votes became the key to an election win, while both New Mexico and Oregon were called in favor of Gore over the next few days. After an intense recount process, Bush was officially declared the winner of Florida's electoral votes and, as a result, the entire presidential election. There was disagreement over who won Florida's 25 electoral votes, the vote recount, and the uncommon situation in which the winner received fewer popular votes than the loser.

=== Production ===
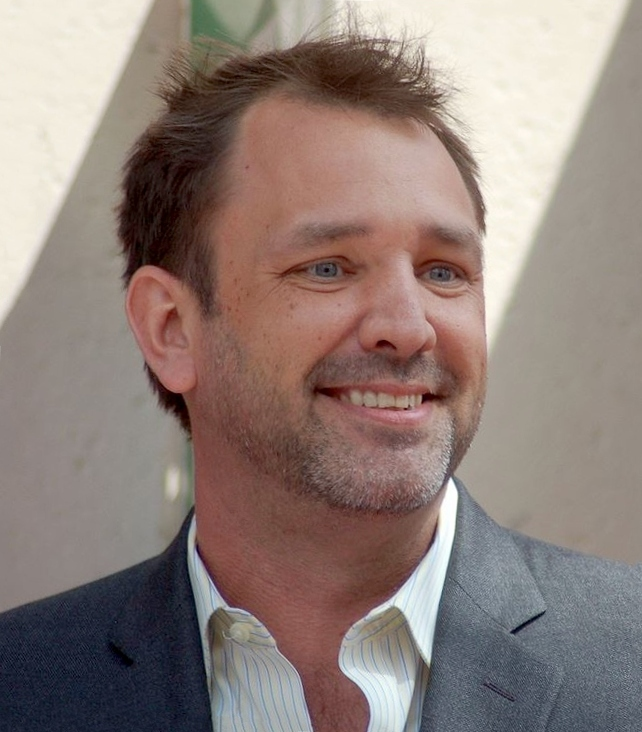
Trey Parker wrote the episode

"Trapper Keeper" was written by South Park co-creator Trey Parker when he, Matt Stone, and a group of friends visited Lake Powell. It is one of the many South Park episodes that parodies a current event. The main plot of the episode involving the Trapper Keeper was written before the election, but the subplot is a parody of the controversy surrounding the election's outcome. "Trapper Keeper" did not originally feature the election storyline, only a subplot about Ike attending his first day of kindergarten.

Parker and Stone said the presidential election controversy was "kids' stuff", and that is what they were trying to show with the episode. Stone commented that "it makes perfect sense because everything is just so childish anyway, the way people are acting about the election and the way candidates are. Usually you try to satirize something by taking it to the extreme. But it was actually kind of hard to satirize because it's just so stupid you can't even take it to an extreme". Anne Garefino, executive producer of South Park, said that when they applied the presidential election process to kindergarten, it "finally [made] sense". Stone added that the storyline "kind of wrote itself. When you put this same situation in with kindergartners, everyone's actions kind of make a lot more sense".

The voices of the kindergarteners were provided by actual children, including the son of one of the producers on the show. Parker and Stone said they had fun recording the kindergarten scenes, because "instead of adults doing the voices of the kids, it was so funny to hear a little kid actually doing it". The episode was completed at approximately nine in the morning on the day it aired, November 15, 2000, only days after the election was over. Parker and Stone worked with a team of 70 animators and computer engineers to get the episode finished in time.

== Cultural references ==
The main plot of "Trapper Keeper" is a parody of the Terminator films. The episode also features references to 2001: A Space Odyssey and Akira. The Trapper Keeper's ability to take on the physical forms of the various things it has consumed is a reference to the eponymous entity in the 1958 version of the movie The Blob.

The New York Post's Andrea Peyser analyzed the episode's references to the 2000 United States presidential election. She commented that in "Trapper Keeper", the election of class president ends in a deadlock, while in Florida, the election for president was "hopelessly deadlocked". She went on to say that Rosie O'Donnell appears in "Trapper Keeper" and plans to gather lawyers, media and her friends to "help settle the race the way she sees fit", while in Florida, O'Donnell, Harvey Weinstein, Gloria Steinem, Bianca Jagger, "and other celebrities signed a petition demanding a revote in Palm Beach County, ensuring the race would go to Gore". One of the kindergarteners is named Flora, referencing the state Florida that was undecided in the election.

== Reception ==
Alan Sepinwall and Matt Zoller Seitz of The Star-Ledger reviewed the episode as "terrific, especially the vote for kindergarten class president, and the recount-recount-recount bit". Sepinwall added that he was "pretty amazed myself that the South Park guys were able to put together such a sharp election satire so quickly. I called up Comedy Central and found out that they do all the animation in-house on computers that allow them to work much faster than shows like The Simpsons, which contract out all the animation to firms in Korea that take months to complete an episode." Bill Gibron of DVD Verdict described "Trapper Keeper" as "a clever attack on the entire Florida voting debacle in the 2000 election—the show's take on the entire childish nature of the fighting is fantastic. As a Terminator knock-off 'Trapper Keeper' is a lot of fun. But adding in the political element really increases the deliciously derogatory tone."

DVD Movie Guide's Colin Jacobson characterized "Trapper Keeper" as "a clever riff" on Terminator and the controversy of the 2000 election. He thought both plots "work really well, as the show tosses in lots of cool little moments. ... It's funny and smart, and a good [episode]." IGN's David Galindo called the episode "great," and Fort Worth Star-Telegram's Lisa Davis named Mr. Garrison's line "You're all acting like a bunch of kids!" the "best line of the week."

"Trapper Keeper" originally aired on Comedy Central in the United States on November 15, 2000. Though a rerun of the episode aired in the middle of the night on WPIX because of offensive content, a The Star-Ledger critic did not think it was "that dirty to begin with." The episode was included in the UMD South Park: When Technology Attacks that was released on October 11, 2005, for the PlayStation Portable. Other episodes included in the collection were "Best Friends Forever," "Cancelled," "Simpsons Already Did It," and "Towelie."

== See also ==
- "Douche and Turd", a South Park episode about the 2004 U.S. presidential election
- "About Last Night...", a South Park episode about the 2008 U.S. presidential election
- "Obama Wins!", a South Park episode about the 2012 U.S. presidential election
- "Oh, Jeez", a South Park episode about the 2016 U.S. presidential election
