= Members Only (South Park) =

- South Park episode
- Episode no.: Season 20; Episode 8
- Directed by: Trey Parker
- Written by: Trey Parker
- Production code: 2008
- Original air date: November 16, 2016

Guest appearance
- Elon Musk as himself

Episode chronology
| ← Previous "Oh, Jeez" | Next → "Not Funny" |
- South Park season 20

"Members Only" is the eighth episode in the twentieth season of the American animated television series South Park. The 275th episode of the series overall, it first aired on Comedy Central in the United States on November 16, 2016.

The episode, while mostly progressing the season's plot, lampooned Donald Trump's rejection of political correctness during his presidential campaign and parodied a worst-case scenario of a Trump-led presidency.

== Plot ==
The newly elected Mr. Garrison relishes his newfound authority by getting a Donald Trump-esque toupée and forcing PC Principal and other townspeople to perform fellatio on him as revenge for doubting him. However, as Denmark prepares to unleash their Troll Trace program worldwide, he is called to the Pentagon to manage the global crisis. Having absolutely no idea what to do, he angrily rebuffs a warning from Boris Johnson in London. Johnson warns Garrison that the country is collapsing after everybody ate the "mem'burries". Meanwhile, the member berries flood the White House, where their leader, an aged Godfather-like berry, plans to bring back "the real Stormtroopers".

Butters suddenly joins Cartman and Heidi Turner at the SpaceX building, hoping to leave Earth with them. Under the threat of Troll Trace, Butters has reversed his previous attitude toward women to the point where Heidi becomes interested in him, much to Cartman's annoyance. The three are disappointed to find that their desire to leave the planet was only taken metaphorically, as they are instead given a guided tour of the facility led by Elon Musk. After Musk explains that a Mars rocket is still several years away, he becomes interested in speeding up the process when offered Heidi's assistance.

Detained in the Troll Trace building in Denmark, Gerald Broflovski is given a cell phone by the Troll Trace CEO and is told he can call anybody to help him, although it will end up revealing his identity as Skankhunt42. Gerald calls Ike and instructs him to continue trolling as Skankhunt42, effectively framing Ike when Sheila catches him. When Kyle comes home and finds Ike sitting in the timeout corner, Kyle (remembering information told to him prior) suddenly realizes his father has been the troll all along. He grabs Ike and leaves the house, leaving Sheila bewildered.

== Reception ==
Jesse Schedeen with IGN rated the episode an 8.5 out of 10 and stated that he enjoyed how the episode "cleverly built on recent political events as it shed more light on the Member Berries and their true, horrifying plan for mankind." Jeremy Lambert with 411 Mania rated it a 6.5 out of 10 and noted "Something just feels a bit off from the start of the season to now." Dan Caffrey with The A.V. Club rated the episode an A−, and stated that the story "will definitely result in some great—if very, very dark—episodes of South Park in the future."
