= South Park season 20 =

Season of television series

South Park
- Season 20
- Home media release cover
- No. of episodes: 10

Release
- Original network: Comedy Central
- Original release: September 14 – December 7, 2016

Season chronology
- ← Previous; Season 19 Next → Season 21

The twentieth season of the American animated sitcom South Park premiered on Comedy Central on September 14, 2016, and ended on December 7, 2016, containing ten episodes. As with most seasons of the show, all episodes are written and directed by series co-creator and co-star Trey Parker.

Like the previous two seasons, this season features an episode-to-episode continuity, but unlike the previous two, the continuity is more linear, as if the whole season is one story arc. This season featured recurring themes focusing on Internet trolls, nostalgia, and the 2016 United States presidential election.

This season also had planned "dark weeks", weeks where no new episodes would air, which has been done since the 19th season. These were after episode three, episode six, and episode eight.

== Marketing ==
To promote the season, Comedy Central had mobile billboards placed in key locations in seven cities around the United States. Each billboard featured an image from the series that bore a connection to the location in which it was placed.

- In Los Angeles, a billboard was placed in front of the headquarters of the Church of Scientology, which was parodied in the controversial 2005 episode "Trapped in the Closet".
- In Washington, D.C., a billboard was placed in front of the Lincoln Memorial and the White House. It featured Barack and Michelle Obama, whose relationship was parodied in the 2008 episode "About Last Night..."
- In Lakewood, Colorado, a billboard was placed in front of the city's Casa Bonita restaurant, which was a central plot point of the 2003 episode "Casa Bonita".
- In Salt Lake City, Utah, a billboard was placed in front of the headquarters of the LDS Church, which was parodied in the 2003 episode "All About Mormons".
- In Menlo Park, California, a billboard was placed in front of the headquarters of Facebook, which was parodied in the 2010 episode "You Have 0 Friends".
- In New York City, a billboard was placed in front of the campaign headquarters of Donald Trump and Hillary Clinton, whose presidential campaigns were parodied in this season's premiere "Member Berries", and "Where My Country Gone?"
- In Buffalo, New York, a billboard was placed in front at the United States' border with Canada, whose culture and relationship with the United States has been parodied in the feature film South Park: Bigger, Longer & Uncut, and various episodes such as "Royal Pudding" and "Where My Country Gone?"

All of the billboards included the caption "We've Been There." In some of the locations, personnel of the organizations were displeased to have the billboards outside their locations and asked the billboard operators to leave, including the Los Angeles and both Washington, D.C., landmarks. Comedy Central's Chief Marketing Officer Walter Levitt stated, "That was all expected, and we completely understand why. We knew it was risky. We did this stunt because we thought it was a great way to remind South Park fans of all the amazing moments of the past 19 seasons and truly a perfect way to celebrate the 20th season."

== Episodes ==
| No. overall | No. in season | Title | Directed by | Written by | Original release date | Prod. code | U.S. viewers (millions) |
|---|---|---|---|---|---|---|---|
| 268 | 1 | "Member Berries" | Trey Parker | Trey Parker | September 14, 2016 | 2001 | 2.17 |
The national anthem is rebooted by J. J. Abrams. Mr. Garrison attempts to throw the 2016 presidential election against Hillary Clinton. Cartman is believed to be an Internet troll known as Skankhunt42 who attacks local girls on the school message board, but Gerald Broflovski is revealed to be the real troll.
| 269 | 2 | "Skank Hunt" | Trey Parker | Trey Parker | September 21, 2016 | 2002 | 1.58 |
Gerald begins to expand his trolling globally. The boys decide to take down Cartman, who they still believe is the troll. The girls plan to take action against the boys thanks to the damage Gerald has caused.
| 270 | 3 | "The Damned" | Trey Parker | Trey Parker | September 28, 2016 | 2003 | 1.79 |
Cartman and Heidi begin spending time with each other as they both are isolated from others with social media. Gerald faces consequences for his trolling and Mr. Garrison prepares for the presidential debate.
| 271 | 4 | "Wieners Out" | Trey Parker | Trey Parker | October 12, 2016 | 2004 | 1.82 |
Kyle attempts to bring the feud between the boys and girls to an end. Gerald feels the pressure of his trolling after his secret starts to be exposed.
| 272 | 5 | "Douche and a Danish" | Trey Parker | Trey Parker | October 19, 2016 | 2005 | 1.32 |
Gerald attempts to stop a troll locating website with the help of some other trolls. Garrison goes too far at one of his presidential rallies.
| 273 | 6 | "Fort Collins" | Trey Parker | Trey Parker | October 26, 2016 | 2006 | 1.41 |
Cartman fears that Heidi will discover his past. Randy and Mr. Garrison attempt to destroy member berries, and Gerald's troll team faces dire consequences.
| 274 | 7 | "Oh, Jeez" | Trey Parker | Trey Parker | November 9, 2016 | 2007 | 2.03 |
Mr. Garrison is elected President and the member berries are responsible. Gerald is sent to Denmark as a spy to eliminate Troll Trace but he is betrayed. Cartman asks Butters for help to prevent Heidi from finding out his secret.
| 275 | 8 | "Members Only" | Trey Parker | Trey Parker | November 16, 2016 | 2008 | 1.79 |
Mr. Garrison deals with the aftermath of being elected President. Gerald attempts to escape the wrath of being captured by Troll Trace, and Cartman and Heidi prepare to go to Mars together.
| 276 | 9 | "Not Funny" | Trey Parker | Trey Parker | November 30, 2016 | 2009 | 1.45 |
Butters tries to convince Cartman that Heidi might turn her back on him, while Kyle and Ike deal with their mother's frenzy after Gerald gets Ike framed for being the troll. Gerald discovers the Troll Trace leader's true intentions.
| 277 | 10 | "The End of Serialization as We Know It" | Trey Parker | Trey Parker | December 7, 2016 | 2010 | 1.82 |
Kyle and Ike team up and gather multiple groups to take down the Internet and Troll Trace. Cartman tries to stop the SpaceX program.

== Reception ==
The season received mixed reviews from critics and fans. Jesse Schedeen with IGN rated the entire season an 8.4 out of 10, noting "Season 20 proved that South Park has lost none of its edge over the years, as the show targeted everything from Donald Trump to the dangerous allure of nostalgia. Though the finale failed to properly tie everything together, South Park's ability to adapt and course-correct to real-world developments served it well this year."

== Home media ==
This season was released in its entirety on DVD and Blu-ray on June 13, 2017.

== See also ==
- South Park (Park County, Colorado)
- South Park City
