= The Damned (South Park) =

- South Park episode
- Episode no.: Season 20; Episode 3
- Directed by: Trey Parker
- Written by: Trey Parker
- Production code: 2003
- Original air date: September 28, 2016

Episode chronology
← Previous "Skank Hunt"	Next → "Wieners Out"
- South Park season 20

"The Damned" is the third episode in the twentieth season of the American animated television series South Park. The 270th episode of the series overall, it originally aired on Comedy Central in the United States on September 28, 2016.

The episode, while mostly progressing the plot and themes of the previous two episodes, also lampooned the first presidential debate between Hillary Clinton and Donald Trump.

== Plot ==
Danish Olympic gold medalist Freja Ollegard is on a talk show discussing the online bullying she is receiving from Skankhunt42 for the website she created for breast cancer survivors. The talk show host reads social media comments that initially appear to be sincere, but are revealed to be from double entendre pseudonyms of Skankhunt42 (a.k.a. Gerald Broflovski) while he watches the show. The next morning, Gerald is visited by two policemen who question him on Cartman's sudden disappearance from Twitter without explanation. They then question Gerald's son, Kyle, who also denies any knowledge. Gerald continues sending hateful messages to Freja, but this results in her suicide, sending Gerald into a panic. At a funeral service for Freja, the speaker announces that Denmark will go to war with the troll, and that the Danish people have known for centuries that to get a troll to come out of hiding, one must say his name. Meanwhile, at the supermarket, Gerald finds an anonymous note attached to his car windshield that reads "I know who you are." Gerald clears his history on all of his devices and destroys them. He then realizes that Ike's computer may also leave a trail to his activity, but while attempting to clean it, he receives an anonymous email repeating the message, "I know who you are," followed by an alert asking him to meet with the anonymous sender the next day.

Meanwhile, Randy Marsh supports Hillary Clinton, referred to as the Turd Sandwich, for President, and expresses disdain to the people of South Park that are supporting the Giant Douche, a.k.a. Mr. Garrison. Even though Garrison admits to being an incompetent presidential candidate during a debate and other speeches, his apparent honesty only results in increased support from his constituents, even leading to Randy finding him appealing to the point that he changes his mind. When he reveals this to Stephen Stotch, Stephen reveals that he has also changed his mind and now wants to vote for Clinton. Their mutual flip-flopping on candidates gives Randy cause for suspicion. After being offered a pie filled with member berries by Stephen, Randy goes to visit the Old Farmer whose crop is being dwarfed by hundreds and hundreds of member berry bushes.

Cartman and Heidi Turner, who are both apparently 'dead to the world' for having left Twitter, begin to converse with each other to compensate for the lack of a social media presence, and begin spending time in the park with others who have quit Twitter. Cartman explains to Heidi that his attempt to prove that women are funny at a school assembly was sincere and that he is genuinely trying to change himself. During one of their private conversations, Cartman asks Heidi if girls have testicles, and she replies they do not. Cartman explains he does not know what is at the bottom of a vagina to scratch when girls get itchy. Much to his surprise, Heidi offers to show Cartman.

== Reception ==
Jesse Schedeen from IGN gave "The Damned" a 7.4 out of 10, commenting that "This week's episode tackled a huge amount of material, but to generally better results than the overstuffed premiere episode." Jeremy Lambert with 411 Mania gave the episode a 7.5 out of 10, complimenting the focus of the episode and how it set up for the future, stating "While I think the laughs have gotten lighter, the storytelling has never been better". Dan Caffrey with The A.V. Club rated the episode a B−, stating that he is not a fan of the episodic story so far this season, stating "Sometimes, there’s so much plot to get out of the way, that an episode might come up short on the jokes."
