= Fort Collins (disambiguation) =

Fort Collins is a city in the U.S. state of Colorado.

Fort Collins may also refer to:

- "Fort Collins" (song), a 2015 song by Hopsin
- "Fort Collins" (South Park), an episode of the television series South Park
