= Wieners Out =

- South Park episode
- Episode no.: Season 20; Episode 4
- Directed by: Trey Parker
- Written by: Trey Parker
- Production code: 2004
- Original air date: October 12, 2016

Episode chronology
← Previous "The Damned"	Next → "Douche and a Danish"
- South Park season 20

"Wieners Out" is the fourth episode in the twentieth season of the American animated television series South Park. The 271st episode of the series overall, it first aired on Comedy Central in the United States on October 12, 2016.

The episode lampooned modern social protest movements and campaigns (like Free the Nipple and Black Lives Matter) and commented on Internet anonymity, while also progressing the plot and themes of the season's previous episodes. This was the first episode since the third season to be rated 18 in the UK for its DVD release, due to the scene involving Sheila urinating on Gerald.

== Plot ==
A Danish narrator explains the Danish history of dealing with trolls and that now they are on a quest to take out the newest variety, the Internet troll. Gerald Broflovski feels the pressure of being found out for his trolling as Skankhunt42, and he tries as much as he can to cover it up. Meanwhile, Kyle feels guilt over the rift between the boys and the girls. When he tries to bring them together, it only strains their relationships further, and Butters takes on a leadership role after the elementary school girls convince his long-distance girlfriend Charlotte to dump him online. During the national anthem, he takes down his pants, exposing his penis, in protest of feeling shamed for his gender, at a girls' volleyball game. Most of the boys immediately follow suit, disgusting the girls even more. Gerald struggles with his trolling withdrawal, eventually meeting with a fellow troll known as Dildo Schwaggins under a bridge, who warns Gerald of an upcoming attack from the Danes. Gerald eventually succumbs to the pressure and Sheila catches him in the bathroom while trolling on an iPad that Sheila bought for him. Still reluctant to reveal his inner troll self, Gerald lies to Sheila, saying that he was watching "piss porn", and he agrees to be urinated on to cover up his secret. He even attends an addiction meeting, but it turns out to be for member berry addicts instead.

Meanwhile at school, Kyle apologizes to Cartman on behalf of the others boys for not believing him and destroying his electronics. He meets up with him at a diner where he ends up meeting his girlfriend Heidi Turner. Kyle realizes that he will not be able to stop Butters, who is now leading protest marches without pants, from worsening the rift on his own, so he attempts to get Cartman on his side. Cartman refuses since he feels that he is happier with Heidi, away from the divisiveness of groups and social media. Schwaggins shows Gerald a video by the BBC News that explains a Danish website known as Troll Trace designed to track down the real-life identity of Internet trolls is coming online. The founder of the site threatens to expose trolls everywhere, although he is aware that his methods will have the greater effect of stripping anonymity from anyone posting on the Internet. Schwaggins and Gerald retreat to a group of other trolls. Kyle meets up with the boys and girls at the school cafeteria, where he announces that he now agrees to Butters' protest. As he pulls out his penis in front of them, most of the girls leave in disgust, and the boys cheer and carry him out on their shoulders.

== Reception ==
Jesse Schedeen from IGN rated the episode an 8.4 out of 10, and commented that he loved the "more focused episode this week as the series continues to lampoon social media." Jeremy Lambert with 411 Mania gave it a 7.5 out of 10, summarizing his review with the comment "There's no denying the brilliance of South Park when they are focused on a story." Dan Caffrey from The A.V. Club rated the episode an A− and found the scene with Sheila urinating on Gerald while Ike and Kyle watch from the doorway "the kind of nasty sight gag that's become a staple of the South Park universe." Chris Longo with Den of Geek rated it 3.5 out of 5 stars, still continuing his theory that this season "is still Eric Cartman's South Park, one we've been building up to for decades."
