= Woodland Critter Christmas =

- South Park episode
- Episode no.: Season 8 Episode 14
- Directed by: Trey Parker
- Written by: Trey Parker
- Production code: 814
- Original air date: December 15, 2004

Guest appearances
- Dante Alexander, Dakota Sky and Spencer Lacey Ganus as the mountain lion cubs

Episode chronology
| ← Previous "Cartman's Incredible Gift" | Next → "Mr. Garrison's Fancy New Vagina" |
- South Park season 8

"Woodland Critter Christmas" is the fourteenth and the final episode of season eight of the American animated television series South Park. The 125th episode overall, it originally aired on Comedy Central in the United States on December 15, 2004.

== Plot ==
Like many routine Christmas specials, this episode has a rhyming narration akin to a storybook. It begins in a forest, where Stan Marsh discovers a group of talking animals, known as the Woodland Critters, consisting of Squirrely the Squirrel, Rabbity the Rabbit, Raccoony the Raccoon, Beavery the Beaver, Beary the Bear, Porcupiney the Porcupine, Skunky the Skunk, Foxy the Fox, Deery the Deer, Woodpeckery the Woodpecker, Mousey the Mouse, and Chickadee-y the Chickadee, who are all building a Christmas tree. They convince a surprised but apathetic Stan to help make a star for it, after which he goes home. That night, they wake him in his room and explain that Porcupiney is pregnant with the creatures' savior. Though tired and annoyed, Stan agrees to help them build a manger for the baby. As he finishes, however, another problem appears: a mountain lion, which eats every pregnant Critter to prevent their Savior's birth. Exasperated, Stan goes to the cave where the mountain lion lives and manages to kill it, but is dismayed to learn that the mountain lion is the mother of three now-orphaned cubs. He is further horrified to learn that the Woodland Critters are Satanists and that their "Savior" is the Antichrist. They celebrate Stan's victory by sacrificing Rabbity, devouring his flesh, and having an orgy in his blood.

Stan tries to ignore the impending apocalypse, only to be goaded by the narrator into trying to stop it. Unfortunately, the Critters can rebuff him with their Satanic powers, which will grow more vital as the Antichrist's birth approaches. Since the Critters claim that only a mountain lion can prevent that, Stan, heeding the narrator's instructions, returns to the mountain to enlist the orphaned cubs. Since they are too small to take on the Critters, they can only stop the birth by learning how to perform an abortion. The narrator forces Stan to take them to an abortion clinic for lessons, despite his objections. Meanwhile, the Critters are searching for an unbaptized human host for the Antichrist to possess once it is born. They discover Kyle Broflovski, who reveals to the Critters that he does not celebrate Christmas because he is Jewish, and lure him into the forest.

Stan and the cubs return to the forest, only to discover that the Antichrist, a hairless, jabbering little creature, has already been born, with Kyle tied to a Satanic altar. When he learns what is happening, Santa Claus arrives, pulls out a shotgun, and kills all the Critters. Stan explains that the Antichrist will die without a human host to inhabit, but Kyle, having been freed, suddenly decides to allow the Antichrist to possess him. He declares that he will conquer the world in the name of the Jews, allowing them to finally take control of Christmas once and for all.

The scene suddenly cuts to Mr. Garrison's fourth-grade class, revealing that the narration had been from a Christmas-themed story narrated by Eric Cartman for a school assignment. Kyle objects to its blatant antisemitism, and Mr. Garrison, fearing complaints from Kyle's mother Sheila, forces Cartman to stop reading. However, the rest of the class, including Stan, wants to hear how the story ends and plead with Kyle to let Cartman finish. Kyle objects that the ending is obvious, as he assumes Santa Claus will simply kill him, thus saving Christmas. Cartman insists that the ending is different, and Kyle reluctantly allows Cartman to continue.

In the story, Kyle becomes horrified at how evil the Antichrist feels and begs the others to exorcise it before it takes control of him. Santa believes it is too late and is about to kill Kyle, but Stan has the mountain lion cubs perform an abortion through Kyle's anus, allowing Santa to smash the Antichrist with a sledgehammer, killing it. Santa gives Stan a special Christmas wish, which he uses to resurrect the mother mountain lion, who is happily reunited with her cubs. Everyone then goes home to a happy Christmas. The narrator concludes, "and they all lived happily ever after... except for Kyle, who died of AIDS two weeks later," with an image of an AIDS-stricken Kyle dying in a hospital bed. The episode concludes with "The End," while Kyle can be heard angrily shouting "Goddamn it, Cartman!"

== Production ==
According to Trey Parker and Matt Stone on the DVD commentary, this episode was one of the most difficult to make. After making the 13 other episodes from the eighth season of South Park and the movie Team America: World Police all in 2004, a year which Parker and Stone describe as "The Year from Hell", the two men and the writing staff were completely drained of ideas. They tried to come up with an idea, but nothing came up through Thursday and Friday, which was considered a huge setback due to the show's rushed production schedule. So troubled was the production that Parker considered calling Comedy Central to inform them that they would not have an episode to air on the forthcoming Wednesday. On Saturday morning, they decided to just do the idea of parodying John Denver and the Muppets: A Christmas Together holiday special, which had been in gestation for some time. Parker was initially against doing another Christmas episode, as he felt the material was not good enough to match the success of the show's previous Christmas-themed episodes. With the Wednesday deadline looming, Parker had no choice but to follow through with the idea. Later that afternoon, the writers had a breakthrough with the idea of depicting the Critters as Satanic worshippers, as well as satirizing the blood orgy scene from the 1997 movie Event Horizon. By Sunday, the episode developed into a storyline featuring a rhyming narration in the style of How the Grinch Stole Christmas, and ending with the twist reveal of being a story told by Cartman to his classmates. Parker recalled how, while driving home later that evening, he spontaneously "roared like a lion" upon the realization that not only would there be an episode completed in time, but one satisfactory enough to end the season on a high note.

== Home media ==
"Woodland Critter Christmas", along with the thirteen other episodes from South Park's 8th season, were released on a three-disc DVD set in the United States on August 29, 2006. The sets included brief audio commentaries by Parker and Stone for each episode. IGN gave the season a 9/10.

On November 13, 2007, the episode was released on the compilation DVD Christmas Time In South Park. The episode is also included as a bonus on the DVD for the standalone film Imaginationland: The Movie.
