= The Jeffersons (South Park) =

- South Park episode
- Episode no.: Season 8 Episode 6
- Directed by: Trey Parker
- Written by: Trey Parker
- Production code: 807
- Original air date: April 21, 2004

Guest appearance
- Dante Alexander as Blanket Jackson

Episode chronology
← Previous "Awesom-O"	Next → "Goobacks"
- South Park season 8

"The Jeffersons" is the sixth episode in the eighth season of the American animated television series South Park. The 117th episode of the series overall, it was originally broadcast on Comedy Central in the United States on April 21, 2004. It is seventh in production order of season eight.

In the episode, Michael Jackson, under the fake name of Michael Jefferson, moves to South Park to escape his popularity.

== Plot ==
Stan, Kyle, Cartman and Kenny notice that someone new has moved into the Donovans' former residence, before a young boy named Blanket greets them and informs the group that the family moved to South Park to escape the city life. They find the house is filled with toys and games, and the backyard is a funfair. They meet Blanket's father, Mr. Jefferson, an eccentric man-child who is obviously Michael Jackson wearing a fake mustache, though everyone remains oblivious. Stan mistakes Mr. Jefferson as a burn victim due to his unusual appearance and suspects this may be the reason for his vast wealth, meanwhile Kyle notices that he is neglecting Blanket.

Stan tells his parents about the Jeffersons and Sharon invites Mr Jefferson over to a dinner party. The adults try to talk with Mr. Jefferson at the dinner, but he is shy around the adults, and responds sheepishly when asked about the political issues being discussed. Cartman, meanwhile, has become jealous that Mr. Jefferson has been invited to Stan's house believing Stan is attempting to "steal" his best friend. That night at Stan's house, Stan is awoken by Mr. Jefferson dressed as Peter Pan, who claims he wants to play. Cartman then re-enters the home through the window to prevent Stan from having Mr. Jefferson all to himself. Kyle shows up at the door with Blanket, who he found alone in his backyard. Mr. Jefferson suggests a sleepover between the boys, as he and Blanket are unable to return home due to a ghost occupying their house.

The next morning, Stan's parents walk in to see Mr. Jefferson in Stan's bed and scold Mr. Jefferson about his odd, inappropriate behavior. Mr. Jefferson explains that his behavior is from not having a childhood, and gives Randy and Sharon $100 each to drop the matter, which dissolves the issue. Though Randy is satisfied, Sharon forbids the boys to see Mr. Jefferson after he and Blanket leave, to which the boys (barring Cartman) agree.

At the Park County Police Station, Harrison Yates gets a report about the Jeffersons claiming that they are wealthy and black, thus the whole department sets off to frame him for a crime as they express their disdain for African Americans wealthier than them. They plant cocaine, pubic hair, and blood in Mr. Jefferson's home and wait for him to arrive. When the officers see Mr. Jefferson and his son, they abort the operation as Jefferson appears white. Yates returns home planning on retiring the force also mentioning that O. J. Simpson’s charges were dropped because someone said the N-word too many times, but his wife encourages him that "framing wealthy black people is in his blood". He agrees, and calls the police department in Santa Barbara, Mr. Jefferson's former place of residence. They alert him that they framed a rich black man charged of molestation who did not look black, and he ran away before trial.

Mr. Jefferson refuses to let Blanket outside anymore because he thinks everyone is against them. Stan and Kyle horrifyingly fear for the safety of Blanket after seeing Mr. Jefferson dangle him from the balcony of his house. They decide to rescue Blanket by sneaking into his room at night and switching him with Kenny, disguised as the child. Mr. Jefferson calls his plastic surgeon in California to see if he can put his face back together, which is falling apart from years of plastic surgery, but he refuses. Stan and Kyle try to smuggle Blanket out of the house but are confronted by a horribly disfigured Mr. Jefferson, who wants them to play, and they escape to Blanket's room. Upon seeing Kenny dressed like Blanket, Mr. Jefferson is fooled and playfully throws Kenny into the ceiling, thus killing him. Jefferson proceeds to chase the other three outside where the police are waiting to arrest him for the molestation charges put in Santa Barbara.

A crowd gathers around, but Cartman defends Mr. Jefferson, saying he never had a proper childhood, which was why he associated more with children. Kyle counters that even if all of the accusations about Mr. Jefferson are false and the police really do go around framing rich black men, that he has to grow up because he has a child of his own now. Mr. Jefferson realizes that Kyle is right, so he decides to be more of a father to Blanket and give away their wealth to the needy. This no longer gives a reason for the police to arrest him; Yates tells Mr. Jefferson that there was "no point in putting another poor black man in jail".

== Reception ==
Maxim states Mr. Jefferson is "a Michael-Jackson-like freak", and National Board of Review's John Gallagher calls this episode "a howlingly-funny assault on Michael Jackson" in his review of the DVD. The A.V. Club would later call it "one of [the] best [Harrison] Yates episodes ever".
