= Skank Hunt =

- South Park episode
- Episode no.: Season 20; Episode 2
- Directed by: Trey Parker
- Written by: Trey Parker
- Production code: 2002
- Original air date: September 21, 2016

Episode chronology
← Previous "Member Berries"	Next → "The Damned"
- South Park season 20

"Skank Hunt" is the second episode in the twentieth season of the American animated television series South Park. The 269th episode of the series overall, it first aired on Comedy Central in the United States on September 21, 2016. The episode satirizes trolling, cyberbullying and suicide prevention.

== Plot ==
The faculty at South Park Elementary holds a parents-only meeting, discussing the recent activity of an Internet troll named Skankhunt42 who harasses people on the school's student message boards and elsewhere on the Internet. The parents are implored to investigate the question of whether if one of their children might be the troll, unaware that Skankhunt42 is actually Gerald Broflovski, the father to students Kyle and Ike Broflovski.

Student Heidi Turner becomes depressed and deletes her Twitter profile, throwing her phone off a bridge. The entire school is devastated, and treat the situation as if Heidi killed herself. The classmates and Mr. Mackey have a "funeral" during which they pay tribute to her on Twitter, despite her presence among them. Later, Scott Malkinson is convinced to "end it all" by deleting his Twitter account. Mr. Mackey is forced to calm him down, only to have Scott come to him minutes later complaining about the same thing. This recurs to the point where Scott calls Mr. Mackey in the middle of the night.

Gerald gleefully continues his clandestine Internet activities. Although a colleague of one of Gerald's victims characterizes Skankhunt42 as miserable, Gerald is shown genuinely enjoying his day, dancing in the street, exhibiting extreme tolerance to bad behavior on the part of others. He soon discovers that his Internet attacks have made the news. Following his attack upon a Danish breast cancer awareness website, its webmaster, a Danish Olympic volleyball gold medalist named Freja Ollegard, states publicly that she will not be intimidated by Skankhunt42. Gerald sees this as a challenge that he happily accepts.

Convinced that Skankhunt42 is one of the boys, the female students conspire to take revenge against him. The boys hold a meeting in which they decide to fix the problem, which they think is Eric Cartman. They lure him to a cabin in the woods, with the promise of a slumber party of all-night video game-playing. At the cabin, the boys brandish assorted weapons, with which they destroy Cartman's electronic devices and bury them.

As Skankhunt42's activities continue, the boys are shocked to realize that it cannot be Cartman. Unaware of this, each of the girls confronts her respective boyfriend, handing him a letter stating that she is breaking up with him forever in a reference to the ancient Greek comedy Lysistrata. As Stan observes this throughout the school, Wendy hands him her note before walking away.

== Reception ==
Jesse Schedeen from IGN gave the episode an 8.3 out of 10, noting it as a "much more focused and enjoyable episode than last week's scatter-brained season premiere." Jeremy Lambert from 411 Mania gave it a 5.5 out of 10, criticizing it because it "couldn't seem to make up its mind" between being a serious episode about Internet trolling and suicide, or a lighthearted approach to trolling. Dan Caffrey of The A.V. Club gave it an A− while complimenting the implementation of Boston while Gerald enthusiastically trolls the Internet. Chris Longo with Den of Geek gave it 3 out of 5 stars while theorizing that Cartman is still reaping the benefits of this storyline, commenting that "he's one step closer to winning his ideological war, even if he's no longer the person pulling the strings."
