= Obama Wins! =

- South Park episode
- Episode no.: Season 16; Episode 14
- Directed by: Trey Parker
- Written by: Trey Parker
- Production code: 1614
- Original air date: November 7, 2012

Episode chronology
← Previous "A Scause for Applause"	Next → "Let Go, Let Gov"
- South Park season 16

"Obama Wins!" is the fourteenth and final episode of the sixteenth season of the American animated sitcom South Park, and the 237th episode of the series overall. It premiered on Comedy Central in the United States on November 7, 2012. The episode centers upon a secret that Eric Cartman is harboring that may alter the outcome of the 2012 U.S. presidential election, and also references the erstwhile recent sale of Lucasfilm to The Walt Disney Company, and the narration work of Morgan Freeman, a parodied version of whom appears in the story.

== Plot ==
During the 2012 U.S. presidential election, Eric Cartman masquerades as an unassuming child in order to deceive elderly poll workers, and steal ballots from polling stations in various swing states: Colorado, North Carolina, Florida, Ohio, and Nevada. The day after the election, in which Barack Obama has been reelected as President of the United States, Cartman shows Kyle Broflovski the stolen ballots. An outraged Kyle reports the theft to the police, but by the time the police search his bedroom, Cartman has hidden the ballots at Stevenson's Hummer, a dealership outside of town. It is revealed that Cartman was hired by General Pun Lee Tsao, working on behalf of the Chinese government, who secured a re-election for Obama as part of a deal with the incumbent president. When one of Obama's aides points out the danger of Tsao going to the press, Obama dismisses this possibility, saying that everyone knows General Tsao's "chicken", a play on the dish General Tso's chicken that recurs throughout the episode.

Tsao, Cartman and Obama meet at a Red Lobster, where they are confronted by Kyle, Stan Marsh, Kenny McCormick and their friends, who learn, via explanation by Morgan Freeman, that in exchange for Obama's re-election, the Chinese want Obama to give them the rights to the Star Wars franchise (which George Lucas had recently sold to The Walt Disney Company), so that the Chinese can make future Star Wars sequels. Freeman further explains that Cartman will not reveal the location of the ballots until his new demands are met. When Stan asks Freeman why he always shows up to explain something convoluted, Freeman responds that every time he does so, he gets a new freckle. Cartman demands of the Chinese that he be allowed to play Luke Skywalker's son in the future Star Wars sequels, but when Tsao angrily refuses, on the grounds that this was not a part of their original deal, Cartman flees the meeting.

As Kyle, Stan, Kenny and the other boys search Cartman's house for the missing ballots, Mickey Mouse arrives in South Park in Slave I, having learned of the deal with the Chinese. He kidnaps Cartman, who understands that Mickey only cares about the election results because Mitt Romney would have taken a more hardline stance with the Chinese. In exchange for making the ballots public, Mickey agrees to Cartman's demands, which in addition to playing Luke Skywalker's son, now include a Tauntaun, a Star Wars blaster pistol and the creation of a character for the films named Jewbacca. By the time the police, Tsao, Kyle, Stan and Cartman converge upon Stevenson's Hummer, Morgan Freeman again appears, explaining that the Chinese want the Star Wars franchise in order to protect it from Disney, which they fear may not be the right studio for that franchise. Gaining more freckles, Freeman asks what is more important: that the right man is elected president, or that Star Wars is with the people who will protect it best. The police decide not to report their discovery of the ballots, and Cartman watches in horror as Stan burns the ballots, thus destroying Cartman's chances of being part of the Star Wars franchise. All those present join hands and chant, while an image of Obama appears in the smoke.

== Critical reception ==
"Obama Wins!" received positive reviews. Marcus Gilmer of The A.V. Club gave the episode a grade of "A", stating that he has long-enjoyed the series' treatment of politics, and opining that "Obama Wins!" was an "inspired...glorious, rollicking episode" that surpassed the quality of "Raising the Bar", "A Nightmare on Face Time" and "A Scause for Applause". Max Nicholson of IGN gave the episode a 9.3/10 "Amazing" rating, saying "South Park's Season 16 finale finished strong thanks to a wealth of Star Wars references and sharp political satire."

== See also ==
- "Trapper Keeper", a South Park episode about the 2000 U.S. presidential election
- "Douche and Turd", a South Park episode about the 2004 U.S. presidential election
- "About Last Night...", a South Park episode about the 2008 U.S. presidential election
- "Oh, Jeez", a South Park episode about the 2016 U.S. presidential election
