= Quest for Ratings =

- South Park episode
- Episode no.: Season 8 Episode 11
- Directed by: Trey Parker
- Written by: Trey Parker
- Production code: 811
- Original air date: November 17, 2004

Episode chronology
| ← Previous "Preschool" | Next → "Stupid Spoiled Whore Video Playset" |
- South Park season 8

"Quest for Ratings" is the eleventh episode in the eighth season of the American animated television series South Park. The 122nd episode of the series overall, it originally aired on Comedy Central in the United States on November 17, 2004.

In the episode, the boys produce their own morning news show on the school's closed-circuit television station and are immediately caught up in an intense competition for ratings.

== Plot ==
Stan, Cartman, Kyle, Butters, Jimmy and Token are taping "Super School News", a newscast airing on South Park Elementary's closed-circuit television system. Cartman and Jimmy play the leading roles as head anchors, Butters is the entertainment and celebrity reporter, Stan is a field reporter, Token is the meteorologist, and Kyle does sports. However, after their news program airs, their teacher Mr. Meryl tells them that they did horribly in the ratings, trailing far behind Craig's home video show, "Animals Close-Up With a Wide-Angle Lens", which they consider pointless and banal. (The footage is accompanied by the tune "Yakety Sax".)

The news team then pledges to make a program that will be a ratings booster and gain the attention of all students. They rename the show "Sexy Action School News" and add flashy elements (in a parody of various infotainment shows), including random "Panda Madness Minutes" in which the newscasters spontaneously dance with pandas. However, nothing seems to work; although they beat Craig's original series, they fall far behind his new show, "Animals Close-Up With a Wide-Angle Lens Wearing Hats".

To get ideas, the boys decide to get high on cough medicine. They begin to experience weird hallucinations and start wandering through South Park behaving strangely. They eventually retire to their ideas room, and watch Craig's show with stoned expressions, and find it awesome.

When they come around, their notepads contain nothing useful. Then Stan realizes that the video they were watching all night while under the influence of cough medicine—and concluded was the "greatest show ever"—was Craig's show. They realize that Craig's show gets such good ratings because most of the school must be high on cough medicine. They then decide to produce a special report that gets cough medicine banned from school.

Soon after, the ratings drop and Craig's show is cancelled, as the children are no longer high and therefore no longer enjoy the show. To emphasize the importance of good ratings, the AV teacher then suspends Craig from school and requests the removal of his testicles. Satisfied with their results, the "Sexy Action School News" team discovers the curse of a successful show: each subsequent episode has to be just as good. Back in the writer's room, they come up with nothing and eventually decide to just "bail".

== Production ==
With the 2006 DVD release of the eighth season, many of the audio commentaries revealed that much of the lack of ideas was because Team America: World Police, Trey Parker and Matt Stone's concurrent film, had just been through a long, grueling post-production which left the staff low on energy:

So, this episode marks a very special time in South Park history, because, this was the first time that we were officially... out of ideas.

— Trey Parker on the DVD commentary for this episode

== Home media ==
"Quest for Ratings", along with the thirteen other episodes from South Park's eighth season, was released on a three-disc DVD set in the United States on August 29, 2006. The set includes brief audio commentaries by Parker and Stone for each episode.
