= Douche and Turd =

- South Park episode
- Episode no.: Season 8 Episode 8
- Directed by: Trey Parker
- Written by: Trey Parker
- Production code: 808
- Original air date: October 27, 2004

Episode chronology
← Previous "Goobacks"	Next → "Something Wall-Mart This Way Comes"
- South Park season 8

"Douche and Turd" is the eighth episode of the eighth season of the animated television series South Park, and the 119th episode overall. Written by series co-creator Trey Parker, it first aired on Comedy Central in the United States on October 27, 2004, the week before the 2004 U.S. presidential election, which the episode satirizes.

The episode follows South Park Elementary holding an election to determine the new mascot for the school. The two candidates—a Giant Douche and a Turd Sandwich―are respectively suggested by Kyle and Cartman, and each purports that their nominee is superior to the other. Stan, who sees the election as pointless, refuses to vote and is consequently exiled from South Park.

== Plot ==
During a pep rally at South Park Elementary, demonstrators from PETA protest the use of a cow as the school's mascot. As a result, the staff at South Park Elementary ask all the students to elect a new mascot. Embarrassed by the bland choices, Kyle Broflovski jokingly suggests that one of the choices should be a "giant douche", while Eric Cartman instead suggests a "turd sandwich". Eventually, the two joke candidates get the most votes, so an election is scheduled to be held with the results counted up the following Tuesday. Kyle and Cartman aggressively promote their respective candidates, using bribery and fear mongering to gain support.

Stan Marsh does not see the point in choosing between a douche and a turd, declaring his refusal to vote. When Stan tells his family about it at dinner, his parents stress the importance of voting to Stan and argue over who he should vote for. Meanwhile, Kyle informs Sean "Puff Daddy" Combs, who, along with his entourage, intimidates Stan to vote or die. Stan agrees to vote in response to the threats, but when he is about to vote for Turd Sandwich, Kyle (who’s been unusually mean in this episode than normal) demands Stan to vote for Giant Douche instead. Disgusted with everyone's actions, Stan again refuses to vote. The school administration decides that Stan must be banished from town until he realizes the importance of voting. Stan is publicly shamed by the townspeople, bound with a bucket over his head, and placed on a horse, which leaves the town to roam while carrying Stan.

Stan and the horse are eventually approached by PETA members, who lead the pair to their compound. Stan finds that the compound's inhabitants live closely with the animals, practicing bestality and interbreeding. Stan describes his banishment to a PETA member, who explains that an election is always between a "douche" and a "turd" because they are the only candidates who succeed in politics. Combs arrives to kill Stan, but is distracted by a PETA member who stains his fur coat. Combs and his entourage retaliate by murdering all the PETA members, while sparing the animals. Stan is wounded by a stray bullet but manages to escape.

Returning to South Park, Stan is finally convinced to vote and casts a ballot for Turd Sandwich. Despite his vote, Giant Douche still wins the election in a landslide. Stan incredulously points out that his vote did not matter, but his parents assure him that all votes matter, even if it is for the losing candidate. Mr. Garrison arrives at school and alerts everyone that all the PETA members are dead, resulting in the cow being reinstated as the school mascot. Randy tells Stan that "now" his vote did not matter, much to Stan's chagrin.

== Reception and release ==
Slate described the episode as being "the epitome of everything great about the show". "Douche and Turd", along with the 13 other episodes from South Park's eighth season, was released on a three-disc DVD set in the United States on August 29, 2006. The set includes brief audio commentaries by series co-creators Trey Parker and Matt Stone for each episode.

== Politics ==
According to Nick Gillespie of Reason magazine, this episode "pretty much sums up how most libertarians approach politics". The terms were used to mock the 2004 US presidential candidates, John Kerry and George W. Bush. Douche and Turd are used again in the season 20 episode "Member Berries" and subsequent episodes of the season, in which they refer to Donald Trump (represented by Mr. Garrison) and Hillary Clinton, respectively, in the 2016 U.S. presidential election. The episode has been used to demonstrate the near-zero value of an individual vote, the intrinsic value individuals place on the act of voting itself, problems arising when voters must choose amongst undesirable candidates rather than issues, and the role of political campaigning.

== See also ==
- "Trapper Keeper", a South Park episode about the 2000 U.S. presidential election
- "About Last Night...", a South Park episode about the 2008 U.S. presidential election
- "Obama Wins!", a South Park episode about the 2012 U.S. presidential election
- "Oh, Jeez", a South Park episode about the 2016 U.S. presidential election
