= Something Wall-Mart This Way Comes =

- South Park episode
- Episode no.: Season 8 Episode 9
- Directed by: Trey Parker
- Written by: Trey Parker
- Production code: 809
- Original air date: November 3, 2004

Episode chronology
← Previous "Douche and Turd"	Next → "Preschool"
- South Park season 8

"Something Wall-Mart This Way Comes" is the ninth episode of the eighth season of the American animated television series South Park. The 120th episode of the series overall, it originally aired on Comedy Central in the United States on November 3, 2004. In the episode, a "Wall-Mart" supermarket (used as a stand-in for Walmart) is built in South Park, and the people start to get addicted to shopping from it, due to its irresistibly attractive bargains, thus leading many businesses in South Park to close down. The four boys have to fight against Wall-Mart and to find a way to stop it from taking over the entire town.

The plot of this episode is a parody of the 1983 Disney movie Something Wicked This Way Comes based on the 1962 novel by Ray Bradbury.

== Plot ==
The episode begins with Eric Cartman betting Kyle Broflovski $5 that when people die they "crap their pants", which Kyle rebuffs. Meanwhile, a Wall-Mart opens in South Park to much fanfare, and everyone in town starts shopping there. The popularity of Wall-Mart forces the local businesses to shut down, including Jim's Drugs. Local residents soon begin working at Wall-Mart for minimum wage and an extra 10% employee discount.

South Park turns into a ghost town, and the townspeople decide they no longer want to live with the Wall-Mart in their community. However they quickly fail to resist, starting to miss the bargains, so they (as a mob) ask the Wall-Mart manager to have the location closed down. Terrified, he asks them to meet him outside in five minutes. As the people stop outside his office, the manager throws himself through the window in an apparent suicide by hanging and then voids his bowels. Cartman joyfully tells Kyle that he owes him $5.

The townspeople burn the building down, only to later see it being rebuilt. A worker tells Kenny McCormick, Stan Marsh, and Kyle that Wall-Mart's headquarters in Bentonville, Arkansas ordered the rebuilding. Stan and his friends arrange a bus trip to Bentonville to stop the company but are joined by Cartman, who the Wall-Mart subliminally ordered to stop them. Though none of the boys trust him (and Kyle knows firsthand that Cartman is secretly against them), they are in a hurry to leave. They reach Bentonville, despite Cartman's attempts at sabotage, and talk to Harvey Brown, the president of Wall-Mart, who is ashamed of the damage caused by the company. The boys ask him how they can stop it, and he tells them they need to find and destroy its "heart". As the boys leave, Brown, aware of his creating what he hated most, asks the boys to tell the world "I'm sorry" and commits suicide by shooting himself in the head, despite Stan pleading with him not to, and voids his bowels afterwards. Cartman laughs and declares that Kyle now owes him $10.

The kids return home to the still-dilapidated South Park. Dressed in camouflage, they try to re-enter their town's Wall-Mart, but Cartman confronts them. Kyle angrily yells that he knew Cartman was against them all along. Kenny is then assigned to hold Cartman off while Stan and Kyle enter the Wall-Mart. In the television department, the boys are confronted by a man who says he is Wall-Mart. He tells the boys that the heart "lies beyond that plasma screen television". The boys walk over to find a small mirror. Ignoring the metaphor that the true heart of Wall-Mart is individual consumerism, they simply destroy it instead. The building begins to shake, and the Wall-Mart begins to fall apart, while the man says they will see him in his "true form". However, he does no more than rip off his mustache and jump around. The boys and everybody inside the Wall-Mart evacuate and gather with other townsfolk in the parking lot, and watch the Wall-Mart fold in on itself in a blinding flash of light, and then void its bowels (shown as the imploding building suddenly releasing a large amount of fecal matter before disappearing), causing Cartman to laugh, meaning that Kyle now owes him $15 and learned that when stores die, they "crap their pants".

Everyone cheers because Kyle tells everyone that all Wall-Marts have a self-destruct sequence if they break a mirror in the back. Randy then explains that the residents of South Park had allowed their consumerism to work against them, nearly destroying their small town's charm in the process. Realizing this, the townspeople return to shopping at Jim's Drugs, which is shown to gradually grow larger until it becomes as large as Wall-Mart and is later burned down itself. Watching it burn, the townspeople vow against shopping there again, immediately heading to the local True Value instead.

== Home media ==
"Something Wall-Mart This Way Comes", along with the thirteen other episodes from South Park's eighth season, was released on a three-disc DVD set in the United States on August 29, 2006. The set includes brief audio commentaries by series co-creators Trey Parker and Matt Stone for each episode.

== See also ==
- "Unfulfilled" and "Bike Parade", two episodes from Season 22 involving Amazon with a similar premise.
