= Goobacks =

- South Park episode
- Episode no.: Season 8 Episode 7
- Directed by: Trey Parker
- Written by: Trey Parker
- Production code: 806
- Original air date: April 28, 2004

Episode chronology
← Previous "The Jeffersons"	Next → "Douche and Turd"
- South Park season 8

"Goobacks" is the seventh episode of the eighth season of the animated television series South Park. The 118th overall episode of the series, it originally aired on Comedy Central in the United States on April 28, 2004. In production order it is the season's sixth episode.

In the episode, people from a poverty-stricken future year of 3045 travel back in time to find work, via a recently discovered time portal. When the boys try to earn some extra money, the time-traveling immigrants are willing to do the same work for next to nothing, causing the boys to lose their jobs. This affects the town's economy and the employment of the original occupants.

"Goobacks" serves as a satire of illegal immigration, and mocks both sides of the debate concerning it. The episode is widely-remembered as the origin of the catchphrase "They took our jobs!".

== Plot ==
Early in the morning, a mysterious man appears in South Park, entering from some kind of portal. Unfamiliar with his surroundings, he is hit lightly by a car. After shovelling snow, Stan, Kyle, Cartman and Kenny watch a report on CNN about the mysterious arrival. The mysterious person, who has come from over a thousand years in the future, is looking for work because of the overpopulation and poverty in his time, and he learns that the money that he earns in the 21st century will be enough to feed his family in 3045. Soon enough, large numbers of immigrants begin to come through the portal. The future people are described by CNN as "a hairless, uniform mix of all races" with the same skin color, while their language is a guttural mixture of all world languages; also, the immigrants are referred to as "Goobacks" due to having some kind of goo on them after exiting the portal (a satire of the modern slur "wetbacks" referring to Mexican immigrants), and also because they "go back" in time to the present. As the boys return to offer to shovel snow again the next day, they find that the newly arrived time-immigrants have shoveled all driveways on the street for very low pay. As the immigrants are willing to accept jobs for that kind of pay, the original workers throughout South Park are replaced, thus resulting in massive unemployment throughout the town.

At a meeting to discuss their concern with the Goobacks, construction worker Darryl Weathers complains that they have worked hard to get their pay high enough to make a living, but now are being ousted by the time-immigrants. The other workers voice their own complaints, with each sentence finishing off with an increasingly slurred and garbled exclamation of "They took our jobs!", which later becomes their slogan. Later at that meeting, Weathers has the audience suggest ideas for stopping the immigrants from arriving at the town. One man suggests everyone start stripping and engaging in a gay orgy; Weathers likes the idea, as it is the only way to stop the immigrants from coming because homosexual couples cannot spawn offspring. The protesters reluctantly agree, with the exception of Jimbo Kern, and begin the orgy.

Meanwhile, Stan's father Randy—despite initially being sympathetic to the Goobacks—loses his job to a Gooback and becomes the spokesperson of the protesters. Randy is interviewed by CNN while still naked. Next to him is a very embarrassed and disturbed Stan, who explains that he understands that the immigrants are living in poverty and they are just trying to get by but realizes that poor societies often hurt other societies instead of helping them. He suggests that the people of the present should try to make the future better so the immigrants will not need to come. The entire town begins to recycle, install solar and wind power devices, plant trees, give to the poor, etc., hoping to cause the Goobacks to disappear. Although the townspeople's efforts are successful and the Goobacks begin to fade away, the boys observe that the work is "gayer than all the men getting in a big pile and having sex with each other". Stan apologizes, and the men happily resume their orgy.

== Home media ==
"Goobacks", along with the thirteen other episodes from South Park's eighth season, was released on a three-disc DVD set in the United States on August 29, 2006. The set includes brief audio commentaries by series co-creators Trey Parker and Matt Stone for each episode.
