= Cartman's Incredible Gift =

- South Park episode
- Episode no.: Season 8 Episode 13
- Directed by: Trey Parker
- Written by: Trey Parker
- Production code: 813
- Original air date: December 8, 2004

Episode chronology
| ← Previous "Stupid Spoiled Whore Video Playset" | Next → "Woodland Critter Christmas" |
- South Park season 8

"Cartman's Incredible Gift" is the thirteenth episode in the eighth season of the American animated television series South Park. The 124th episode overall, it originally aired on Comedy Central in the United States on December 8, 2004. In the episode, local police become convinced that Eric Cartman has psychic abilities, which Cartman exploits for personal gain, much to the ire of Kyle Broflovski, other psychic detectives, and the true serial killer behind a series of murders that Cartman falsely attributes to others.

The episode's story continues South Park's critical view of psychics, previously seen in the episode "The Biggest Douche in the Universe", while also acting as a parody of several films, including Red Dragon, The Gift, and The Dead Zone.

Though a minor part of the episode, it marks the last appearance of the rarely-seen South Park Elementary school bus driver Mrs. Veronica Crabtree.

== Plot ==
Eric Cartman attempts to fly by jumping off of his roof with cardboard wings attached to his arms. Kyle roots for him, knowing what's going to happen, while the other boys try to talk him out of it. Cartman is knocked out in the fall and awakens from a brief coma in the hospital, where he shares a room with a victim of a serial killer who cuts off his victims' left hands. When Cartman makes a lucky guess and manages to deduce some obvious routine things, like the food the hospital is serving, a gullible local police detective, Sergeant Yates, believes that Cartman has developed psychic powers. Cartman plays along and is taken to a murder scene, where Yates asks him if he is "seeing anything". Cartman closes his eyes and vocalizes his cravings for ice cream and Oreo cookies, prompting Yates to arrest ice cream shop owner Tom Johannsen with extreme brutality. Cartman receives a cash reward.

At school, Kyle angrily confronts Cartman over his fraudulent psychic abilities, but Cartman defiantly insists that he has such powers, and convinces the other frightened school children of this, though not Kyle, Stan, and Kenny. The murders resume, but instead of realizing his mistake, Yates rationalizes that these are copycat killings. At the next crime scene, the boys meet a disturbed man named Michael Deets who is quite obviously the murderer, but Yates refuses to listen to Kyle's pleas, focusing instead on Cartman's fake visions.

Cartman's involvement in the case makes him famous, resulting in a visit from a group of "psychic detectives" who demand he join their group and pay a fee. Cartman laughs off their pretensions, resulting in a "psychic battle" in which the "detectives" indulge in the same histrionics as Cartman, terrifying his mother. Failing to intimidate Cartman, the psychics leave with a threat of class action lawsuit. Cartman solves this problem by telling Sergeant Yates that the group is behind the copycat murders, leading the members of the group to be arrested, beaten, and in one case, fatally shot.

Meanwhile, Kyle has followed Deets to his home, obtained fingerprint and blood samples, had them analyzed, but he is completely ignored by the police. Deciding the police will listen to him only if he himself claims psychic powers, Kyle imitates Cartman's attempted flight and is rendered comatose. When he awakens, he claims to have psychic powers and gives the police his original findings. Yates is skeptical, but goes to investigate Deets anyway, who, by this point, has abducted Cartman, furious that the self-proclaimed psychic has credited his work to others.

When Yates arrives, he prepares to arrest Deets (who introduces himself to the detective as God) upon finding many severed hands pinned to a wall in Deets's home, but stands down when he realizes that the hands on the wall appear to be right hands, not left hands, because the thumb on Yates's own left hand points to the left, cluelessly failing to notice he is looking at his hand with its palm facing up, in the opposite orientation of those on the wall. Yates leaves, not knowing that Cartman is bound and gagged in Deets's basement, but he questions his own observation about the hands. He goes back to the station, and after a montage depicting running elaborate criminology tests, exercising, and even losing track of what he was doing, he figures out his mistake, and returns to Deets's house, where he shoots Deets just before Deets can kill Cartman who begs Deets not to kill him and confesses his sins to him.

At the hospital, Johannsen and the psychics have been released from prison and Kyle is praised as a real psychic. Kyle, however, tells them there are no psychics, and that there is a logical explanation for every psychic story ever heard. The other "psychics", however, decide to reignite their conflict with Cartman, and engage in a "final battle". Kyle becomes annoyed and loudly yells at them to stop, at which point the light bulbs in the room explode and a shelf becomes partially detached from its wall, spilling its contents on the floor. Everyone is surprised by this, but Kyle shamefully insists there is a logical explanation.

== Critical reception ==
In its review of the Season 8 DVD, Quigles of JoBlo.com expressed a positive opinion of the episode, in contrast to its perceived reception by others, stating that they "laughed pretty much non-stop during it", and calling the references to Red Dragon and The Dead Zone "hilarious".

Bill Gibron of DVD Talk thought the episode was "kind of corny", stating that "Instead of being a blistering lampoon of The Dead Zone, it sort of falters, looking for an overall purpose".

Jesse Hicks, reviewing the episode for PopMatters, called it a "solid" one, despite series co-creator Trey Parker's reference to this season as "the year from hell", due to the grueling work schedule created by producing both the season and the feature film Team America: World Police.

Jonathan Barkan of Bloody Disgusting singled out as the best line of the episode Sergeant Yates's observation to Deets: "I see you like cutting the eyes out of photos with women. My son is a big fan of that too."

== See also ==
- Franz Reichelt, a French inventor who died after jumping from the Eiffel Tower using a wing-like parachute
