= Stupid Spoiled Whore Video Playset =

- South Park episode
- Episode no.: Season 8 Episode 12
- Directed by: Trey Parker
- Written by: Trey Parker
- Production code: 812
- Original air date: December 1, 2004

Episode chronology
← Previous "Quest for Ratings"	Next → "Cartman's Incredible Gift"
- South Park season 8

"Stupid Spoiled Whore Video Playset" is the twelfth episode in the eighth season of the American animated television series South Park. The 123rd episode of the series overall, it originally aired on Comedy Central in the United States on December 1, 2004. The episode was written and directed by series co-creators Trey Parker and Matt Stone. The episode parodies Paris Hilton and sex tapes made by celebrities.

In the episode, the fourth-grade girls (except Wendy) idolize the rich, famous, spoiled socialite Paris Hilton, many of them owning Hilton's brand new toy set, which comes complete with a video camera, night vision filter, some ecstasy pills, play money and a losable cell phone. Disturbed by the corruptive influence the trashy celebrity has on her classmates, Wendy seeks out Mr. Slave for advice. Meanwhile, Hilton wants to adopt Butters as her pet.

== Plot ==
A crowd is gathered to see Paris Hilton make an appearance at the local mall, where she announces the opening of a store called Stupid Spoiled Whore. Wendy is appalled by how the store blatantly objectifies women, while her friends embrace the store. Later, at a friend's house, Wendy is confronted with the Stupid Spoiled Whore Video Playset. Wendy exits in horror, leaving her friends to recreate Hilton's sex tape. Meanwhile, Hilton's dog, Tinkerbell, commits suicide to escape the misery of being her pet. In her throes of sorrow, she sees Butters, and chooses him as her replacement pet, putting him in a bear costume and calling him "Mr. Biggles".

Wendy brings her father to the Stupid Spoiled Whore store to investigate the matter. While he is initially appalled, the overly sexual women quickly manipulate him into accepting the store. Bebe announces a Stupid Spoiled Whore party at her house, refusing to invite Wendy. Meanwhile, Butters introduces Hilton to his parents. She offers them $200 million for Butters, who doesn't like the idea, but his parents insist on discussing it alone. They instruct Butters to match Hilton's offer himself to stay, and suggest he try coal mining, but he is unsuccessful. Upon seeing a photo album in her limousine, he horrifyingly discovers all her previous pets killed themselves.

While a disguised Cartman is rejected from the party, Wendy seeks Mr. Slave's help to try to become like all the other girls. After explaining to Wendy that being a whore can't be taught, he rushes to break up Bebe's party. Butters escapes from Hilton's captivity, and runs into the party. Hilton appears just in time to hear Mr. Slave telling all the girls that being a whore is not enjoyable and that she is a nobody. The two then argue over who is the bigger whore, culminating in Hilton challenging Mr. Slave to a Whore-Off, which he wins by engulfing her into his anus. Mr. Slave then criticizes the parents' unawareness that being a whore "is supposed to be a bad thing", telling them to be better role models toward their daughters. Though happy to have escaped Hilton, Butters now must face his parents' wrath. Inside Mr. Slave's colon, Hilton meets the Frog King, who instructs her to go to the small intestine, where she will meet the Sparrow Prince, who can guide her to Catatafish, who will help her escape.

== Response ==
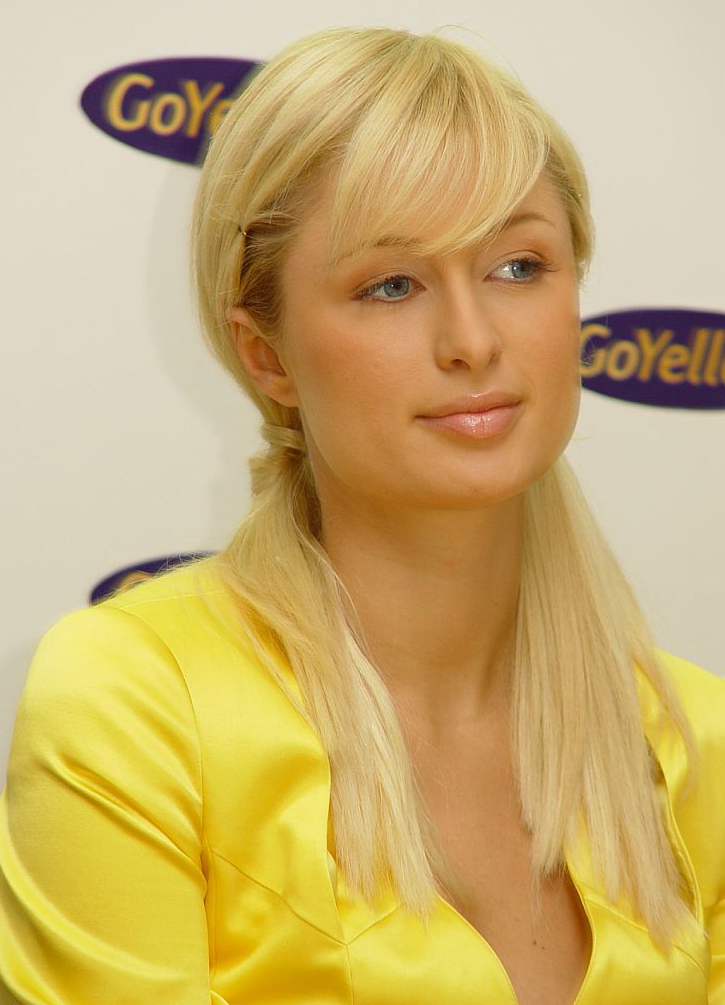
Paris Hilton (pictured in 2005) responded to the episode's satire on her.

In 2005, Paris Hilton reacted to the episode by saying, "I haven't seen it, but when people copy you, that's like the most flattering thing, so whatever people can say, I just laugh about it. It doesn't matter to me." To this, South Park co-creator Matt Stone reacted, "That shows just how fucked up she is. That's terrible that she's flattered by it." In her 2023 book Paris: The Memoir, Hilton stated that she watched the episode and felt hurt by her portrayal. In response to Stone's comment, she described that her initial reaction to the episode was a "muted red-carpet response", writing, "My not wanting to watch his cartoon about my dog being shot and me coughing up ejaculate — that’s evidence of how fucked up I am."

The British newspaper The Guardian rated the episode as one of the top ten episodes of the 2000s.

== Release ==
"Stupid Spoiled Whore Video Playset", along with the thirteen other episodes from South Park's eighth season, was released on a three-disc DVD set in the United States on August 29, 2006. The set includes brief audio commentaries by series co-creators Trey Parker and Matt Stone for each episode. The episode was also released on the two-disc DVD set titled A Little Box of Butters.
