= South Park season 8 =

Season of television series

South Park
- Season 8
- Home media release cover
- No. of episodes: 14

Release
- Original network: Comedy Central
- Original release: March 17 – December 15, 2004

Season chronology
- ← Previous; Season 7 Next → Season 9

The eighth season of South Park, an American animated television series created by Trey Parker and Matt Stone, began airing on March 17, 2004. The eighth season concluded after 14 episodes on December 15, 2004, and was written and directed by Trey Parker. The season deals with various topics that were relevant at the time of release. The episodes portray a spectrum of topics, from the effect of large scale retail corporations to illegal immigration.

== Production history ==
On the DVD commentary for the episode "Cartman's Incredible Gift," series co-creator Trey Parker referred to the eighth season as "the year from hell," due to the grueling work schedule under which he and co-creator Matt Stone worked on both the series and their feature film Team America: World Police.

== Episodes ==
No. overall	No. in season	Title	Directed by	Written by	Original release date	Prod. code	U.S. viewers (millions)
112	1	"Good Times with Weapons"	Trey Parker	Trey Parker	March 17, 2004	801	3.31
The boys buy Japanese weapons at a fair and imagine themselves as anime characters, but when Kenny injures Butters in his Professor Chaos guise with a throwing star, they must rush to get him medical attention without being caught.
113	2	"Up the Down Steroid"	Trey Parker	Trey Parker	March 24, 2004	803	3.64
Jimmy uses steroids to cheat in the Special Olympics and Cartman disguises himself as a child with a developmental disability in order to enter.
114	3	"The Passion of the Jew"	Trey Parker	Trey Parker	March 31, 2004	804	4.43
Kyle finally sees Mel Gibson's The Passion of the Christ and is convinced that Cartman was right about his Jewish deicide claims. Stan and Kenny also see the movie and hate it, prompting them to head to Malibu to retrieve their ticket money from Mel Gibson himself.
115	4	"You Got F'd in the A"	Trey Parker	Trey Parker	April 7, 2004	805	3.96
In this spoof of You Got Served, Stan recruits a Raisins girl, a Goth, and a Dance Dance Revolution master to compete against a group of breakdancers from Orange County. Butters is discovered to be a good dancer, but he has flashbacks of causing death and mayhem at a tap dancing contest.
116	5	"Awesom-O"	Trey Parker	Trey Parker	April 14, 2004	802	3.81
Butters befriends a robot (actually Cartman in disguise) he receives in the mail and takes him to Hollywood, where movie execs want him for film ideas, over 800 of which star Adam Sandler. The government pursues Cartman for national security reasons.
117	6	"The Jeffersons"	Trey Parker	Trey Parker	April 21, 2004	807	4.23
A mysterious and very eccentric new neighbor named Michael Jefferson moves into town with his sheltered son, sparking fears that he is an unfit parent, and the police scheme to frame him for crimes he didn't commit. Meanwhile, Kyle begins to worry for the man's son, who is being neglected by his father.
118	7	"Goobacks"	Trey Parker	Trey Parker	April 28, 2004	806	2.79
The townsfolk becomes angry when immigrants from the year 3045 arrive and take the residents' jobs for lower wages.
119	8	"Douche and Turd"	Trey Parker	Trey Parker	October 27, 2004	808	2.91
Stan is forced to vote in an election for the school's new mascot after the old one is protested against by PETA.
120	9	"Something Wall-Mart This Way Comes"	Trey Parker	Trey Parker	November 3, 2004	809	3.05
When a Wall-Mart store comes to South Park, the townsfolk are torn between their love of the store's low prices, and their anti-corporate hatred of the retail giant which has reduced their local business center into an abandoned ghost town.
121	10	"Pre-School"	Trey Parker	Trey Parker	November 10, 2004	810	3.26
A bully from the boys' past is paroled from juvenile hall, which sends them into hiding.
122	11	"Quest for Ratings"	Trey Parker	Trey Parker	November 17, 2004	811	3.20
The boys' school news show is in competition against a rival television program created by Craig.
123	12	"Stupid Spoiled Whore Video Playset"	Trey Parker	Trey Parker	December 1, 2004	812	3.14
Wendy feels left out when all the fourth-grade girls start emulating the slutty antics of Paris Hilton, who tries to buy Butters from his parents.
124	13	"Cartman's Incredible Gift"	Trey Parker	Trey Parker	December 8, 2004	813	2.66
Cartman thinks that he has gained paranormal powers after getting in an accident, and abuses them to become a psychic detective for hire.
125	14	"Woodland Critter Christmas"	Trey Parker	Trey Parker	December 15, 2004	814	2.58
In the show's final Christmas episode for a decade, Stan helps the woodland animals build a manger for the birth of their Lord.

== See also ==
- South Park (Park County, Colorado)
- South Park City
