= Preschool (South Park) =

- South Park episode
- Episode no.: Season 8 Episode 10
- Directed by: Trey Parker
- Written by: Trey Parker
- Production code: 810
- Original air date: November 10, 2004

Guest appearances
- Dante Alexander as Young Stan Marsh; Skyler James Sandak as Young Butters Stotch

Episode chronology
← Previous "Something Wall-Mart This Way Comes"	Next → "Quest for Ratings"
- South Park season 8

"Preschool" is the tenth episode in the eighth season of the American animated television series South Park. The 121st episode overall, it originally aired on Comedy Central in the United States on November 10, 2004. In the episode, Trent Boyett, the boys' arch-enemy from preschool, is released from juvenile hall and seeks revenge after being blamed for starting a fire that permanently disfigured their preschool teacher, Miss Claridge. Several plot elements reference the 1991 film Cape Fear as well as the Star Trek episode "The Menagerie".

== Plot ==
A horrified Stan announces to Kyle, Kenny, Cartman, and Butters that Trent Boyett, a notorious bully from their preschool years, is being released from juvenile hall after a five-year sentence. In a flashback set five years previously, the boys express interest in playing "fireman", a game in which they extinguish a fire by urinating on it. Wanting to put out an actual fire, they ask Trent to start one. However, the fire soon becomes uncontrollable and their teacher, Miss Claridge, is badly burned. Instead of going the easier way by saying that the fire was an accident and risking punishment, the four boys immediately place the sole blame on Trent. Trent attempts to have Butters defend him, but Butters, afraid of potentially being punished by his parents, declines to explain the truth, and Trent is sentenced to juvenile hall.

Now free, Trent seeks revenge. For not defending Trent despite his innocence, Butters ends up hospitalized after sustaining numerous severe injuries from Trent's childhood pranks, while his parents refuse to acknowledge that their son is in danger by forcing him to go outside and play. The boys ask a group of sixth-grade boys for protection, which they agree to in exchange for a photo of Stan's mother's breasts (which are actually Cartman's buttocks with nipple circles drawn on with a black Sharpie, using Madonna’s book Sex as a guide). After Trent overpowers all of the sixth-graders, resulting in them being hospitalized with various severe injuries, the boys ask Stan's sister, Shelley, to defend them. She softens her usually-mean stance against them upon seeing how truly terrified of Trent her brother is and offers protection, but only if they confess to Miss Claridge that they were the ones who burned her five years ago.

The boys meet Miss Claridge, who now must use a futuristic machine to get around and beep a single light on it once to say "yes" and twice to say "no", and attempt to confess about what happened five years ago, but Trent arrives to confront them before they can finish. Cartman takes out his mother's taser and fires it at Trent, but the electrodes land on Miss Claridge's electric chair instead, not only charging it back up after it had run out of battery juice and gotten stuck in the middle of the street, but also causing it to crash into a propane shop, which is destroyed in the resulting explosion that also sets her on fire, a pet shop and then a fire hydrant. When the police arrive, the boys claim total uninvolvement regarding the incident. The police then ask Miss Claridge if Trent attempted to kill her, and she replies "no" with two beeps, but the police misinterpret them as "yes, yes" and arrest Trent. As Trent is taken away, Cartman taunts him with his buttocks, but the sixth-graders, having recovered and just been released from the hospital, encounter Cartman and, mistaking the "breasts" on his buttocks for actual breasts, carry him off to pleasure themselves to the very sight of them, while a slightly panicked Cartman objects.

== Production ==
The plot is based on the 1991 film Cape Fear. Miss Claridge's motorized wheelchair is based on Christopher Pike's from Star Trek: The Original Series. The boys as pre-schoolers were voiced by actual children. The children's censored swearing is not actual swear words but instead made up of words like "big dumby". The episode started as an idea for a spin-off titled "South Park Kids".

== Home media ==
"Preschool", along with the thirteen other episodes from South Park's eighth season, was released on a three-disc DVD set in the United States on August 29, 2006. The set includes brief audio commentaries by series co-creators Trey Parker and Matt Stone for each episode.
