= The End of Serialization as We Know It =

- South Park episode
- Episode no.: Season 20; Episode 10
- Directed by: Trey Parker
- Written by: Trey Parker
- Production code: 2010
- Original air date: December 7, 2016

Guest appearance
- Elon Musk as himself

Episode chronology
← Previous "Not Funny"	Next → "White People Renovating Houses"
- South Park season 20

"The End of Serialization as We Know It" is the tenth episode and the season finale in the twentieth season of the American animated television series South Park. The 277th episode of the series overall, it first aired on Comedy Central in the United States on December 7, 2016.

The episode, while mostly concluding the season's plot, once again reiterated the season's commentary on trolling and Internet anonymity.

== Plot ==
SpaceX has finished using Heidi Turner's research to create a massive source of energy that can easily propel transport to Mars. But after realizing that Heidi intends to break his heart (according to his skewed perception), Cartman tries to convince various SpaceX staff to cancel the Mars project by explaining that his visions of life on a Mars colony ended with the enslavement of men.

Kyle and Ike have recruited all of their remaining classmates to restart skankhunt42's troll network. However, their mother, Sheila Broflovski escapes from the pantry she was previously locked in, forcing Kyle and Ike to escape using a Fulton system. As she searches for them across a crumbling South Park, Sheila ends up at the Tuckers' house where a distraught Laura Tucker reveals that she has already used Troll Trace to reveal her husband Thomas' Internet history and invites Sheila to do the same. Sheila searches Ike first and discovers that he is innocent, but cannot bring herself to search Gerald.

At The Pentagon, the US government realizes that the only way to stop TrollTrace is to overload the Internet with trolling to the point where it shuts down and resets itself. They coordinate with the trolling team in Denmark as well as Kyle and Ike to overload the system, but their effort cannot beat the now-active Troll Trace without a massive source of power: the Mars power source at SpaceX.

In Denmark, Gerald Broflovski escapes from the control room with the help of both the troll team and the betrayed Troll Trace workers. He is guided across the facility to overload TrollTrace's operations, attracting the attention of TrollTrace CEO Lennart Bedrager. Bedrager confronts Gerald on a bridge leading to the final overload switch, resulting in a debate over the nature of trolling that Gerald "wins" by kicking Bedrager in the crotch and throwing him over a railing to his death. At the SpaceX facility, Cartman evacuates Elon Musk and the workers with a fake bomb threat from NASA before distracting Heidi long enough for Butters and an allied SpaceX employee to rig the Internet to the Mars power source.

The combined effort to shut down the Internet works, destroying SpaceX and interrupting Sheila before she can complete her search for Gerald. Life returns to normal across the world as President Garrison takes his seat in the Oval Office before an assembled army of member berries. Gerald returns home to an oblivious Sheila and a furious Kyle and Ike. An old man in Florida sends out the first e-mail in the "new Internet" – to troll his friend.

== Reception ==
Jesse Schedeen from IGN rated the episode a 6.6 out of 10, summarizing his review, "There were plenty of funny moments along the way, but also a lot of plot threads left dangling and a generally anticlimactic conclusion to the TrollTrace storyline." Jeremy Lambert with 411 Mania rated it a 3.0 out of 10, stating "It was a disappointing end to a disappointing season. Too many plot holes, too many things not membered, not enough funny." Dan Caffrey with The A.V. Club rated the episode a C+, commenting "Whether it's the lack of consistent message or the emphasis on convoluted plot mechanics over jokes, South Park has felt unfocused for a few weeks now." Chris Longo with Den of Geek gave it 4 out of 5 stars, and stated "What worked in spurts last season, one of my all-time favorites, was flat here, hence the episode title. Matt (Stone) and Trey (Parker) knew it, and they had a lot of fun saving a season that didn't wholly work by stringing together a self-deprecating season finale."
