= Quintuplets 2000 =

- South Park episode
- Episode no.: Season 4 Episode 4
- Directed by: Trey Parker
- Written by: Trey Parker
- Production code: 403
- Original air date: April 26, 2000

Episode chronology
← Previous "Timmy 2000"	Next → "Cartman Joins NAMBLA"
- South Park season 4

"Quintuplets 2000" (also known as "Contorting Quintuplets 2000" in some syndicated markets and "Quintuplets" on the South Park Studios website) is the fourth episode of the fourth season of the American animated television series South Park, and the 52nd episode of the series overall. In production order, this is the 3rd episode of Season 4. It was originally broadcast on April 26, 2000. The episode is based on the Dionne quintuplets and the then-recent Elián González affair, the case of a Cuban-born child who had been taken by federal authorities four days before the episode aired.

== Plot ==
After watching Cirque Du Cheville (a "Cirque du Soleil" parody) and liking the performance of quintuplets from the show in particular, the boys hope to make a new performance artist styled circus. The boys, however, think Kenny needs to learn how to sing first. Meanwhile, the Romanian contorting quintuplets from the show, along with their grandmother, try to escape from the Romanian government hoping to bring them back. The five end up at the Marsh house, asking for shelter. Meanwhile, Kenny learns to sing opera through a fictional For Dummies installment, which features "Con te partirò" by Andrea Bocelli. At the Marsh house, Grandpa Marsh and the quints' grandmother (using her own contortion skills) have sex.

The next morning, a shocked Randy finds the grandmother died during the night. After telling the quints, and with some persuasion from Cartman, Stan, and Kyle (who hope to use the quints for their own circus), Stan's parents let the quints stay with them. The boys then decide to show the quints how great America is, taking them to, among other things, a sheep-shearing contest and a shopping mall, hoping they'll stay and do their circus. Meanwhile, the Romanian government seek Janet Reno to help get the quints back. Seeking to get to Romania for opera lessons, Kenny sings the aria "La donna è mobile" from Verdi's Rigoletto for money in order to acquire transport for him and his mother. In Romania, Kenny proves to be a successful opera singer and he and his mother decide to stay due to the currency exchange rate, with the dollar being much stronger than the local currency. Back in the US, the Marsh house is surrounded by protesters, hoping to let the quints stay. Reno dresses as the Easter Bunny and armed with a gun and an Easter Egg-shaped tear gas canister, captures the quints, but in the process destroys Stan's house. Stan, Kyle and Cartman, who don't want to lose their circus, enlist the help of the protesters outside to get the quints back.

A large, violent riot starts between the protesters and government soldiers, which is stopped by the quints after they tell off all the groups on their shortcomings: their father for pretending to miss them when he actually walked out on them five years ago, the Romanian leaders for caring little about the quints' interests and only wanting to embarrass the Americans, the protesters for having nothing better to do, and the boys (whom they consider the worst of all) for their ignorance about Romanian culture, arrogant assumptions about America's superiority, and only wanting to use the girls to perform in their circus. They get in Oprah Winfrey's limousine for an upcoming press tour and tell everyone to "Kiss our little white Romanian asses".

The Border Patrol raid during the Elián González affair is referenced in "Quintuplets 2000," which aired within the same week the event occurred.

Meanwhile, the exact opposite of the quints' situation is occurring with Kenny in Romania. With Romanians protesting outside his house to let him stay, American soldiers invade the house and Kenny is inadvertently killed by the U.S. government, who had hoped to bring him back alive.

== Production ==
As explained in the FAQ section on the official website, "When the year 2000 was coming up, everyone and their brother had '2000' in the titles of their products and TV shows. America was obsessed with 2000, so Trey Parker put '2000' in the titles to make fun of the ubiquity of the phrase." Originally, the plot involved returning the quintuplets and Kenny to their respective countries, but shortly after Elian Gonzalez was taken from his Miami relatives' home the Saturday before Easter 2000, April 22, Parker and Stone quickly changed the plot so that it would look exactly like the Miami raid.
