= About Last Night... (South Park) =

- South Park episode
- Episode no.: Season 12; Episode 12
- Directed by: Trey Parker
- Written by: Trey Parker
- Production code: 1212
- Original air date: November 5, 2008

Episode chronology
← Previous "Pandemic 2: The Startling"	Next → "Elementary School Musical"
- South Park season 12

"About Last Night…" is the twelfth episode in the twelfth season of the American animated television series South Park. The 179th episode of the series overall, it originally aired on Comedy Central in the United States on November 5, 2008.

The episode depicts Barack Obama after winning the presidential election against John McCain. In a satire of American partisan politics, mass hysteria ensues as liberals celebrate with drunken rioting and conservatives experience apocalyptic panic. Meanwhile, Obama, McCain, and their respective campaign staffs are revealed to be a gang of jewel thieves who ran for president as part of a heist. In a parody of the films Ocean's Eleven and Entrapment, Obama and McCain use the hype and fear of Election Night to carry out a high-tech heist from the Smithsonian.

== Plot ==
Following the announcement of the 2008 presidential election results, Barack Obama and John McCain address their supporters on national television as the people of South Park watch. The town's Democrats, including Randy and Sharon Marsh and the Broflovskis, express a belief that Obama is the Messiah, crudely taunt their Republican neighbors and begin to celebrate drunkenly in the streets.

Meanwhile, the town's Republicans, including the Stotches, Mr. Garrison and Mr. Mackey, sit despondently inside, certain that a liberal President means that the Apocalypse is at hand. Ike Broflovski, who supported McCain, attempts suicide by jumping out a first-story window. Certain that Ike is badly injured, Stan Marsh and Kyle Broflovski put him in a child's wagon and try to take him to the hospital.

Meanwhile, Obama and McCain are revealed to be friends and the leaders of a jewel heist club known as the "Presidential Crime Syndicate". Furthermore, Michelle Obama is really an ace computer hacker and single mother who has faked marriage to Obama to make him electable. Sarah Palin is secretly an extremely intelligent, poised, and articulate Englishwoman. The Syndicate has conspired to win the election by running Obama and McCain against each other, so that the winner can access a hidden tunnel from the Oval Office, break into the Smithsonian's Museum of Natural History, and steal the Hope Diamond.

In South Park, Stan and Kyle vainly search through the partying Democrats to find anyone who can drive Ike to the hospital. They watch as Randy, believing that Obama's win means that he no longer needs a job, punches his equally liberal boss in the face and breaks his nose. When Officer Barbrady attempts to restore order (after Stan called him over to his neighborhood), the drunken crowd assumes that he must be a Republican, loudly boos him, and overturns his police car.

Stan and Kyle find the Stotches building an "ark" while keeping many horrified conservatives from entering due to space limitations. The boys' plea for help leads to a brawl among the terrified Republicans and the boys head for the hospital on foot. They find the emergency room packed with Democrats who have partied too hard and Republicans who have tried to kill themselves.

Obama and Michelle break into the Museum, cross a room full of lasers, and steal the Hope Diamond. Ike, who had been a member of the heist the entire time, blows up a private jet that contains dummies of the criminals and alters hospital records to declare everyone involved legally dead. The next day, as the Syndicate prepares to leave the country, Obama announces that he will not be going with them. Instead, he convinces Michelle to stay behind and "give this President thing a shot".

The following morning, South Park's Republicans emerge from their "ark" and realize that the world has not ended. Realizing that they can vote Obama out later if he does a bad job, the Conservatives decide to give the new President a chance. That same morning, Randy Marsh wakes up on his couch with a severe hangover, his pants missing, and his TV having been stolen by Eric Cartman while he was out partying. Stan delivers a message from Randy's boss, telling him that he has been fired, and Randy—taking this as evidence that Obama lied to the voters—flies into a rage and shouts that he should have voted for McCain.

== Themes ==
An interpretation of the episode summarized its contents as a condemnation of those who care too much about political issues. The episode satirizes the variety of reactions from liberals and conservatives in the aftermath of election returns: "somewhere between a boozy orgy of celebratory puking in the streets and apocalyptic panic". The episode deliberately exaggerates both reactions to illustrate the absurdity.

== Production ==
"We purposely stay politically confusing. We play the spectrum from doing things that are either not political at all or spot on. ... I think stuff that works the best is not when we talk about the politics, like "If he takes Pennsylvania, he can win the whole thing!" It's more the emotions behind the politics, and why do people feel this way. And admitting we're all human beings."

— Matt Stone on staying apolitical

The episode's plot originated before the season began, when the writing team began brainstorming episode ideas. Parker and Stone noticed that an episode from the run could air the day following the election, and set their sights on producing an episode. Parker was particularly set on producing the episode after seeing the uproar over a joke from a recent Family Guy episode ("Road to Germany"), in which the character of Stewie, dressed as a Nazi, sports a McCain-Palin button. South Park had previously criticized the program with the 2006 two-parter "Cartoon Wars Part I" and "Cartoon Wars Part II", and Parker intensely disliked the joke. Rather than focus the episode's plot as satiric commentary on modern politics, the duo instead decided to create an absurd, action-movie plot inspired by the film Ocean's Eleven. "We've all heard about everything; we've talked about everything to death," Parker said. "And it's like, let's just put him in a diamond heist movie. They're just diamond thieves, and it's not about the politics at all anymore." After coming up with a neutral plot that would not disclose who would win the election, it gradually became obvious over the season that Obama would emerge the winner.

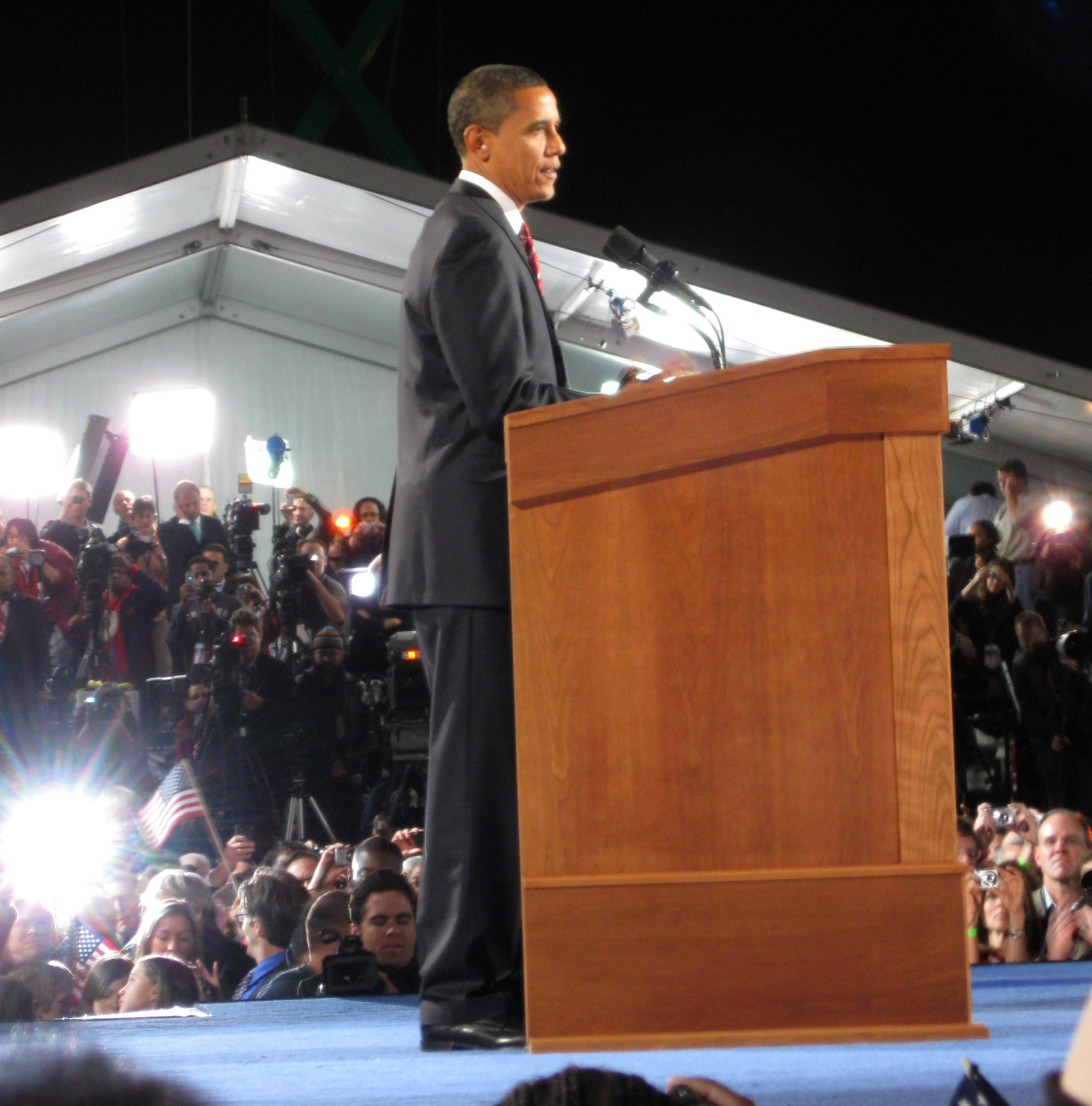
Barack Obama giving his victory speech after winning the election. Elements of the speech were included in the episode, broadcast less than 24 hours later.

Parker felt strongly over the course of the election season that Obama would win the election, so much so that he bet money on his victory in October. Parker used a sports betting website, which he normally used to gamble on football games, to predict the outcome; the website placed the odds heavily against McCain. The team initially intended to create an alternate version in case McCain won, but found the prospect too daunting, considering their quick production schedule. In a possible scenario in which McCain was declared the winner, the duo intended to air the completed episode as is and deal with what was termed their "Dewey Defeats Truman" moment later. Possible outcomes included doing a drunken Mystery Science Theater 3000-esque commentary over the completed version, in which lines are poorly dubbed over the dialogue. Rather than partying in the streets, Obama supporters would be rioting, while McCain supporters would hide in the Ark to protect themselves from the riot, rather than a world in which their candidate loses. "There was a really stressful fifteen minutes there where we thought 'Oh man, what if we're wrong?' We really banked on it", said Stone.

In choosing which characters would be liberal or conservative, Stone admitted the choices were sometimes arbitrary. The character of Randy getting inebriated was always something the team found humorous; as a result, it was natural he become a hard-partying Obama supporter. In contrast, Mr. Garrison, who in the series is a "self-hating gay man", is portrayed as a McCain supporter to provide irony. In one possible storyline, then-President George W. Bush would heroically take the blame for the diamond heist, in a parody of Christopher Nolan's The Dark Knight, but it was rejected as jokes about Bush had become overdone. The episode includes details such as excerpts from Obama's victory speech and the stage and podium on which he spoke. For the victory and concession speeches, Parker wrote placeholder lines until after the election's outcome. Following Obama's victory speech, the duo found it remarkable the amount of placeholder material that turned out similar to the actual speech. Comedy Central, as usual, saw few finished sequences before the episode went to air, but raised questions over one scene in which Obama's grandmother "fakes" her death (Obama's real grandmother had passed the day preceding the election).

The episode was completed on the morning of its air date, hours after they typically complete episodes. "We're delivering it right up against the wire every single week. ... Trey and I got home at 10:30 yesterday morning," said Stone to an interviewer the day following the episode's broadcast.

== Reception ==
Sean O'Neal of The A.V. Club commended the episode's apolitical approach, but wished "tonight's inconsequential silliness had been a little funnier across the board". Alan Sepinwall of The Star-Ledger criticized the episode as a "half-hour SNL sketch", commenting that only the first five minutes he felt were humorous. Newsweek criticized the episode as a "lukewarm parody" in a 2010 article criticizing the creative state of the program. "While this episode was perhaps not as funny as it could have been, it manages to feel poignant," said Travis Fickett of IGN.

"Trey Parker and Matt Stone have always turned around South Park episodes with impressive speed, but Wednesday night was ridiculous," said James Hibberd of The Hollywood Reporter.

== Home release ==
"About Last Night...", along with the thirteen other episodes from South Park's twelfth season, were released on a three-disc DVD and Blu-ray set in the United States on March 10, 2009. The sets included brief audio commentaries by Parker and Stone for each episode, a collection of deleted scenes, and two special mini-features, The Making of 'Major Boobage and Six Days to South Park.

== See also ==
- "Trapper Keeper", a South Park episode about the 2000 U.S. presidential election
- "Douche and Turd", a South Park episode about the 2004 U.S. presidential election
- "Obama Wins!", a South Park episode about the 2012 U.S. presidential election
- "Oh, Jeez", a South Park episode about the 2016 U.S. presidential election
