= Cartman Joins NAMBLA =

- South Park episode
- Episode no.: Season 4 Episode 5
- Directed by: Eric Stough
- Written by: Trey Parker
- Production code: 309
- Original air date: June 21, 2000

Episode chronology
← Previous "Quintuplets 2000"	Next → "Cherokee Hair Tampons"
- South Park season 4

"Cartman Joins NAMBLA" is the fifth episode of the fourth season of the animated television series South Park, and the 53rd episode of the series overall. It originally aired in the United States on June 21, 2000, on Comedy Central.

In the episode, Eric Cartman, in search of more mature friends, accidentally joins the "North American Man/Boy Love Association" (NAMBLA), and puts all the boys of South Park in jeopardy as a result. Meanwhile, Kenny tries to stop his mother and father from having another baby.

== Plot ==
The logo of the North American Man/Boy Love Association, which Cartman accidentally joins during the episode.

After deciding he is too mature to hang out with Stan, Kyle, and Kenny, Cartman looks for older male friends. Cartman joins an online chat room full of eager men who he believes want to be friends with him; they are actually Internet predators who prey on young boys. Cartman meets one predator at Mel's Buffet, who is quickly arrested by federal agents for soliciting sex from a minor. The next day, Cartman meets another predator who turns out to be Mr. Garrison, who is also arrested. Both men are held by the South Park police under the watch of Officer Barbrady. Representatives of the North American Man/Boy Love Association (NAMBLA), a pro-pedophilia organization, show up to demand the release of what they call the "political prisoners" held there, but Barbrady holds firm and sends the activists off.

Cartman does not understand why this keeps happening and naively concludes that Stan and Kyle are responsible for the arrests. Cartman visits Dr. Mephesto to ask where he might find mature friends. Dr. Mephesto recommends joining an organization known as "NAMBLA", although he doesn't explain the nature of the organization. Cartman joins NAMBLA and is made their poster boy. The organization holds a banquet in Cartman's honor and asks him to invite all the boys in town. Cartman does so, with the exception of Stan and Kyle.

Federal agents, having learned that NAMBLA is meeting in South Park, raid the venue. However, they discover that they have raided Dr. Mephesto's group meeting of "NAMBLA", but instead of being the pedophile group, it's an unrelated, law-abiding group that happens to share the acronym with NAMBLA: the National Association of Marlon Brando Look-Alikes. The FBI teams up with the Marlon Brando lookalikes (who have been trying to get rid of the other NAMBLA for years, in large part due to a years-long ownership conflict over the nambla.com domain name) to stop the other NAMBLA's banquet and protect the children of South Park. There, all the boys in town (including Stan and Kyle who were also invited) are in attendance, unaware of what is in store for them until the pedophiles take them to their hotel rooms, after which the boys run screaming in the halls.

Meanwhile, Stuart and Carol McCormick are trying to have another baby. As Kenny does not like the idea, he tries to stop them by throwing a fastball at his father's crotch to shatter his left testicle, causing Stuart to vomit from the extreme pain. When his mother gets pregnant anyway, he adds morning-after pills to a chocolate milk/vodka cocktail and gives it to his mother, who politely refuses the drink because of her pregnancy. Stuart drinks it and it causes him to vomit and defecate. Later, Kenny convinces his family to go with him to North Park Funland to ride The John Denver Experience, a violent ride not recommended for pregnant women. Carol enjoys herself and suffers no apparent ill-effects; however, Kenny's father gets a broken nose from the ride and ends up vomiting, defecating, and now, draining his bloody nose into a garbage can. Enraged at his failures, Kenny chases Carol through the town and into the NAMBLA hotel with a plunger, attempting to plunge the fetus out of her. Upon seeing this, Stuart angrily chases after Kenny to stop him from hurting his mother and their unborn child.

The two plots collide when the Marlon Brando look-alikes and the federal agents arrive at the hotel, and a madcap chase with the boys, both NAMBLAs (one of which are running naked), and the feds ensues. Kenny, still chasing after his mother and in turn being chased by his father, joins in. Cartman decides that Butters should be the sacrificial lamb for the pedophiles to have their way with. While Butters is sent into an empty room and leaves unharmed, Stuart enters a room to search for Kenny, only to find the NAMBLA pedophiles, who somehow mistake him for a little boy and proceed to gang-rape him.

In the end, all of the North American Man/Boy Love Association members are apprehended by the FBI and the Marlon Brando lookalikes. They try to weasel their way out of jailtime by giving out a speech falsely equating pedophilia with being an oppressed minority and that they simply cannot help their sexual attraction to young boys. However, Stan and Kyle reject this, stating that, while they believe in tolerance and equality for all, pedophiles are criminals who hurt children and should be treated as such. As the pedophiles are taken away to custody, Cartman backhandedly apologizes to his friends for almost getting them raped, assuring that they will "blossom into maturity" someday.

Stuart - who by this point has had his testicles shattered, body poisoned, nose broken, and even been violated by dozens of pedophiles - is loaded into an ambulance, which accidentally goes in reverse and runs over Kenny, killing him instantly. Afterwards, Carol gives birth to an identical child they name Kenny, which she says is the fifty-second time that it has happened.

== Production ==
"Cartman Joins NAMBLA" was written by series co-creators Trey Parker and Matt Stone, was directed by Eric Stough, and was rated TV-MA in the United States and 15 in the United Kingdom.
