= Fort Collins (South Park) =

- South Park episode
- Episode no.: Season 20; Episode 6
- Directed by: Trey Parker
- Written by: Trey Parker
- Production code: 2006
- Original air date: October 26, 2016

Episode chronology
← Previous "Douche and a Danish"	Next → "Oh, Jeez"
- South Park season 20

"Fort Collins" is the sixth episode in the twentieth season of the American animated television series South Park. The 273rd episode of the series overall, it originally aired on Comedy Central in the United States on October 26, 2016.

The episode lampooned the cyberattack affecting the East Coast, progressed the plot of the previous episodes and also echoed the season's previous commentary on nostalgia, trolling and Internet anonymity.

== Plot ==
In the aftermath of Gerald Broflovski and his Internet troll friend Dildo Schwaggins' successful trolling of Denmark, Schwaggins brings his team over to the Broflovskis' house to celebrate. However, despite having become obsessed with trolling, Gerald is annoyed that the trolls want their relationship with him to continue and grow, causing him to angrily rebuff Schwaggins' repeated attempts to build a real friendship.

Heidi Turner and Cartman show Kyle a bulletin board in Heidi's room, where she deduced through emoji analysis that Skankhunt42 was actually a parent of one of the students, although she never found out his identity before she was forced to go offline. Using Heidi's methods, the Danes activate their troll identification website known as Troll Trace and target one of the troll team's members in the city of Fort Collins, Colorado, publicizing all of its citizens' Internet histories in the process. As the city collapses from the chaos, the troll from Fort Collins is burned alive by the father of one of his victims.

When Gerald discovers that the Danes are close to finding him out, he panics and begs Schwaggins for help, but Schwaggins rejects Gerald for spurning his friendship. When Cartman visits Kyle to try to get him to apologize for supposedly offending Heidi for not being funny, Kyle openly suggests that he would use Troll Trace to reveal Cartman's bigoted past and send the information to Heidi. Cartman lies to Heidi about his past, specifically about his negative reaction to the female cast of the Ghostbusters remake, but despite her reassurances, he worries that she will eventually find out.

Randy Marsh and Mr. Garrison discover that they cannot kill off the member berries, which are using their nostalgia-inducing abilities to influence the public to vote for Garrison over Hillary Clinton. Clinton's aides are also concerned about the possible release of her Internet activities due to Troll Trace, and they suggest that only Skankhunt42 can help her. Randy convinces Garrison to make one final speech "from the heart" to convince his followers to support Clinton. However, the member berries have become intelligent themselves and they attempt to counter Garrison's sabotage by infesting his running mate Caitlyn Jenner.

== Reception ==
Jesse Schedeen from IGN rated the episode a 9.2 out of 10 and summarized that "South Park's 20th Season keeps getting weirder and more entertaining every week." Jeremy Lambert with 411 Mania rated it a 7 out of 10 and commented "I enjoyed this weeks [sic] episode. I had my issues with it, but there were a lot of laughs and things seem to be moving in the right direction, even if I don't agree with it." Dan Caffrey with The A.V. Club rated it as a B+, noting "Much of this is likely setup for the next few episodes, and as such, focuses more on exposition and—honest to God—emotion." Chris Longo with Den of Geek gave it 3.5 out of 5 stars and ended his review stating "South Park typically does a strong job of moving forward without totally blanking its past. Let’s see if its characters can follow suit."
