= Not Funny =

- South Park episode
- Episode no.: Season 20; Episode 9
- Directed by: Trey Parker
- Written by: Trey Parker
- Production code: 2009
- Original air date: November 30, 2016

Guest appearance
- Elon Musk as himself

Episode chronology
← Previous "Members Only"	Next → "The End of Serialization as We Know It"
- South Park season 20

"Not Funny" is the ninth episode in the twentieth season of the American animated television series South Park. The 276th episode of the series overall, it originally aired on Comedy Central in the United States on November 30, 2016.

The episode, while mostly working towards the season's conclusion, briefly reiterated the season's commentary on trolling.

== Plot ==
As global panic over Troll Trace causes a large crowd to gather outside the barricaded SpaceX facility in hopes of escaping to Mars, Cartman confronts Butters over his advances on Heidi Turner. Butters reveals that he was doing so in order to get Cartman to break up with Heidi before she can break his heart. An increasingly panicked Cartman repeatedly asks Heidi to tell more jokes, but she concentrates fully on using her "emoji analysis" technique to solve the problems required to launch a Mars rocket. She is finally able to solve the problem, but Cartman's panic makes him doubt his relationship with Heidi.

In Denmark, the Troll Trace CEO, now named Bedrager, has Gerald Broflovski and the rest of the trolling team stripped naked and brought to a holding room where Gerald presumes they will be killed. However, Bedrager then brings Gerald back to his control room where he explains that he is faking being a Dane and that he had really designed Troll Trace to set the entire world against each other just for laughs, as Gerald had done previously on a smaller scale. He then seals Gerald in the control room, as his locked-in Troll Trace workers and the trolling team watch each other simultaneously get rickrolled.

After being caught and brought back home by their mother Sheila, Kyle and Ike decide to rally a panicking South Park to take vengeance on Troll Trace. They manage to convince Mr. Slave to anger President Garrison into bombing Denmark. However, when Sheila informs Kyle that his father Gerald is still in Denmark, Kyle then angers Garrison into calling off the attack. Kyle and Ike eventually lock Sheila, who has become furious when chasing Ike after the latter says profanities to her, in the family pantry so they can use the computer against her wishes in order to take action.

== Reception ==
Jesse Schedeen of IGN gave the episode an 8.6 out of 10, saying "South Park's 20th season delivered another winner, as the show went on the offensive against President Garrison." Jeremy Lambert of 411 Mania rated it a 5.5 out of 10, stating "I've been disappointed with the overall lack of direction in the season. They have one episode to tie everything together and give a satisfactory conclusion, but I just don’t know if it'll happen." Dan Caffrey with The A.V. Club rated it a C+, stating "South Park has proven time and time again that it can do better than the rehashed "gotcha" moment. Hopefully next week's finale will get away from this conceit, which seems to be turning into the default strategy for the season."
