= Member Berries =

- South Park episode
- Episode no.: Season 20; Episode 1
- Directed by: Trey Parker
- Written by: Trey Parker
- Production code: 2001
- Original air date: September 14, 2016

Episode chronology
| ← Previous "PC Principal Final Justice" | Next → "Skank Hunt" |
- South Park season 20

"Member Berries" is the first episode in the twentieth season of the American animated television series South Park. The 268th episode of the series overall, it premiered on Comedy Central in the United States on September 14, 2016.

The episode lampooned the massive national media coverage of Colin Kaepernick and other American athletes' protest during "The Star-Spangled Banner" and the presidential campaigns of Donald Trump and Hillary Clinton while also commenting on nostalgia and reboots. It also parodies the signaling by lights at the window at the start of the American Revolution, with J. J. Abrams showing lights at his window.

A girls' volleyball match in the South Park gymnasium is massively attended by the townspeople. The vast majority are there to see how many of the players will sit down during the national anthem to protest a misogynist Internet troll known as Skankhunt42 on their school's message boards, and Randy Marsh has placed a bet. Meanwhile, Congress decides that "The Star-Spangled Banner" needs a reboot to fix the division caused by the protests, and turns to J. J. Abrams for help.

Randy later assures a Gallup pollster that his family will vote for the "turd sandwich instead of the giant douche" much to Stan's annoyance. Stressed by the political climate, Stephen Stotch recommends eating a superfruit called "member berries" to relax. The member (i.e. remember) berries, which are small purple berries that utter nostalgic phrases, initially relax Randy, but he is shocked when the berries suddenly start spouting overtly political talking-points with a heavy conservative bent, reminiscing about the Reagan Era, when there "weren't so many Mexicans", and when gay marriage was not legal, so he stops eating them.

As Mr. Garrison ("Giant Douche") and his running mate Caitlyn Jenner's presidential campaign picks up steam, he quickly realizes that he will be unable to carry out his ludicrous campaign promises. As he also cannot quit without "looking like a jackass", he vows to continue running but in a way that will ensure victory for Hillary Clinton ("Turd Sandwich"), although he cannot figure out how to do it until a newscaster announces the rebooted anthem. Garrison decides to sit out the anthem at a football game between the San Francisco 49ers and the Carolina Panthers attended by both him and Clinton, only to be thwarted by the fact that Abrams' reboot simply allows people to choose whether to sit, stand or kneel to honor America.

Kyle Broflovski and the victimized girls strongly suspect that Eric Cartman is responsible for the messages, but cannot prove it. Cartman also denies being Skankhunt42, although he does not help his case by attempting to host a girls' stand-up comedy session in the gym and pretending to have been attacked by the girls afterward. At the end of the episode it is revealed that Skankhunt42 is actually Kyle's father, Gerald.

== Reception ==
Jesse Schedeen from IGN rated the episode a 6.2 out of 10, classifying it as "Okay". Schedeen enjoyed the jokes and gags from the episode, but felt the "many warring subplots failed to coalesce into a satisfying whole". Kevin Johnson with The A.V. Club rated the episode as B+, and commented how he enjoyed the fact that the show "has managed to consistently find ways to reinvent itself, whether by leaning harder on its satirical edge, developing its cast in deeper, unique ways, improving the scale of the animation, or establishing longer story arcs". Chris Longo with Den of Geek gave the episode 2.5 out of 5 stars, and noted that this season already appears to be "converging into some big conspiracy, which hasn't been the show's strength".

The episode was nominated for Outstanding Animated Program at the 69th Primetime Emmy Awards.
