= Subject matter in South Park =

Topics in the television series South Park

The American animated sitcom South Park has covered and satirized a large number of topics over the course of its run. South Park Studio's use of computer animation with primarily two-dimensional assets allows it to edit episodes in days, quickly commenting on recent events, including Elián González, the 2000 U.S. presidential election, the capture of Saddam Hussein, and the elections of both Barack Obama and Donald Trump. The creators also have engendered a mix of socially liberal and fiscally conservative viewpoints, espousing a libertarian ideology in both real life and on the show. However, the show's creators call themselves "equal opportunity offenders" and reject the notion that they are trying to put forth any consistent ideological agenda through the show.

== List ==
=== Abortion ===
Abortion is heavily lampooned in South Park.

- "Cartman's Mom Is Still a Dirty Slut": Cartman's Mom attempted to get her son a "40th trimester" abortion, and finds out that such a late abortion is illegal, she says "Well, I think you need to keep your laws off of my body." Later in the episode, Mrs Cartman says "I should've thought of raising a child before having sex." She was later informed that she confused the word "abortion" with "adoption".
- "Cartman Joins NAMBLA": Upon learning that his parents want to have another child, Kenny attempts to prevent the event of having a younger sibling. He attempts to give his mother morning-after abortion pills, tries to get her to drink liquor and encourages her to ride on an intense amusement park attraction in order to provoke a miscarriage. None of his attempts work, however, leaving the newborn child to become a miniature reincarnation of Kenny himself.
- "Chef Goes Nanners": The substitute teacher shows that the class had participated in different debates, with one being "Pro-Choice vs. Cartman".
- "Kenny Dies": Cartman attempts to get stem cell research (using aborted fetuses) legalized in a feigned attempt to save Kenny's life. It is revealed at the end of the episode he really wanted to use stem cells to clone Shakey’s Pizza.
- "A Ladder to Heaven": Upon realizing that Kenny's soul is inside his body, Cartman decides to go somewhere where they "remove living souls from inside" of him. He then proceeds to go to an abortion clinic where he gets into an argument with the lady at the counter, stating that he can't live this way and demanding that they just suck Kenny's soul out. A couple walk in and upon hearing Cartman's rant, the girlfriend states that she "can't do this" and runs out. At that point, the visibly angry boyfriend throws a rock at Cartman.
- "Woodland Critter Christmas": The mountain lion cubs are taught at an abortion clinic how to stop the Antichrist porcupine from being born. During the episode's final confrontation, they give Kyle an "abortion", expelling the Antichrist from his body so that Santa can crush it with a sledgehammer.
- "Mr. Garrison's Fancy New Vagina": The newly sex-changed Mrs. Garrison becomes convinced she is pregnant because she doesn't start menstruating. She asks the doctor whether he would "vacuum it (the fetus) out or scramble its brains" because "a woman can do whatever she wants with her body," only to find out at the abortion clinic that uteruses are not created in sex change operations; therefore she cannot get pregnant.
- "Eek, a Penis!": Cartman spends most of the episode teaching inner-city kids that it is okay to cheat. In counseling a pregnant teenager, he says that "Abortion isn't wrong...abortion is the ultimate form of cheating. You're cheating nature itself. Why do rich white girls get ahead in life? Because they get abortions when they're young. They get pregnant, but they still want to go to college, so, whatever, they just cheat. They cheat that little critter in their belly out of a chance at life."
- South Park: The Stick of Truth: A section of the game takes place in the abortion clinic, named Unplanned Parenthood, as the New Kid goes undercover dressing as a girl to recover a girl's abortion records for Wendy's crew. Along the way, he has to perform an "abortion" on Randy Marsh in disguise to fool the government agents and deal with an outbreak of Nazi Zombie Fetuses that overrun the clinic. This section was censored in the release of the game in certain regions.

=== Canadians ===
Canadians are heavily satirized in South Park. Most Canadians are depicted as having beady eyes, and the top halves of their heads simply flap up and down when they speak. They also exhibit exaggerated Canadian stereotypes. This traces back to the season one episode "Death", which introduced the Canadian comedy duo Terrance and Phillip. The episode was inspired by early criticism that South Park was little more than flatulence jokes and primitive animation. And thus Terrance and Phillip literally did nothing but a series of flatulence jokes, and were rendered in cruder animation than South Park itself. South Park creators Trey Parker and Matt Stone then decided to extend the visual running gag to all of Canada after Terrance and Phillip were later featured in the season two premiere "Terrance and Phillip in Not Without My Anus". Canada is featured prominently in several episodes such as "It's Christmas in Canada", "Canada on Strike", and "Where My Country Gone?" as well as the film South Park: Bigger, Longer & Uncut.

The British royal family, in their capacity as the Canadian royal family, has also been satirized in the episodes "Royal Pudding" and "The Worldwide Privacy Tour".

=== Celebrities ===
- Barbra Streisand: in "Mecha-Streisand", "200", and "201", she gains evil-powers and destroys the town as a Mechagodzilla-style creature; in "Spookyfish", different visages from her TV and film work appear as "Spooky Streisand" sidebars. Her name also seems to be something of a curse word in the South Park universe, as in South Park: Bigger, Longer & Uncut and "Osama bin Laden Has Farty Pants."
- Robert Smith from The Cure: In "Mecha-Streisand", he is called in to defeat Barbra Streisand by turning in to a Mothra-like creature to take her down. However, he has an ability called "Robot Punch", which his a reference to many mecha anime.
- "Starvin' Marvin" and "Starvin' Marvin in Space" lampoon the charity efforts of Sally Struthers, who appears as a Jabba the Hutt figure in the latter episode.
- Dr. Oz: in "Butterballs", Dr. Oz spouts false medical babble and bullies Butters while interviewing him about the anti-bullying video he is starring in.
- "Butters' Very Own Episode": The parents of Butters Stotch try to conceal Butters' mother's attempted murder of their son with the help of Gary Condit, O. J. Simpson, and the parents of JonBenét Ramsey.
- "Fat Butt and Pancake Head": Cartman makes a Jennifer Lopez hand puppet, which suddenly develops a personality of its own and becomes a singing sensation. As a result, the real J-Lo is fired from her record label and Ben Affleck falls in love with the hand puppet.
- Affleck, prior to "Fat Butt and Pancake Head", also appears in "How to Eat with Your Butt", where it is revealed that he is the long-lost son of a couple suffering from a fictitious congenital condition called "torsonic polarity syndrome" (TPS), which causes victims to appear to have buttocks in place of their face.
- Rob Reiner is derided as a hypocritical activist who works to outlaw smoking in public places for reasons of health, despite the fact that he is obese on account of poor dietary habits, in "Butt Out". His obesity hits home whenever he needs butter to get out of tight places such as a car.
- John Edward's mentalist/medium practices are criticized in "The Biggest Douche in the Universe".
- Jared Fogle is satirized in "Jared Has Aides": a play on his use of personal trainers in the episode. He also appeared in the episode "Stunning and Brave" and the video game South Park: The Fractured but Whole.
- Russell Crowe is playfully mocked for his Gladiator role, his music and his violent fights in "The New Terrance and Phillip Movie Trailer".
- "The Biggest Douche in the Universe": Rob Schneider is shown in four movie previews. The previews depict Schneider transforming into a stapler, a carrot, and Kenny McCormick. One of the previews is more like a template with often used phrases "Until one day", "From the creators of", and "Rob Schneider is" between which it's filled with nonsensical gibberish. Schneider is shown dancing in a discothèque, walking into a lamp post, drinking some liquid in a laboratory, and falling down stairs.
- Mel Gibson is the subject of Cartman's admiration after Cartman watches Gibson's film, The Passion of the Christ, culminating in "The Passion of the Jew", wherein Gibson responds to Stan and Kenny's demand for a refund of the money they spent on The Passion by masochistic tendencies with which he accuses Stan and Kenny of threatening to torture him, and by chasing after the two after they steal the money from his home. He later defecates on Cartman and smears his feces on a South Park building, ruining his standing with Cartman and his Christian South Park fans. He later appears in the "Imaginationland Episode III", in which he provides story ideas to the United States government, in order to inspire a possible avenue of investigation into the invasion of Imaginationland. Despite his bizarre, erratic behavior, the Pentagon officials observe, his experience as a director and his understanding of story structure actually provide a useful idea, where previous directors consulted, Michael Bay and M. Night Shyamalan, merely suggested special effects and plot twists.
- Michael Jackson is portrayed with the character "Mr. Jefferson" in the episode "The Jeffersons", in which he moves to South Park with his son Blanket to a house full of arcade games and animals, inevitably attracting all the kids in the town.
- Jackson is later parodied in the season 13 episode "Dead Celebrities" as a ghost possessing Ike because of his denial of being dead, being a man, being an adult and being black.
  - "Dead Celebrities" also featured Billy Mays, Ed McMahon, Farrah Fawcett, Patrick Swayze, Walter Cronkite, Dom DeLuise, Ted Kennedy, Natasha Richardson, Bea Arthur, David Carradine, DJ AM, Ricardo Montalbán, and Steve McNair as celebrities trapped in purgatory, which is like being in a plane on the tarmac, because Michael Jackson refuses to acknowledge his death.
  - The Boys get help from Ghost Hunters co-stars Jason Hawes and Grant Wilson in the same episode.
- Paris Hilton is caricatured as a "skank" in "Stupid Spoiled Whore Video Playset". The episode implies (and in some cases explicitly states) that Paris Hilton is a stupid, spoiled, drunken whore who has done nothing to deserve her fame except being rich and spoiled. The episode also criticizes how she has become a role model for young girls (the girls of South Park, with the exception of Wendy Testaburger, quickly take up her supposedly promiscuous and mindless attitude towards life after the opening of the "Stupid spoiled whore" shop).
- Tom Cruise and John Travolta are famously caricatured in "Trapped in the Closet" for their participation in Scientology. This episode resulted in the departure of Isaac Hayes as Chef in "The Return of Chef", where Chef is brainwashed into a made-up organization lampooning Scientology (of which Hayes is a member, and claimed religious insult because of "Closet"). The title of the "Closet" episode references "Trapped in the Closet" by R. Kelly, who is also a participant in "Closet."
- Prior to "Trapped in the Closet", Travolta was featured in "The Entity", demonstrating Mr. Garrison's mono-wheel vehicle known as "IT."
- George Clooney is considered a source of "smug" in "Smug Alert!" for his speech giving Hollywood credit in the American Civil Rights Movement, and in the movie for the doctor.
- "Super Best Friends": David Blaine is the leader of a cult known as "Blaintology".
- "Red Hot Catholic Love": Martha Stewart uses Cartman's method of digestion (which involves shoving food up the anus and defecating out the mouth) to eat a whole turkey.
- "Here Comes the Neighborhood": Token convinces rich African-American celebrities such as Will Smith, Oprah Winfrey, Snoop Dogg, Sean Combs and Bill Cosby (who is shown having an obsession with Jell-O pudding) to move to South Park. Oprah also makes an appearance on the episode "A Million Little Fibers", where she talks about selecting Towelie's memoirs as her book of the month.
- U.S. Army troops mistake a goat for Fleetwood Mac lead vocalist Stevie Nicks in the episode "Osama bin Laden Has Farty Pants".
- "Tsst": Cesar Millan from the show Dog Whisperer is brought in to discipline Cartman after Nanny 911 and Supernanny fail.
- Al Gore is satirized in the episode "ManBearPig", where he warns the town of South Park about a terrible creature that is "half-man, half-bear and half-pig."
- Both are further explored in Season 22 as both Gore and ManBearPig return. Gore becomes a friend of the boys as they try to defeat the monster.
- "Ginger Kids": When Cartman presents his report about red-haired, pale-skin, freckled people, his slideshow displays pictures of Carrot Top and Ron Howard.
- The Fab Five from Queer Eye for the Straight Guy are parodied as Crab People in the episode "South Park Is Gay!".
- "The Snuke": Hillary Clinton has a nuclear weapon in her vagina.
- "Britney's New Look": Britney Spears' popularity is due to her being a sacrifice for corn Harvest.
- Both Taylor Swift and Faith Hill were parodied in South Park.
- "About Last Night...": Barack Obama, John McCain, Sarah Palin, and Michelle Obama are members of an elite team of professional thieves after the Hope Diamond.
- Bono is parodied in the episode "More Crap", which highlights his humanitarian efforts, coupled with his pretentious, often narcissistic personality. It's revealed that he is actually a world-record setting "piece of crap"; Stan explains: "That's why he's able to do so much, try to help so many people, but still seem like such a piece of shit." Measurements in the episode are measured in Courics.
- "Imaginationland Episode II": Kurt Russell is depicted making fun of the film Stargate. He goes into the imagination portal where he is raped by Cartman's made-up forest critters.
- "The Ring": The Jonas Brothers are part of an evil plot by Mickey Mouse, unbeknownst to The Jonas Brothers, to help Mickey Mouse sell sex to young girls.
- "Sexual Healing": Instead of claiming responsibility for the sex scandals, various celebrities such as Michael Douglas, Michael Jordan, Ben Roethlisberger, David Duchovny, Charlie Sheen, David Letterman, Bill Clinton, Billy Bob Thornton, Kobe Bryant, Eliot Spitzer, and Tiger Woods use excuses such as sex addiction cast on them by an "Alien Wizard" to justify their own actions.
- "Prehistoric Ice Man": Marilyn Manson is performing a song called "Stinky Britches" on a TV in a shop before Larry angrily smashes the glass and the TV.
- Rick Santorum, Mitt Romney, and Newt Gingrich are seen in the episode "Faith Hilling" following Cartman in pulling their shirts out to simulate breasts.
- Author George R. R. Martin appears in the season 17 episodes "A Song of Ass and Fire" and "Titties and Dragons", where he's first visited by Butters and Scott Malkinson and goes on an hours-long rant after being asked a simple question, in particularly showing an obsession for "wieners".
- The singer Lorde is portrayed in Season 18 as none other than the secret identity of character Randy Marsh.
- Dallas Cowboys owner Jerry Jones is parodied in the season 18 episode "Go Fund Yourself" along with several other NFL team owners. In one scene, Jones is depicted as having huge, bulging chameleon-like eyes, as a young woman's head pops up from his lap. He reappears in the season 21 episode "Moss Piglets."
- Caitlyn Jenner was mocked in several episodes of the nineteenth season, with many episodes referencing Jenner's hit-and-run accident (by showing Jenner driving over numerous people).
- Donald Trump is personified from Season 19 onwards by the South Park character Mr. Garrison, who beats Hillary Clinton in the 2016 Presidential Election and even puts on an orange wig to more closely resemble the real-life Donald Trump.
- Mitch McConnell, Paul Ryan, and Mike Pence appear in the episode "Doubling Down" advising Mr. Garrison that his slogan "Fuck them all to death!" is going too far, only to be threatened and bullied into submission.
- Rudy Giuliani appears in the episode "Season Finale" as Mr. Garrison's (and thus metaphorically Donald Trump's) lawyer.
- Mark Zuckerberg appears in the episode "Franchise Prequel", where he is invited to talk about fake news stories on Facebook but then does not address the citizens' concerns, instead dismissing their complaints and pretending to deflect their attempts to "block" him by speaking and moving in the style of blocking techniques from martial arts films.
- Jeff Bezos appears in "Unfulfilled" and "Bike Parade" as in the form of the lead Talosian from the original 1965 Star Trek pilot "The Cage". He watches people through hidden cameras in their Amazon Echos and stamps out any dissenters or strikers against Amazon.

=== Censorship ===
The primary subject of South Park: Bigger, Longer & Uncut is censorship, also a repeatedly cited concern in multiple episodes. Notable episodes involving censorship include "Death", "It Hits the Fan", "Cartoon Wars Part I", "Cartoon Wars Part II", "200", "201", and "Band in China".

- "Cartoon Wars Part II": Cartman wishes the President a major news corporation to prevent an episode of Family Guy from airing, and to prevent Kyle from interfering with his plan, Cartman states, "okay, I'll make it easy for you", and pulls out a gun and aims it at the President. When the President responds with, "okay, I'll listen to you", Kyle states to the President, "you can't do what he wants just because he's the one threatening you with violence!" When the president then responds with, "I can't be responsible for people getting hurt. Especially me", Kyle states, "yes, people can get hurt. That's how terrorism works. But if you give into that... you're allowing terrorism to work. Do the right thing here".

=== Drugs ===
- "Ike's Wee Wee": Mr. Mackey is forced out of his job for losing a marijuana bud in a drug-education class. Ironically, he goes through a cycle of experimentation (ending up in his adopting hippie ideology and happily marrying a woman he meets), before an enforced treatment (after being captured during his honeymoon in India by the A-Team, no less) and reverting to his position as a spokesman against drugs.
- "My Future Self n' Me": Stan and Butters' parents find an indirect and strange way to try to prevent their children from using drugs. They hire representatives to act as though they were future versions of the children, who travel back in time to tell them how the use of drugs has made their lives miserable. While the episode does condemn the use of drugs, it parodies the tendency of people (especially parents) to overreact to the substances and deceive their children to ensure their safety.
- "Towelie" and "A Million Little Fibers": Towelie is forced to confront his marijuana addiction in times of crisis, eventually coming to the "conclusion" that he should only partake in drug use when he accomplishes something good, not in order to.
  - Towelie later puts his marijuana addiction to good use as he is a state government inspector that approves and later works at Randy Marsh's marijuana farm in Season 22.
- "Up the Down Steroid": Jimmy Valmer is chronicled through his use of steroids; combines the subject of performance-enhancing drug controversy frequently seen in baseball and other sports with a Lifestories: Families in Crisis episode about steroid use.
- "Die Hippie, Die": The hippies have their Jamfest in South Park to "Stop Corporations" and Kenny, Kyle and Stan join the hippies. In the end, the boys realize the hippies smoke way too much pot and are just as selfish as the corporations they complain about by trying to forget about their troubles when they don't have any.
- "Major Boobage": Kids across the nation, particularly Kenny, have found a new way to get high. The episode references the glue-sniffing, paint snorting, and marker sniffing epidemics.
- "Quest for Ratings" To get ideas for South Park Elementary's closed-circuit television system, the boys decide to get high on cough medicine. Remembering that they had seen Craig's program while high and thought it to be brilliant, they conclude that a majority of the school must be perpetually high on cough medicine, accounting for his ratings. They then decide to produce a special report that gets cough medicine banned from school.
- "Medicinal Fried Chicken": Medical marijuana becomes legal while KFC is portrayed as a newly illegal addictive drug, featuring a Cartman subplot that parodies the film Scarface.
- "Best Friends Forever": An archangel presenting a battle strategy to Kenny on a whiteboard while casually sniffing the marker he's using.
- "Guitar Queer-O": Stan plays a video game called "Heroin Hero", in which the only objective was to shoot up heroin and chase a dragon around.
- "Hummels & Heroin": When a number of costumed characters begin to overdose on painkillers at children's birthday parties, Stan discovers that the drugs are being trafficked out of Grandpa Marsh's nursing home, stored inside German Hummels. The episode parodies the growing opioid epidemic, while also comparing retirement homes to prisons.
- "Tegridy Farms": Randy and Sharon move out to a cannabis farm, where he harvests the plant and manufactures a variety of products from hemp.

=== Environmentalism and global warming ===
- "Rainforest Shmainforest" parodies environmental activism and portrays celebrity environmental activism as motivated by a desire to feel better about themselves.
- "Spontaneous Combustion" uses global warming as a source of trouble for the townspeople, caused by their own flatulence.
- "Two Days Before the Day After Tomorrow" and "ManBearPig" make fun of overreactions and doomsday predictions concerning global warming. "Two Days..." also mocks the government's response in the aftermath of Hurricane Katrina, while "ManBearPig" is more specifically a mockery of Al Gore.
- "Smug Alert!": Hybrid automobiles, while praised, nonetheless have owners who are touted as a source of "smug" (caused by the incredible selfish and self-centered behavior of their owners); San Francisco is considered as the "smug" capital, destroyed in a "smug-storm" à la The Perfect Storm. The "smug-storm" was represented by an Oscar Acceptance speech given by George Clooney a few weeks before the episode originally aired.
- In "Terrance and Phillip: Behind the Blow" Earth Day people come to South Park. The Earth Day people utilize a Jedi mind trick to make the townspeople not only believe that all they say is correct, while that which conservatives say is slander, but to also build for them a massive Earth Day celebration. When Stan says "My dad is a geologist and he says there actually isn't any concrete evidence of global warming", they answer "That's not true, global warming is going to kill us all. The Republicans are responsible".
- In "Time to Get Cereal" and "Nobody Got Cereal?", after ManBearPig comes to South Park and goes on a murderous rampage, the boys seek out Al Gore to help stop him. ManBearPig serves as a metaphor for the devastating effects of climate change, while the town's indifferent reaction parodies the views of climate change deniers. Some critics have suggested that Parker and Stone made the episodes as an "apology" to Gore for mocking him in the past.
- "Whale Whores" addresses the subject matter of Japanese whaling.

=== Homosexuality and same-sex marriage ===
- Big Gay Al is used in several episodes and the movie to promote tolerance and acceptance for homosexuals.
- Mr. Garrison later comes out as gay for several seasons, and lives with Mr. Slave until he undergoes a sex change operation in "Mr. Garrison's Fancy New Vagina". After the sex change, "Mrs. Garrison" briefly becomes a lesbian in "D-Yikes!".
- Big Gay Al and Mr. Slave are later married in "Follow That Egg!". South Park parodies the real-life "civil union" compromise by proposing gay couples be allowed to have the same rights as married groups, but be called "butt buddies".
- The 2007 episode "Cartman Sucks" parodied and criticized the ex-gay movement, focusing on children whose parents force them to attend conversion therapy.
- Stan's dog 'Sparky', who is voiced by George Clooney, is gay, and humps other male dogs in "Big Gay Al's Big Gay Boat Ride".
- In "The F Word", the word fag is used quite satirically to reference middle-aged men who ride Harley-Davidsons and even the homosexuals petition for the word's definition to be changed from meaning homosexuals to middle-aged bikies.
- In "Trapped In the Closet", many references are made about the rumors of Tom Cruise being gay. He locks himself in Stan's bedroom closet and the characters say "Tom Cruise won't come out of the closet." John Travolta and R. Kelly also join in.
- The Tom Cruise homosexuality joke continued in the Season 14 episode "200" where Tom Cruise was working in a fudge factory putting them in packages. Stan sees and refers to him as a "fudge packer" which then makes Tom Cruise outraged and threatens to sue the town of South Park with numerous celebrities who have been mocked by the show.

=== Literature ===
- In "Chickenlover", Officer Barbrady is forced to confront his illiteracy while attempting to solve the case of the "chickenlover", a man who goes around having sex with local chickens. In the end, it's revealed that the "chickenlover" is the owner of a local bookmobile, whose motive was to help Barbrady learn to read by leaving clues in book passages. He gives him a copy of Atlas Shrugged by Ayn Rand, which Barbrady reads and decries, "I read every last word of this garbage and because of this piece of SHIT, I'm never reading again!"
- In "A Ladder to Heaven", kittylitter is a collection of books.
- In "Timmy 2000", a doctor diagnoses Timmy and the other children with ADD by reading them the novels The Great Gatsby and A Farewell to Arms in their entirety, then asking them a trivial question about a single passage; he deduces from their unresponsive boredom that they weren't paying attention and prescribes them all Ritalin.
- In "Pip", the book Great Expectations is parodied throughout. British actor Malcolm McDowell provides narration.
- In "Mystery of the Urinal Deuce", cases are solved by the "Hardly Boys", a direct parody of The Hardy Boys.
- In "The Tale of Scrotie McBoogerballs", books that (allegedly) cause the death of a major celebrity are often barred from sale, explicitly referencing the supposed role of The Catcher in the Rye in the shootings of John Lennon and Ronald Reagan. It is also a fact that if an author finds success, people will always assume that the written work contains hidden meanings.
- In "Over Logging", internet access "dries up" for people across the Midwest, so Randy decides to move his family "out Californee way" in search of more. The episode is a parody of John Steinbeck's novel The Grapes of Wrath and its film adaptation.
- In “D-Yikes!”, the boys hire Mexican day laborers to read The Old Man and the Sea and write book reports for them. The Mexicans misunderstand the request to write four “essays” and instead write letters to their éses.
- Every author is obsessed with receiving approval from Oprah, especially Towelie. The episode "A Million Little Fibers" spoofs the controversy surrounding author James Frey after his memoir A Million Little Pieces was lauded on The Oprah Winfrey Show and selected for Oprah's Book Club, only to later be discovered that it was largely fictionalized.

=== Religion ===
- "Starvin' Marvin in Space": Christian missionaries and Pat Robertson attempt to cajole Starvin Marvin's people and the Marklar into accepting their faith. This episode in general portrays missionaries in a rather unfavorable manner, as when the missionary character attempts to get the Africans to read the Bible. "Remember, reading the Bible plus accepting Jesus equals FOOD", suggesting that the Christians would have let the emaciated Africans starve if they did not convert.
- "Are You There God? It's Me, Jesus" addresses the Year 2000 hype/hysteria and introduces God (in a non-stereotypical visage) to the series.
- "Super Best Friends" has the key members of the world's faiths join together to fight a cult.
- Christian rock music is the subject of "Christian Rock Hard": Cartman attempts to start a Christian Rock band as a scheme to win a bet with Kyle.
- "Red Hot Catholic Love" parodies the Catholic sex abuse scandal (the town's pastor is seen trying to convert other Catholic priests from molestation) and the separation of church and state as demanded by atheists; the issue of sex abuse was lampooned again in "A Boy and a Priest", which came in the wake of renewed scrutiny of the Church following an extensive Pennsylvania grand jury report. In the latter episode, the archdiocese in Denver sends three priests to South Park in order to clean up Father Mackie's mess when he is only having a non-sexual relationship with Butters. The episode involves the pastor becoming the butt of jokes by the townspeople.
- Cartman Sucks features Butters' stay in a Christian conversion therapy camp, where he, completely oblivious to the euphemisms used to designate homosexuality ("confusion", "bi-curious"), witnesses suicides and the psychological pressure applied on homosexual children. The episode ends with Butters realizing that "If I'm bi-curious and I'm made from God, then I think your God must be a little bi-curious too."
- "All About the Mormons?" chronicles the arrival of a Mormon family in South Park, and lampoons the story of Joseph Smith. Yet in conclusion to the episode, Gary, Stan's Mormon friend, tells Stan, "Look, maybe us Mormons do believe in crazy stories that make absolutely no sense, and maybe Joseph Smith did make it all up, but I have a great life. and a great family, and I have the Book of Mormon to thank for that. The truth is, I don't care if Joseph Smith made it all up, because what the church teaches now is loving your family, being nice and helping people. And even though people in this town might think that's stupid, I still choose to believe in it. All I ever did was try to be your friend, Stan, but you're so high and mighty you couldn't look past my religion and just be my friend back. You've got a lot of growing up to do, buddy. Suck my balls".
- "Bloody Mary" was criticized for its portrayal of a Virgin Mary statue as bleeding from her anus (later found out to be from her vagina, as declared by Pope Benedict XVI in the episode). It also addressed the religious origins of Alcoholics Anonymous.
- "Do the Handicapped Go to Hell?" and "Probably" depicts Stan, Cartman, and Kenny being frightened by the town Priest's descriptions of hell and those who are headed there. Determined to save their souls and those of their friends, including Kyle, a Jew and Timmy, who is mentally handicapped, they seek out advice from the local clergy. When the boys find the priest having sex in the confessional, they decide to make their own church aimed at salvation. They continue this course until it is revealed that Cartman, in an obvious nod to televangelism, only did it to make ten million dollars, and Jesus shows up to bring an end to Cartman's prosperity gospel church. The episode pokes fun at charismatic evangelicals.
- Scientology is the subject of "Trapped in the Closet" where Stan is declared the reincarnation of L. Ron Hubbard.
- "Go God Go" and sequel, "Go God Go XII" attempt to show that atheism can be just as radical as religion. In the future, all religion has been destroyed by Richard Dawkins and Mrs. Garrison and everyone is atheist in hopes that reason will prevent war. However, fanaticism nonetheless grows and there are several warring factions trying to decide whose logic is correct in determining their name. They also use 'Science' as an alternative to 'God' as a curse, e.g. 'Science Damn You', 'Science H Logic!'.
- In "Fantastic Easter Special", the episode suggested (lampooning The Da Vinci Code) that Saint Peter was a rabbit and that God wanted all the popes to be rabbits so they would keep their mouths shut. It also villainizes Bill Donohue, the controversial leader of the Catholic League, who previously criticized the show after the "Bloody Mary" episode.
- "Canada on Strike": A husband and wife driving are witness to Ike holding a sign: "Honk if you support Canada", the husband honks twice, and upon his wife confirming to him "Oh, we're supporting unions" he states to her "That's right; we're a very progressive couple", and later "Well we've done our good deed for the week. I think now I can make love to your anus without making God angry".
- "Imaginationland Episode III": Within a plead to US generals not to "nuke our imagination" despite it having gone wild in the Pentagon's Operation Imagination Doorway, Kyle states that "I mean, whether Jesus is real or not, he... he's had a bigger impact on the world than any of us have. And the same could be said of Bugs Bunny and, a-and Superman and Harry Potter. They've changed my life, changed the way I act on the Earth. Doesn't that make them kind of 'real'. They might be imaginary, but, but they're more important than most of us here. And they're all gonna be around long after we're dead. So in a way, those things are more realer than any of us"
- "Ginger Cow": Cartman's prank, dressing a cow as a "ginger", fools Christians, Jews, and Muslims into thinking it is a doomsday prophecy. They gather in Jerusalem where their respective symbols (the Cross, Star of David, and Star and crescent) are morphed into one, the symbol of Van Halen, ushering in 10 years of peace, harmony, and rock music. Meanwhile, Cartman blackmails Kyle to hide the truth to keep the peace going. The episode references the red heifer, which is mentioned in all three religions.

=== Politics ===
- A subplot in "Trapper Keeper" features the kindergarten class voting for Class President, pitting Ike against his classmate, Filmore. The count repeatedly ends in a tie as a single student named Flora, remains undecided. Filmore's aunt, Rosie O'Donnell, demands a recount and calls in a team of lawyers to contest the election. The episode satirizes the 2000 U.S. presidential election, especially legal disputes over the recount in Florida and the eventual Supreme Court decision.
- "Douche and Turd": the school votes for a new mascot, and P. Diddy terrorizes the cast into voting; satire on the 2004 U.S. presidential election. This episode essentially depicts the Democratic Party and the Republican Party as being not particularly desirable (a douche and a turd sandwich). When Stan points out that there isn't any point in voting if the only options are a douche and a turd, at the end it is pointed out that most elections that will ever occur will be between a douche and a turd.
- The concept of political correctness is criticized in "Mr. Hankey, the Christmas Poo", "Chef Goes Nanners", "Cartman's Silly Hate Crime 2000", and virtually the entire nineteenth season, where it served as a central theme and introduced a new character, PC Principal.
- In "About Last Night...", Barack Obama wins the 2008 presidential election as South Park and the rest of the country are divided on the outcome: liberals (including Randy) are drunkenly partying and rioting in the streets, while conservatives (led by the Stotches) are terrified that the Apocalypse is at hand. Meanwhile, it's revealed that Obama and John McCain are the leaders of a crew of jewel thieves, who use people's distraction to steal the Hope Diamond from the Smithsonian (a parody of both Ocean's Eleven and Entrapment). The episode notably aired the night after the election and included portions of Obama's victory speech in its opening. It remarks on the absurdity of people who become overly invested in the outcome of elections.
- The first episode of the seventeenth season, "Let Go, Let Gov", satirizes the 2013 mass surveillance disclosures in which Cartman infiltrates the NSA and eventually becomes a whistleblower, similar to Edward Snowden.
- The sixth episode of the eighth season, "Goobacks", deals with illegal immigration and asylum-seekers.
- In "Obama Wins!," Cartman manages to steal ballots in the 2012 presidential election swing states of Florida, Ohio, North Carolina, Nevada, and Colorado in an attempt to ensure that Barack Obama wins the election and Cartman gets a part in the next Star Wars movie. Also, China is discovered as making a deal with President Obama. (Mitt Romney won North Carolina in real life. This means that Obama would have won reelection even with the ballots Cartman stole as the President had the 270 needed to secure reelection.)
- The 2016 election serves as a central theme for season 20, with Mr. Garrison running for president and assuming a Trump like persona for the remainder of his presidency. Garrison chooses Caitlyn Jenner as his running mate and runs a xenophobic, anti-Canadian campaign, pledging to “build a wall” between Canada and the United States. This eventually leads him to call a nuclear strike on Toronto near the end of season 21.

=== War ===
- In "Terrance and Phillip in Not Without My Anus" and onward, Saddam tries to take over Canada, becomes Satan's lover in Bigger, Longer & Uncut, in future episodes is caught trying to manufacture weapons of mass destruction in Heaven, and is eventually captured in "It's Christmas in Canada" (after the real-life one was captured in Iraq).
- The U.S. invasion of Afghanistan and the September 11 attacks are used as backgrounds for "Osama bin Laden Has Farty Pants".
- The Iraq War is also premised or discussed in "Red Sleigh Down".
- In "I'm a Little Bit Country", war protesters are portrayed as needing the war supporters so that the United States would not become weak and unable to defend itself from attack, while war supporters are shown as needing the war protesters so the U.S. would not seem like a power hungry or tyrannical government. The theory was discovered by Cartman (in a flashback) to have originated from the founding fathers, who referred to it as "having your cake and eating it too".
- "Mystery of the Urinal Deuce" discusses and parodies many of the 9/11 conspiracy theories, which are shown as being created by the government in an effort to appear to have power over the events.
- "Reverse Cowgirl" has a parody of the TSA which is created when Clyde's Mom dies because somebody left the toilet seat up.

=== Other ===
- "Conjoined Fetus Lady" and "Timmy 2000" address the acceptance of people with disabilities.
- "Proper Condom Use" addresses the teaching of sexual education in schools with a Mad Max 2-esque storyline.
- "Sexual Harassment Panda" addresses frivolous lawsuits – especially those against public institutions.
- "Here Comes the Neighborhood" lampoons Class hate with allusions to racism by pitting townspeople who happen be white against "richers" who happen be black.
- "Gnomes" addresses corporate take over of small businesses, and makes the point that America was founded on free enterprise and capitalism.
- "Best Friends Forever" satirizes the final days of the Terri Schiavo case and the debate over right to die. Schiavo died on March 31, 2005, the day after the episode initially aired.
- "Mr. Garrison's Fancy New Vagina" has a subplot about Kyle and his father having both self and body image problems with themselves not being perfect. They refuse to accept their physical appearance (Kyle not being tall black and Gerald not being and wanting to be a dolphin) and they used cosmetic surgery to "help" the problem.
- "Night of the Living Homeless" addresses homelessness with a storyline similar to George A. Romero's Living Dead series.
- "Tonsil Trouble" has a subplot about Cartman having HIV and Kyle laughing at Cartman for having it and Cartman infecting Kyle with HIV and they turn to Magic Johnson for help, It also addresses the using of HIV positive jokes.
- "Butters' Bottom Bitch" points out the social disadvantages to prostitution being illegal, and proposes an alternate system wherein prostitutes need not suffer abuse and instead receive housing and health care.
- "Crack Baby Athletic Association" addresses the disparity between the profitability of college sports, particularly basketball, and the lack of compensation for student athletes.
- "The Hobbit" also addresses body and self-image issues as well as the views of a world with programs like Photoshop.
- "You Have 0 Friends" addressed the matter of Facebook and social isolation.
- "Cock Magic" deals with the issue of Illegal gambling, Cockfighting in particular.
- "Le Petit Tourette" deals with the issue of Tourette syndrome.
- "W.T.F." parodies several aspects of professional wrestling, highlighting the sport's emphasis on such theatrical elements as costumes, back stories and scripted storylines.
- "PC Principal Final Justice" features a subplot that lampoons America's pervasive gun culture.
- "Dead Kids" addresses the frequency of school shootings in the United States and the American public's growing desensitization to mass shootings in general.
- "The Pandemic Special" tackles a wide range of issues related to the COVID-19 pandemic including: the economic impact, the United States' response, racial unrest, police brutality, mental health, improper mask wearing, education, Sinophobia, and the movement to Defund the police.
- South ParQ Vaccination Special covers the debates over the rollout of the vaccine in the US and the QAnon movement.
- South Park: Post Covid: The Return of Covid addresses the debate over NFTs, portraying it as a big pyramid scheme, with Butters in his new identity as "Victor Chaos" making loads of money by convincing others to buy NFTs.
- "Pajama Day" parodies the fights over mask-wearing during the COVID-19 pandemic by replacing masks with pajamas.
