= Council of Nine =

Council of Nine can refer to:

- Council of Nine, the council that governs the Church of Satan
- "Council of Nine" of Imaginationland, in the "Imaginationland Episode II" of South Park
- "Council of Nine", the highest authority of The Traditions in the role-playing game Mage: the Ascension
- Council of Nine, a secret criminal organization in the second season of Agent Carter, based on the Secret Empire organization from Marvel Comics.
