= Lice Capades =

- South Park episode
- Episode no.: Season 11; Episode 3
- Directed by: Trey Parker
- Written by: Trey Parker
- Production code: 1103
- Original air date: March 21, 2007

Episode chronology
← Previous "Cartman Sucks"	Next → "The Snuke"
- South Park season 11

"Lice Capades" is the third episode of the eleventh season of the American animated television series South Park. The 156th episode of the series overall, it first aired on Comedy Central in the United States on March 21, 2007. In the episode, Clyde discovers that he has head lice and tries to hide it from his classmates, knowing they will make fun of him. The episode was written and directed by series co-creator Trey Parker.

== Plot ==
Mrs. Garrison announces to the class that every student must be checked for head lice. During the check, Clyde is informed that he has head lice, much to his horror. The nurse gives him a note and he goes to the doctor, who prescribes Clyde a lice shampoo, but Clyde lies about the situation, knowing the other kids will bully him. Meanwhile, from on top of Clyde's head, the lice are living peacefully in a village until one of them, Travis, witnesses the nurse parting Clyde's hair and sees her as a gigantic eye. Travis tells the other lice the "world" has become aware of them and is angry, that they need to move away, but he is ridiculed. That night, Clyde washes his hair with the shampoo and dries it off with the hair dryer, killing most of the lice. Travis's wife Kelly is killed, but Travis, their unborn baby Hope, and a handful of other lice, including the villainous vice president, Greg, survive.

The next day in class, Mrs. Garrison tells the children that someone had lice but refuses to reveal who. The kids suspect each other and plot to discover who had the lice to avoid and humiliate them. Cartman devises a test to tell who has head lice (a parody of the blood test in the 1982 horror film The Thing), and rigs it to frame Kenny, who flees.

Back on Clyde's head, while other lice stay behind to find survivors, Travis (carrying Hope), Greg, and another survivor seek a better world at the "Forbidden Zone". There, Greg fatally shoots the other survivor and wounds Travis, telling him he will rebuild the village and finally become President. Greg mocks Travis's theories of a living world that is conscious and shoots the "ground" several times, stating that if the world was indeed alive it would react. In that moment Clyde reaches up to the back of his neck, tossing Greg away and sends him falling to his death.

The boys track Kenny down to the park, where they intend to punish him, each carrying a bar of soap in a sock as their weapon. They invite Clyde to come. Before Clyde leaves, filled with guilt, he calls Mrs. Garrison to warn her of Kenny's danger. Kenny is caught in the park, stripped to his underwear and given what Cartman calls a "sock bath" (i.e. washed with the soap, then dried with the socks). Kyle says he cannot let Kenny take the fall for him, and admits that he had lice. Stan and Cartman admit to the same thing; Mrs. Garrison shows up and tells the boys that everyone in the class had head lice, as it spreads quickly. The boys nevertheless proceed with the sock bath for Kenny's denial.

Travis, near death, sees an apparition of Kelly in the sky flying towards him like an 'angel' (a soprano in the music score sings "Pie Jesu" from Fauré's "Requiem"). The apparition is a housefly, and Travis, still tightly holding Hope, grabs on to one of its legs before it flies off. The fly lands on another world/body and Travis is welcomed by larger, red-brown-colored lice at a well-established city; he is told they have lived in peace for generations. The shot zooms out from the 'trees' and reveals the city to be on the pubic area of Angelina Jolie.

== Reception ==
IGN rated this episode 7.5 out of 10: "South Park often parodies the overblown drama found in Hollywood blockbuster movies, and this is [sic] episode is a disaster parody of sorts...It seems like the episode had larger ambitions, but becomes bogged down in the parody bit with the lice." For the week of March 19 to March 25, 2007, this episode of South Park was the 13th-most-watched cable program, with 3.1 million viewers.
