= Shane Company =

Online jewelry retailer of the United States

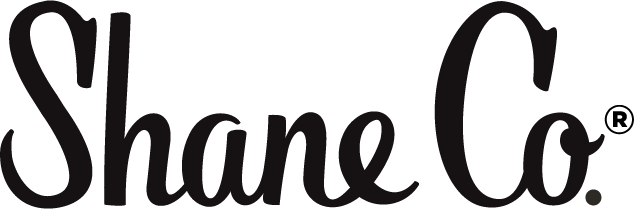
- Type: Private
- Industry: Specialty retail
- Founded: 1971
- Founder: Tom Shane
- Headquarters: Denver, Colorado, U.S.
- Key people: Tom Shane (Founder), Rordan Shane (CEO)
- Revenue: ▼US$ 210 million (2008)
- Number of employees: 850 (2026)
- Website: www.shaneco.com

Shane Company or Shane Co. is the largest privately owned jeweler in the United States. The company is a direct diamond, ruby, and sapphire importer that operates 22 retail stores across the United States, as well as their website, ShaneCo.com. The company was founded in 1971, and is based in Denver, Colorado.

The company is most known through their radio commercials that prominently featured the company’s founder Tom Shane and their old tagline "Now you have a friend in the jewelry business." Tom's son, Roran Shane, has now taken over the title of CEO, and the brand has updated its tagline to "Your Friend & Jeweler." Showcasing their commitment to on-site expert jewelers, with jewelry crafted with care, a free All-Inclusive Lifetime Warranty, and Exceptional Customer Service.

== History ==
Tom Shane graduated from the University of Colorado in 1970 with a degree in business administration. In 1971, he founded modern-day Shane Company, although his family has been in the jewelry business since the Great Depression. His grandfather, Charles Shane, launched the family into the jewelry business in 1929 when he purchased his first jewelry store in Cleveland, Ohio. Richard Shane, Tom Shane's father, joined his father and brother, Claude Shane, in the business after World War II. Several years afterward, Richard and Claude split their business interests into two large jewelry chains in the Midwest, opening the first stores with the name Shane Company. Throughout the following decades, Tom Shane grew Shane Co. from a one-store operation into a jewelry store chain with 22 locations in 13 states.

=== Bankruptcy ===
Shane Company filed for Chapter 11 bankruptcy on January 12, 2009 and closed three locations in Orlando, Florida; and Morrow, Georgia, and Tukwila, Washington, on February 15, 2009. Tukwila reopened in a new location as of November 2023.|

On August 11, 2010, Shane Co. filed a Plan of Reorganization to repay 100% of all debts, placing debts to Tom Shane as the lowest priority. The bankruptcy judge called it "the ideal Chapter 11". On December 21, 2010, Shane Co. emerged from Chapter 11 bankruptcy protection.

== In popular culture ==
Tom Shane was depicted in an episode of South Park. The episode, titled "Guitar Queer-o", originally aired on November 7, 2007. He was portrayed at a party among notable local Colorado celebrities such as Jake Jabs from American Furniture Warehouse, and Jay Cutler, former quarterback of the Denver Broncos.

Shane Co. is known for their radio advertisements. A typical radio advertisement will contain a marketing message and the often quoted culmination of the spot, the company’s tagline, “Now you have a friend in the diamond business.”

The company has aggressively defended the tagline. The tagline and Tom Shane's delivery have been the subject of humor; the Atlanta Business Chronicle noted, "the ads have all the flash and flare of a public service announcement", remarking on his "relentlessly earnest tone". The San Francisco Chronicle said, "for the past 35 years, Shane has bored radio listeners with his earnest, monotone delivery". The company states the radio advertisements are the longest-running continuous campaign in the history of the medium of radio. The commercials were freshened up with the help of the Grey Global Group advertising agency, which used the tagline "He might be dull, but he's brilliant" in 2006. The commercials remain a cornerstone of the company's advertising efforts to this day.
