= South Park season 11 =

Season of television series

South Park
- Season 11
- Home media release cover
- No. of episodes: 14

Release
- Original network: Comedy Central
- Original release: March 7 – November 14, 2007

Season chronology
- ← Previous; Season 10 Next → Season 12

The eleventh season of South Park, an American animated television series created by Trey Parker and Matt Stone, began airing on March 7, 2007. The 11th season concluded after 14 episodes on November 14, 2007. This is the first season to have uncensored episodes available for DVD release. This is also the season featuring the three-part, Emmy Award-winning episode "Imaginationland" (which was released separately on DVD with scenes not shown in the televised version before being packaged with the rest of the season 11 episodes as part of the complete season DVD). Parker was the director and writer of this eleventh season. Imaginationland: The Movie was released in 2008, which compiled the three episodes into a standalone film.

== Episodes ==
No. overall	No. in season	Title	Directed by	Written by	Original release date	Prod. code	U.S. viewers (millions)
154	1	"With Apologies to Jesse Jackson"	Trey Parker	Trey Parker	March 7, 2007	1101	2.77
Randy Marsh becomes a social pariah after saying "niggers" on Wheel of Fortune, which leads to tensions between Token and Stan. Meanwhile, Cartman and his typical views anger Dr. David Nelson, a dwarf who comes to give a speech at the school.
155	2	"Cartman Sucks"	Trey Parker	Trey Parker	March 14, 2007	1102	2.75
Butters is sent to a religious camp for sexually confused children after his father catches him in a compromising position with Cartman.
156	3	"Lice Capades"	Trey Parker	Trey Parker	March 21, 2007	1103	3.06
An infestation of head lice plagues South Park Elementary, and Cartman spearheads a campaign to find out who has lice so they can make fun of the unfortunate kid. The lice in Clyde's head try to escape when most of their kind are killed by lice shampoo.
157	4	"The Snuke"	Trey Parker	Trey Parker	March 28, 2007	1104	3.17
Hillary Clinton is in town for a big campaign rally, and discovers that her vagina has been rigged with a bomb. Cartman suspects a new Muslim kid at school might be responsible for the bomb planted.
158	5	"Fantastic Easter Special"	Trey Parker	Trey Parker	April 4, 2007	1105	2.95
Determined to get the real story behind why eggs are decorated for Easter, Stan ends up involved with an eccentric society that guards a legendary secret.
159	6	"D-Yikes!"	Trey Parker	Trey Parker	April 11, 2007	1106	2.82
In a parody of 300, Mrs. Garrison falls for a woman at a lesbian bar and fights Persians to keep the bar from being renovated. Meanwhile, Stan, Kyle, Cartman, and Kenny hire illegal immigrants to do their homework for them.
160	7	"Night of the Living Homeless"	Trey Parker	Trey Parker	April 18, 2007	1107	3.11
Masses of homeless people invade South Park. The parents of South Park are trapped on a rooftop, while the children trace the cause of the epidemic.
161	8	"Le Petit Tourette"	Trey Parker	Trey Parker	October 3, 2007	1108	3.32
Cartman pretends to have Tourette syndrome so he can say whatever he wants without being punished, but faking the condition begins to wear on his mental filter.
162	9	"More Crap"	Trey Parker	Trey Parker	October 10, 2007	1109	2.98
Randy becomes South Park's hometown hero when the guys down at the local bar see the size of his most recent feces.
163	10	"Imaginationland Episode I"	Trey Parker	Trey Parker	October 17, 2007	1110	3.43
Cartman makes a bet with Kyle that if leprechauns are real, Kyle will suck Cartman's balls. Cartman wins, and Kyle is stuck in a dilemma. The aforementioned leprechaun leads the kids to Imaginationland, but it gets attacked by terrorists in attempt to take over peoples' imagination and Butters gets caught in the mix.
164	11	"Imaginationland Episode II"	Trey Parker	Trey Parker	October 24, 2007	1111	3.60
Stan and Kyle are being held in the Pentagon until they tell the government how they got into Imaginationland. Meanwhile, Cartman goes to great lengths to get Kyle to suck his balls after the leprechaun bet.
165	12	"Imaginationland Episode III"	Trey Parker	Trey Parker	October 31, 2007	1112	3.87
Inside Imaginationland, Stan and Butters engage in the battle of their lives as they fight the army of evil imaginary forces alongside what's left of the good imaginary people led by Aslan. Kyle tries to save Stan and Butters from Imaginationland, and Cartman once again goes to great lengths to get Kyle to suck his balls.
166	13	"Guitar Queer-O"	Trey Parker	Trey Parker	November 7, 2007	1113	3.97
Stan and Kyle are both hooked on Guitar Hero, which drives a wedge in their friendship.
167	14	"The List"	Trey Parker	Trey Parker	November 14, 2007	1114	3.77
The girls in the fourth grade class make a secret list that rates every boy's looks from cutest to ugliest. The fourth grade boys discover this and steal the list. They are, however, unprepared to deal with the results. Stan and Wendy reconcile after their break up while trying to solve the list mystery.

== See also ==
- South Park (Park County, Colorado)
- South Park City
