= With Apologies to Jesse Jackson =

- South Park episode
- Episode no.: Season 11; Episode 1
- Directed by: Trey Parker
- Written by: Trey Parker
- Production code: 1101
- Original air date: March 7, 2007

Episode chronology
← Previous "Stanley's Cup"	Next → "Cartman Sucks"
- South Park season 11

"With Apologies to Jesse Jackson" is the first episode of the eleventh season of the American animated television series South Park. The 154th overall episode of the series, it first aired on Comedy Central in the United States on March 7, 2007, and was rated TV-MA-L. In the episode, Randy Marsh says the word "niggers" on the real-life game show Wheel of Fortune, leading to widespread public outrage. Randy's son, Stan, attempts to understand the epithet's impact on his black friend Token Black. Meanwhile, a man with dwarfism has a hard time trying to teach Eric Cartman to be sensitive.

Parker and Stone had long wanted to create an episode exploring the racial slur, but struggled with a plot line beyond its opening scene. They subsequently found it easier to work on following comedian Michael Richards' controversy, in which he screamed the slur at hecklers.

Despite the uncensored frequent usage of the racial slur, the episode attracted very little media attention. Parents Television Council founder L. Brent Bozell III criticized the lack of protest against the episode. The episode was critically acclaimed by contemporary television critics, who praised the episode's humor and storyline. According to Nielsen Media Research, the episode was seen by 2.8 million viewers the week it was broadcast. "With Apologies to Jesse Jackson" was released on DVD along with the rest of the eleventh season on August 12, 2008.

== Plot ==
Randy Marsh is on Wheel of Fortune and has made it to the bonus round. The episode is airing live, with his family watching him from the audience and the South Park residents watching from home. Randy has to solve a puzzle in the category "People Who Annoy You". He is given the letters R, T, S, L, and E before asking for the letters B, N, G, and O, after which the puzzle spells "N▢GGERS". Randy has 10 seconds to solve the puzzle, but is hesitant to say what he thinks is the answer, not sure if it is appropriate. However, after Pat Sajak tells Randy he has five seconds, Randy answers "niggers", which shocks everyone; the correct answer is then revealed to be "naggers".

At school the next day, Cartman tells Stan that the event was "the funniest thing" he ever saw and that Token will be mad at Stan for Randy's actions. Stan goes to Token to try and explain by saying that his father is not a racist but is just "stupid". Cartman, seeing an opportunity to incite conflict, tries to get the two into a "race war". Instead of fighting, Token criticizes Stan for his lack of understanding how it feels to hear the slur and walks away. Cartman sees this as forfeit and runs away screaming: "Whites win!"

Seeking forgiveness, Randy visits Jesse Jackson to apologize. Jackson bends over his desk and tells Randy to apologize by kissing his buttocks. Randy does so and a picture is taken, which is then put into the news. Stan seeks out Token, expecting everything to be better now since his dad apologized, yet Token is still mad, retorting, "Jesse Jackson is not the emperor of black people!", to which Stan replies, "He told my dad he was…"

In light of recent events, the school brings in a dwarf author, Dr. David Nelson, who travels to schools nationwide with sensitivity seminars. However, as soon as Nelson walks onstage, Cartman bursts into hysterical laughter. At first, Nelson believes that Cartman will eventually stop laughing, but realizes that he has no chance to talk, even after Mr. Mackey shouts at Cartman to be quiet.

Randy goes to Laugh Factory, where he is singled out by black comedian Coyote Brown (who resembles Chris Rock), who calls Randy a "Nigger-Guy". Thereafter, the denizens of South Park use the name against Randy, making him feel like an outcast. Back at school, Nelson discusses Cartman with Principal Victoria and Mr. Mackey, and asks to meet with him. When Cartman arrives, all he can do is continue to laugh and heckle at Nelson. Nelson tries to insist that Cartman's words do not hurt him, but as Cartman laughs, Nelson loses his temper and yells at Cartman. This shocks Mackey and Victoria, in contrast to their prior indifference over Cartman's treatment of Nelson.

Stan once again confronts Token, but this time to say he understands how Token feels about the N-word after Nelson spoke at the assembly. Token rebukes Stan, saying that he still does not understand. After this, Nelson calls all of the students to the gymnasium to teach Cartman a lesson by making fun of his obesity with the words "Hello, fatso!" when Cartman walks in so he understands how it feels. They do this, and Cartman responds angrily, but when Nelson comes out to scold him, Cartman breaks out in laughter yet again.

Meanwhile, in further attempts to repair his reputation, Randy starts the Randy Marsh African American Scholarship Foundation. When walking away from the grand opening, he is chased by a trio of socially progressive, shotgun-wielding rednecks who are angry at him for slandering an entire race of people. However, other "Nigger-Guys", led by Seinfeld alumnus Michael Richards and including former Los Angeles investigator Mark Fuhrman, rescue him and scare the rednecks off. Richards introduces Randy to other Nigger-Guys and accepts him into their ranks.

Stan gets fed up with Token and demands to know why he is still mad. The two are interrupted by Butters, who tells them that Cartman is going to fight Nelson in the town park, and the three run off to spectate. Before the fight, Kyle warns Cartman that Nelson is a karate black belt. Nelson announces his intention to beat Cartman to prove his point, and the two begin wrestling, where Cartman easily gains the upper hand. Later, in Washington D.C., the "Nigger-Guys" are pleading their case to the Senate to ban the term "Nigger-Guy". A law is passed by the Senate whereby anyone saying the words "nigger" and "guy" within seven words of each other shall be prosecuted and fined.

Back in South Park, Nelson forfeits to Cartman, but as Cartman gloats, Nelson rises and kicks Cartman to the ground. However, Cartman remains unfazed and continues to laugh. An angered Nelson departs, saying he proved his point, which the students have long forgotten. It is then that Stan understands that he does not get it and never will because he is not black. Stan admits his inability to understand to Token, which was what he was looking to hear all along, and they reconcile.

== Production ==
"With Apologies to Jesse Jackson" was the season premiere of South Park's eleventh season, and the first episode of the show's spring 2007 run, which consists of seven episodes. Parker and Stone had wanted to create an episode centered on the racial slur "nigger" for a considerable time. The first scene, in which Randy uses the word on Wheel of Fortune, was the first idea for the episode and remained the only idea for a while; Parker called the scene "one of my favorite things we've ever done."

Shortly beforehand, comedian Michael Richards courted massive controversy due to an infamous performance at the Laugh Factory in November 2006 in which he screamed the word "nigger" repeatedly at a group of African American and Hispanic patrons who heckled him. Parker and Stone decided it would be best, considering the media coverage of the incident, to work on the episode then. In the episode's DVD commentary, they noted that it was clear from the video of Richards that he had significant problems, but that they really felt contempt for him when he apologized to civil rights leader Jesse Jackson. Staff writer Vernon Chatman, who is half-Black, was particularly outraged by this, noting that Jackson "is not the ambassador of Black people", which inspired the line in the episode where Token says that Jackson "is not the emperor of Black people". Stan responds by saying, "he told my dad he was". Stone particularly enjoyed the ending of the episode, remarking: "If there was a word as hateful as the n-word [in how it] applies to Black people, if there was a word like that against white people, [they] would make it illegal."

They created the idea of using the epithet to apply to whites only, which was when the rest of the episode began to germinate. While they felt the Randy A story was excellent, they wanted to have a B story involving the boys. They came up with the idea of Stan and Token arguing about his father's use of the word, which remained the only subplot idea. They continued to struggle with the subplot until roughly three days prior to air, when they created the idea of Cartman encountering a little person. They based the little person on an obscure old commercial featuring little people walking around in suits.

== Reception ==
=== Reaction ===
This episode received coverage by the CNN programs Showbiz Tonight and Paula Zahn Now in the days following its broadcast. Kovon and Jill Flowers, who co-founded the organization Abolish the "N" Word, which is linked with the National Association for the Advancement of Colored People, praised this episode, calling it a hilarious but good example of educating the public on the impact of racist slurs such as nigger.

This show, in its own comedic way, is helping people to educate the power of this word, and how it can feel to have hate language directed at you.

— Kovon and Jill Flowers

The Parents Television Council named the episode, along with the episode of The Sarah Silverman Program that aired right after, the "Worst Cable Content of the Week" in its campaign for cable choice. The episode received about 2.8 million viewers.

=== Critical response ===
Travis Fickett of IGN gave the episode a 10/10, commenting, "There's really no other way to explain how this show remains not only brilliantly funny, but more relevant and insightful than anything else on television." In 2009, Sean O'Neal of The A.V. Club praised the episode, remarking: "I've always said that I believe South Park is some of the best satire on TV when it's firing on all cylinders, and to that end I've seen it do ironic racism in a way that's borderline revolutionary [in this episode]."
