= Fantastic Easter Special =

- South Park episode
- Episode no.: Season 11; Episode 5
- Directed by: Trey Parker
- Written by: Trey Parker
- Production code: 1105
- Original air date: April 4, 2007

Episode chronology
← Previous "The Snuke"	Next → "D-Yikes!"
- South Park season 11

"Fantastic Easter Special" is the fifth episode of the eleventh season of the American animated television series South Park, and the 158th episode of the series overall. It first aired on Comedy Central in the United States on April 4, 2007. The episode parodies The Da Vinci Code. "Fantastic Easter Special" was written by series co-creator Trey Parker and is rated TV-MA LV in the United States.

Determined to get the real story behind why he has to decorate eggs for Easter, Stan Marsh starts asking about the connection between Easter eggs and Jesus. The answers lead to an ancient and mysterious secret society to protect the secret of the Easter Bunny.

== Plot ==
When Stan Marsh colors Easter eggs with his family for the upcoming Easter, he questions what it has to do with Jesus. Due to his father Randy's vague response, Stan asks the same question to a mall Easter Bunny. The mall bunny brushes him off and then makes a mysterious phone call. Stan soon finds himself being chased by men in bunny suits. When he gets home, he finds that Randy is part of the plot. Randy tells his son that he is in a society called "The Hare Club for Men", who have guarded the secret of Easter for generations. Randy takes Stan to the headquarters of the Hare Club to be initiated, where he learns that the club reveres an ordinary rabbit named Snowball. The Hare Club for Men's building resembles a Masonic Hall. Just as Stan is about to learn the secret of Easter, the club is ambushed by a group of ninjas, forcing Stan to escape with Snowball. The ninjas and their leader, Bill Donohue, capture the rest of the club. Stan runs off to his friend Kyle Broflovski's house and persuades him to help.

Stan and Kyle manage to track down a man named Professor Teabag (a spoof of Professor Teabing), who supposedly knows the secret of the Hare Club. Teabag explains that Leonardo da Vinci was actually a member of the Hare Club and that Saint Peter was not a man, but a rabbit ("Peter Rabbit"). Da Vinci originally depicted him as such in his painting of the Last Supper, but he was forced by the Catholic Church to paint over it with an image of a man, while secretly leaving clues to Peter's true identity. Teabag explains that Jesus knew no human could speak for Christianity without any acts of corruption and that rabbits were pure, tolerant, and incorruptible, but the church rewrote history to stay in power, suggesting that the club have been kidnapped by the Vatican, who wish to cover up this secret, viewing it as blasphemy. Donohue's ninja attacks again, but Teabag helps the two boys escape by putting marshmallow Peeps in the microwave. It causes an explosion that destroys the mansion, killing both Teabag and the ninjas.

Stan and Kyle go to the Vatican where Stan turns the rabbit over to the Donohue's men, on the condition that the Hare Club members must all be set free and that Snowball remains unharmed. However, Donohue reveals he had actually made the promise on two separate crucifixes, a "double cross", and plans to kill the Hare Club. Pope Benedict XVI opposes this, saying that double-crossing is not considered to be "very Christian", to which Donohue responds by saying that it is what Jesus would have wanted. Jesus himself (after resurrecting from being killed in Iraq) then arrives to intervene, telling them that he actually did plan for the popes to be rabbits, wanting to avoid the current corruption of Donohue. Benedict and his clergy are willing to agree with Jesus, but Donohue refuses and seizes the Pope's mitre, and orders his ninjas to capture everyone, including Benedict and Jesus, declaring himself the new Pope. Donohue orders his minions to lock up Kyle and Jesus, whom he calls the "two Jews", and Benedict. Donohue leads Randy, Stan, and the surviving Hare Club members to the block where there is a gigantic pot for Snowball's execution.

In the cell, Jesus tells Kyle that his "superpowers" only work when he is dead, and the only way to escape is for Kyle to kill him so he can return to life outside the cell. Kyle is hesitant to kill Jesus, but does so after Jesus promises that "Eric Cartman can never know about this". As Donohue is about to execute Snowball, the resurrected Jesus appears in the crowd and kills Donohue by throwing a five-bladed throwing star-like weapon, similar to the "glaive" in the fantasy film Krull. Everyone cheers for Jesus and Snowball is elected Pope. Because he is a rabbit, Snowball cannot speak or tell people how they should lead their lives, just as "Jesus intended". Stan reveals that his adventures have taught him to not ask questions and just dye the eggs.

== Production ==
In the commentary, the creators called it their The Da Vinci Code episode, emphasizing the conspiracy and searching for clues in the eggs. Bill Donohue had been quoted by several news outlets during coverage of previous South Park episodes "Bloody Mary" and "Trapped in the Closet", but "Bill Donohue is not the emperor of Catholics."

== Reception ==
=== Critical response ===
IGN contributor Travis Fickett gave the episode a rating of 10, calling it a "masterpiece" and "controlled comic chaos that only South Park seems able to manage on such a consistent basis." In 2009, Richard Corliss of Time listed the episode as #10 on their list of Top 10 Jesus Films, praising the conspiracy story and its resemblance to The Da Vinci Code and the lyrics of "Peter Cottontail" in Latin. Erik Hinton from PopMatters wrote a favorable review of the episode, saying "they do like killing Jesus, but it's in the service of a profound message of religious tolerance and even-handed treatment."

=== Donohue's reaction ===
The real Donohue has a still of himself wearing the papal mitre from this episode displayed in his office. He sums up the plot as "In the episode, they have me overthrow the pope because the pope is a wimp, and then I take over the church and give it some guts. ... But in the end, Jesus kills me".

== See also ==
- List of Easter television episodes
