= Le Petit Tourette =

- South Park episode
- Episode no.: Season 11; Episode 8
- Written by: Trey Parker
- Production code: 1108
- Original air date: October 3, 2007

Episode chronology
← Previous "Night of the Living Homeless"	Next → "More Crap"
- South Park season 11

"Le Petit Tourette" (French pronunciation: [lə pə.ti tuʁɛt]; meaning "The Little Tourette") is the eighth episode of the eleventh season of the animated television series South Park, and the 161st episode overall. It first aired on Comedy Central in the United States on October 3, 2007. This episode marked the beginning of the second half of the eleventh season. In the episode, Eric Cartman pretends to have Tourette syndrome (TS) so that he can say whatever he wants without getting into trouble. It eventually leads to trouble and he ends up saying things that he would never say. The episode's title is a play on the title of Jean-Luc Godard's 1963 film Le Petit Soldat.

The episode was written by series co-creator Trey Parker and was rated TV-MA LV in the United States, due to language and violence. It was one of the first South Park episodes to use any of the L, S, or V sub-ratings. Parker and Stone had many discussions with Comedy Central as how to portray the language used in the episode. Eventually, the network allowed them to use nearly all curse words except for "fuck", which remained bleeped (but recent reruns of the episode no longer bleep the word). Prior to its premiere, the episode attracted attention from the Tourette Syndrome Association (TSA, renamed in 2015 to the Tourette Association of America), who "fully expect[ed] it to be offensive and insensitive to people with TS".

The episode received mixed reviews from television critics, with some praising the episode's humor and others considering its structure disjointed. The TSA conceded that "the episode was surprisingly well-researched. The highly exaggerated emphasis on coprolalia notwithstanding, for the attentive viewer, there was a surprising amount of accurate information conveyed", adding that several elements of the episode "served as a clever device" for providing accurate facts to the public. "Le Petit Tourette" was released on DVD along with the rest of the eleventh season on August 12, 2008.

== Plot ==
While shopping at a toy store, Eric Cartman sees a boy named Thomas who continuously shouts obscenities, as his mother and other shoppers try to explain to Cartman that he has TS, and is unable to control what he says. Cartman is elated to discover the disorder, and decides to pretend he has the disorder as well so he can get away with shouting obscenities in front of his acquaintances, runs off declaring he's "found a better toy!" whilst singing "(I've Got a) Golden Ticket". Cartman proceeds to successfully convince his mother Liane Cartman and a doctor that he is afflicted with TS, and he is subsequently diagnosed, and the school is notified. Kyle Broflovski quickly deduces that Cartman is faking after the latter gives a speech about his disorder in the hallway; Cartman admits the truth to him but continues to enjoy the deception. When Kyle complains to Principal Victoria, a visiting representative from a TS foundation (who has TS himself) misinterprets his statement as an allegation that all people with TS are faking. Kyle is sent to a meeting of a local support group for children with the disorder, who explain that they truly cannot control their various tics and outbursts, and explain the struggles of living with the disorder. Realizing that Cartman has manipulated everyone else around him into believing the scam, and seeing no way to disprove it, Kyle reluctantly apologizes to the group and to Cartman. However, Cartman takes advantage of the situation to shout vulgar antisemitic remarks at Kyle's parents Gerald and Sheila Broflovski. Thomas soon realizes that Cartman is faking the disorder when he claims that being afflicted with it is "awesome".

Cartman decides to write to Chris Hansen of Dateline NBC, asserting that he wishes to clarify the "struggles" he faces daily due to his "disorder", he intends to make various anti-Semitic remarks while being commended for his bravery. At a congratulatory dinner beforehand, he inadvertently blurts out embarrassing true details from his past, such as a homosexual encounter he had with his cousin, and his crush on "Patty Nelson". Realizing that he has lost the ability to censor himself after saying whatever comes to his mind for so long, he tries to cancel the Dateline interview for fear of humiliating himself, but Hansen convinces him not to back out by telling him about a pedophile who shot himself while trying to back out of appearing on the series To Catch a Predator. Using air quotes around the phrase "shot himself", Hansen insinuates that the man was actually murdered and that the same will happen to Cartman if he backs out. With no way to avoid going on Dateline, Cartman prays for a miracle.

Meanwhile, Kyle teams up with Thomas, who is worried that Cartman's appearance on the show will make others think TS is fun and copy him. Not knowing that Cartman has already given up on his plan, the two boys use the Internet to solicit multiple pedophiles to visit the TV studio. The pedophiles all shoot themselves upon entering the studio and seeing Hansen on stage, causing the audience to panic and flee. Outside, Craig Tucker offers to hang out with Thomas and do his laundry. As Kyle gloats to Cartman over foiling his plan, Cartman tearfully thanks him for preventing him from having to humiliate himself on live TV, and exits: once more singing "(I've Got a) Golden Ticket" in elation. Kyle is disappointed that he has lost a chance to see Cartman brought low.

== Production ==
"Le Petit Tourette" was the mid-season premiere of South Park's eleventh season, and the first episode of their fall run, which consisted of seven episodes. It was not designed as the season premiere, but rather as a "bank" episode, produced mostly prior to the run to allow the team a few days off later on in it.

Series creators Matt Stone and Trey Parker felt the episode with typical censorship bleeps would be unfunny, as the entire goal of the episode is that Cartman can say anything he wants without consequence. They had many discussions with Comedy Central about the show's content; one suggestion put forward was to air it at midnight, as a special episode. The calls came down to negotiating which curse words they could use and with what frequency; despite this, "fuck" would still remain bleeped in the final episode. Stone remarked that had it not been censored, it would have made advertisers unhappy. Parker noted that occasionally, when producing episodes such as this, Comedy Central would view early animatics and get nervous about the content. Executive producer Anne Garefino advised executives to wait and see its fully animated form, after which they easily approve it, due to the simplistic animation style. "As soon as you see it done by shitty cutouts, it makes it all just silly", Parker said.

The episode also features a parody of Chris Hansen, the host of To Catch a Predator. Shortly before the episode was produced, a man featured on the program committed suicide by gunshot, leading to a press frenzy. Parker and Stone noted that while they liked the program, they felt with its growing popularity the show's creators were increasingly overstepping their boundaries to catch predators. "We like To Catch a Predator, [but] we like the Constitution more", Stone said.

== Reception ==
=== Critical response ===
The television weblog TV Squad was extremely positive, calling the episode "the stuff of brilliance". IGN gave the episode a rating of 7.5/10, asserting "this isn't the greatest episode, and not the greatest way to bring back the series—but it's got some great laughs and manages to push its single joke further than expected." Jerome Cusson of 411mania took the middle ground, giving the show a 6.5/10 rating, calling it "hit and miss", and contesting that "while the first half of the show suffered because of a one-note joke, the second half showed why this series remains one of the best on television." On the negative side, BuddyTV contributor Oscar Dahl called the episode a "misfire", criticizing it as "disjointed and a little off-putting."

=== Response from the Tourette Syndrome Association ===
Prior to the airing, the Tourette Syndrome Association (TSA) issued a press release saying they had requested that Comedy Central air their public service announcements during or after the show and that they "fully expect[ed] it to be offensive and insensitive to people with TS". The President of the TSA said, "we are actually surprised it took the creators so long to use TS as comedy fodder in this program, since no disability, illness or controversial topic is off limits to them." Following the episode, they issued a second press release, expressing concern that the episode perpetuated the misconception that most people with TS have coprolalia (involuntary swearing) when in fact 85–90% of people with TS do not. They conceded that "the episode was surprisingly well-researched. The highly exaggerated emphasis on coprolalia notwithstanding, for the attentive viewer, there was a surprising amount of accurate information conveyed", adding that several elements of the episode "served as a clever device" for providing accurate facts to the public.

=== Response from Chris Hansen ===
According to an interview with DJ Vlad, prior to the episode's airing, Hansen was told by one of his talent agents that South Park would be airing an episode featuring his likeness. However, twenty minutes in, he received a follow-up message, claiming the episode had gotten "dark". After viewing the episode for the first time, Hansen enjoyed it, and recalled that his sons and all of their friends suddenly thought that he was "cool" because he was parodied on one of their favourite shows.
