= Guitar Queer-O =

- South Park episode
- Episode no.: Season 11; Episode 13
- Directed by: Trey Parker
- Written by: Trey Parker
- Production code: 1113
- Original air date: November 7, 2007

Episode chronology
← Previous "Imaginationland Episode III"	Next → "The List"
- South Park season 11

"Guitar Queer-O" is the thirteenth episode of the eleventh season and the 166th overall episode of American animated television series South Park, which first aired on Comedy Central on November 7, 2007. The episode was rated TV-MA L in the United States. The episode parodies the Guitar Hero video games, and aired ten days after the release of Guitar Hero III: Legends of Rock.

In the episode, Stan and Kyle are hooked on Guitar Hero, but Stan's superior skills on the video game damages his friendship with Kyle.

== Plot ==
Stan and Kyle are obsessed with the video game Guitar Hero, and attempt to break the game's scoring record in front of their friends. As soon as they break the 100,000 points record on "Carry on Wayward Son", they are contacted by Charles Kincade, a talent agent, who wants to offer them recording contracts. They become Guitar Hero rock star celebrities overnight, enjoying the hedonistic "sex and drugs" lifestyle. The record company organizes a future event where Stan and Kyle will attempt to break a 1 million point record in front of a live audience. Stan is taken aside by his manager and told that Kyle is holding him back, and encourages Stan to dump Kyle in favor of another kid, Thad Jarvis, who can play many Guitar Hero songs "acoustically", having memorized what buttons to press instead of relying on the on-screen cues.

Kyle discovers Stan practicing with Thad and angrily breaks up their "band". Kyle goes on to perform at a local bowling alley by its owner for free food and drink, improving as he plays. Stan becomes stressed out over the upcoming event, and tries to seek refuge using a different video game, Heroin Hero, where the only objective is literally chasing a dragon (futilely) as the in-game player injects himself with heroin. The game further shortens his temper and concentration, and he gets into a fight with Thad, who subsequently leaves Stan. Stan, still intoxicated with Heroin Hero, is forced to play the event solo, but ends up getting a miserable score and throwing up on stage; after the audience leaves and the game audience "boos" Stan, Kincade angrily admonishes him by saying "You blew it! You had it all and you blew it!" and subsequently leaves him.

Stan comes back to the video game store and decides to pick another game to play, but when offered by the game store owner Rehab Hero (which remedies the heroin-like addiction of a former player to Heroin Hero), Stan instead selects a simple driving game. While driving around in-game, Stan hears "Carry on Wayward Son" on the radio and remembers the good time he had with Kyle. Stan goes to apologize to Kyle and, after a brief spat, the two become friends again, dumping the recording contract. They go back home and go on to break the 1 million point record in front of their friends. To their shock, the game rewards them by telling them, "Congratulations! You Are Fags!". The two become upset that they have worked so hard only to be insulted, and angrily walk out; Cartman and Butters start to play the game, with Butters eagerly requesting that he gets to be the one to betray Cartman "after the sex and drugs party".

== Cultural references ==
The celebrities that the boys meet at the party are real-life Colorado celebrities: KDVR news anchor Ron Zapollo (though he is recognized as being from "channel 4", where he had not worked since the late 1980s), American Furniture Warehouse President Jake Jabs, and diamond mogul Tom Shane.

Jay Cutler, the then-quarterback for the Denver Broncos, was insulted by Stan in the episode ("You kind of suck, but my dad says you might be good some day"). Cutler himself responded lightheartedly, saying "I thought it was funny. They can make fun of me if they want to."

Stan's new Guitar Hero partner, Thad, saying "I quit! I quit, I quit, I quit!" is a reference to the film That Thing You Do!.

Stan's manager Charles Kincaid is a reference to Reuben Kincaid of The Partridge Family and even looks like him, while the record company executive is a reference to The Colonel James from the film Boogie Nights.

Stan asks his new partner to play Jordan and John the Fisherman, written by guitarist Buckethead and theme song artist Primus, respectively.

== Reception ==
The episode drew in 4 million total viewers (P2+) and was the most watched telecast of the year on Comedy Central, as well as the most watched program in all of television for Wednesday night among men 18–34 and the most watched program on cable among persons 18–49. The episode was the highest rating since "Cartman's Mom Is Still a Dirty Slut", beating the previous record-holder "Imaginationland Episode III", the episode that aired one week before "Guitar Queer-O".

Despite good ratings, the episode received some mediocre reviews. IGN called it a "lackluster episode" saying that it was "based on a concept that could have proved fun – but ultimately doesn't seem to be enough for an entire episode." 411Mania also criticized the episode, saying that "the first twenty-one and a half minutes weren't funny at all" claiming that the last line of the episode was the best part. TV Squad, on the other hand, gave the episode a somewhat positive review.

A portion of the episode was used on NPR's Day to Day to discuss the idea that the popularity and interest in video games like Guitar Hero III or Rock Band could supplant traditional instruments for kids.

The New York Times identified Guitar Hero's reference in the episode as the most effective TV product placement for that week.

== Home media ==
"Guitar Queer-O", along with the thirteen other episodes from South Park's eleventh season, were released on a three-disc DVD set in the United States on August 12, 2008. The set includes brief audio commentaries by Parker and Stone for each episode.
