= D-Yikes! =

- South Park episode
- Episode no.: Season 11; Episode 6
- Directed by: Trey Parker
- Written by: Trey Parker
- Production code: 1106
- Original air date: April 11, 2007

Episode chronology
← Previous "Fantastic Easter Special"	Next → "Night of the Living Homeless"
- South Park season 11

"D-Yikes!" is the sixth episode of the eleventh season of the American animated sitcom South Park. The 159th overall episode, it first aired on Comedy Central in the United States on April 11, 2007. In the episode, frustrated with men, Mrs. Garrison makes the boys write an essay on The Old Man and the Sea. The boys hire Mexican day laborers to do the job for them, but they misinterpret the term "essay." Meanwhile, Mrs. Garrison has become a lesbian and finds the bar she hangs out in is about to be taken over by Persian club owners. Mrs. Garrison takes a stand in the name of saving the one place that lets her be the woman she is.

The episode is rated TV-MA L, and it is a parody of the film 300.

== Plot ==
When the episode begins, Mrs. Garrison storms into her classroom enraged over a failed date, and takes her anger out on her male students with an essay assignment over the weekend, making them read The Old Man and the Sea by Ernest Hemingway in its entirety. At Cartman's urging, they hire local Mexican laborers looking for work to read the book and write their essays for them. When they come back for their essays on Monday morning, they find out that the Mexicans misunderstood them, and instead of writing essays they wrote to their éses, a slang term in Chicano Spanish for friends. Meanwhile, Mrs. Garrison is working out at Curves when she meets a woman named Allison. Allison invites her to "Les Bos" (pronounced "le-bo"), a nearby bar, but Mrs. Garrison is shocked to find out that it's a lesbian bar. After being seduced by Allison, the two engage in scissoring. The next day, when the boys try to explain themselves to Mrs. Garrison about their essay, she happily gives them more time to work, announcing she is a lesbian, which the class is highly supportive of.

Garrison returns to Les Bos and becomes sociable with all the women, but then is shocked to discover that the bar is being sold to Persians, who plan to make it into a Club Persh Dance Club. Soon after, the Persians send a representative to see the women at the bar. The representative tries to persuade the women there will be no real change, as the lesbians will still be welcome. Nevertheless, it will no longer be solely a lesbian bar, and will be decorated with stereotypically Persian decorations. Mrs. Garrison kicks the messenger in the testicles in retaliation. After the representative returns to the Persian's club, an army of sixty other Persians prepare to storm the bar, but they fail to defeat the women. The remaining Persians go to see their boss, Rauf Xerxes, who decides to handle the situation personally.

Mrs. Garrison decides that the lesbians need a spy inside Club Persh, in order to find illegal activity to use as blackmail, and hires the Mexicans to spy on the Persians. Later, Xerxes arrives, and attempts to reason with Mrs. Garrison, even offering her the job of running the club when he takes control. Mrs. Garrison declines, and tells Xerxes that she knows the Persian leader's secret — Xerxes is actually a woman, found out by the Mexicans when they saw her working out at Curves. Xerxes is shocked that Mrs. Garrison knows her secret, and says this must be kept secret from other Persians as women aren't allowed to have any power in her culture. Mrs. Garrison agrees, and in a parallel of her own seduction by Allison, she seduces Xerxes and the two engage in scissoring. Xerxes decides to keep Les Bos a lesbian bar, and is seen at the bar herself. Mrs. Garrison then explains that the school has hired substitutes to take over her class for a while, who turn out to be the same Mexicans again. As the Mexicans lead a math lesson where they teach the class how to add differing fractions, the boys decide that the Mexicans are better teachers than Mrs. Garrison.

== Reception ==
IGN rated this episode 6.5 passable and said "There are some funny moments, as is almost always the case with any episode of this series. When Ms. Garrison first realizes she's a lesbian and tells the class 'I'm gay!'. Everyone is a little confused and Stan says 'Again?'. The joke about 'writing essays' is a good laugh. Another moment is when 'Janet' Garrison first figures out how two women make love and there's a smash-cut to her and her new girlfriend 'scissoring'. It's a shock-moment and makes you wonder how they get away with stuff like this. However, when they use the joke again at the end, it's now not nearly as funny. You can't shock the audience twice with the same joke - it just doesn't work that way".

== Cultural references ==
The lesbians' fight against the Persians, with Mrs. Garrison kicking the messenger, Rauf Xerxes's physical appearance, and a plethora of slow-motion sequences, are references to the Zack Snyder film 300.

The film that is parodied, 300, portrays the defense of the Greek city-states by Spartan warriors at the Battle of Thermopylae. The bar "Les Bos" can be compared to the Greek island of Lesbos, from which the word "lesbian" is derived.

It is also a take on the closings of gay bars across the United States.
