= Night of the Living Homeless =

- South Park episode
- Episode no.: Season 11; Episode 7
- Directed by: Trey Parker
- Written by: Trey Parker
- Production code: 1107
- Original air date: April 18, 2007

Episode chronology
← Previous "D-Yikes!"	Next → "Le Petit Tourette"
- South Park season 11

"Night of the Living Homeless" is the seventh episode of the eleventh season of the American animated sitcom South Park. It originally aired on April 18, 2007. This episode marks the end of the first half of the eleventh season, which continued on October 3, 2007. The episode is rated TV-MA LV. It parodies various zombie movies, in particular George A. Romero's Night of the Living Dead, Dawn of the Dead (including its remake), Day of the Dead and Land of the Dead, plus Return of the Living Dead (the homeless repeatedly utter "change" instead of "brains"). The episode is also a satire and commentary on discrimination against the homeless.

== Plot ==
After a buildup of homeless people in South Park, Kyle recommends that they do something about it, and Eric Cartman agrees. Cartman announces that he will jump over them on his skateboard, wearing a cape, insisting that it was Kyle's idea. The town council has also taken notice of the problem, and the Park County's expert on homelessness advises that if no one gives them anything, they will leave.

Kyle Broflovski feels bad for the homeless and gives one of them twenty dollars that he was originally saving up for a new Xbox game, but the homeless man asks Kyle for more money. The number of homeless immediately grows dramatically, and they wander everywhere asking for change in a zombie-like manner. Randy Marsh, Stephen and Linda Stotch, Jimbo Kern, and Gerald Broflovski wind up stranded on top of the town Community Center, with hordes of homeless below. Gerald tries to make it through the homeless to get to the bus, but gives them all his change, only to realize that he has no money for the bus, to which Randy then proclaims "He's become one of them!"

The boys escape the horde of homeless in the sewers and head for the home of the homeless expert. He informs the boys that homeless people actually live on change, like food. He tells them that the nearby town of Evergreen had solved a similar homeless problem, and that they should travel there and find out what they did. Once they leave, homeless people try to get into his home, and he shoots himself in the head to "take the easy way out." This fails to work, since he consistently shoots himself nine times in various non-lethal areas of the head and torso (a close parody of the Curtis "50 Cent" Jackson shooting). As the boys travel, more adults escape to the Community Center roof. One of the adults, Glenn, is able to call his wife on his cellphone after getting a signal and discovers that, because of the high numbers of homeless in South Park, the property values have plummeted and his house has been repossessed, thus making him homeless, and Randy immediately points his shotgun at Glenn. Glenn begins to ask the others for change to put his belongings in storage, and Randy kills him.

The boys make it to Evergreen, which has been completely devastated. There are only three remaining survivors, who are men dressed in camouflage and heavily armed. They are distrustful of the boys and threaten to shoot them, since, as minors, they are not home-owners and are therefore "homeless", but they are able to recognize Cartman as "the same kid who jumped over thirty homeless people on his skateboard", so they decide to help the boys. While talking to the survivors, the men explain that the homeless situation got so out of control that it was hard to tell who was homeless and who wasn't. During the discussion, Kyle finds a pamphlet on the ground, which advertises South Park as a "haven for the homeless". He realizes that the Evergreen townspeople got rid of their homeless by convincing them to migrate to South Park, and the men further explain that most of the homeless from their town originally came from Texas, in which the city of San Antonio was able to get rid of their homeless population by sending them to Evergreen in the same manner. Just then, a hideously disfigured woman emerges from the burned remains of one of the buildings holding a shotgun, revealing herself to be the wife of one of the men who tried to burn her alive after believing she was homeless. She tries to shoot her husband, and all the adults end up shooting and killing each other, with the boys realizing that they must get rid of the homeless because, as Stan Marsh reasons, their parents are just as stupid as the people of Evergreen, and South Park would fall apart in the same way.

Kyle comes up with a plan to save their town, and the boys heavily reinforce a bus that they find and drive it to the Community Center in South Park, where the homeless have gathered below the adults. They advertise California as "super cool to the homeless" by singing a modified version of 2Pac and Dr. Dre's "California Love", called "California Loves the Homeless", and lead them there. Afterwards, Cartman shows off by jumping his skateboard over three homeless people, and the episode ends with Stan stating "Honestly, I don't know what you see in this, Kyle."

== Production ==
Writing on the episode's basic story and jokes began at the show's writer's retreat at Hyatt Grand Champions Resort conference center, in Indian Wells, California during the break between seasons 10 and 11. The song at the end of the episode includes the lyrics, "In the city of Venice, right by Matt's house, you can chill if you're homeless." According to the DVD commentary, Matt Stone does live in Venice, California and there are a lot of homeless people there.

== Reception ==
The episode was rated 7.5 out of 10.0 on IGN, reviewer Travis Fickett describing the episode as "a take-it-or-leave-it episode". Fickett suggested that the episode was "sustained by mostly non sequitur jokes that work all on their own", singling out the multiple suicide attempts of the homeless advisor and Stan's suggestion that Kyle was responsible for suggesting jumping over the homeless. TV Squad's Adam Finley gave a more positive review, rating the episode as 7 out of 7. Finley noted the parody of zombie films and also singled out the running joke of jumping the homeless on a skateboard.
