= Cartman Sucks =

- South Park episode
- Episode no.: Season 11; Episode 2
- Directed by: Trey Parker
- Written by: Trey Parker
- Production code: 1102
- Original air date: March 14, 2007

Episode chronology
← Previous "With Apologies to Jesse Jackson"	Next → "Lice Capades"
- South Park season 11

"Cartman Sucks" is the second episode of the eleventh season of the American animated television series South Park. It originally aired on March 14, 2007 on Comedy Central. The main plot deals with Eric Cartman's efforts to recover an incriminating photograph that may call his sexual orientation into question, whereas the subplot, which focuses on Butters Stotch, explores childhood gay conversion therapy.

== Plot ==
Cartman has developed a hobby of photographing Butters Stotch in often demeaning positions whilst he sleeps over, which he excitedly shares with Stan, Kenny, and Kyle at his home before he shoos them away as Butters arrives. The following day at the bus stop, Cartman excitedly shares what he considers to be his magnum opus: a photograph of Cartman smiling and performing a thumbs-up with Butters's penis in his mouth, which he claims makes Butters gay. However, Kyle observes that a male who performs oral sex on another male is the one perceived to be the homosexual, thus making Cartman "gay". Kyle then deceives a horrified Cartman into taking a similar picture with his and Butters's positions switched, which he claims will "cancel out the gay polarity." Cartman runs to Butters's house, attempting to trick him into allowing himself to be blindfolded and opening his mouth.

Butters is initially skeptical, until Cartman assures him he "won't put anything yicky in [his] mouth.". As he is about to insert his penis into Butters's mouth, Butters' dad, Stephen, walks in on them and panics as Cartman flees. Stephen declares that Butters is bi-curious, much to Butters' confusion, though Stephen explains that it means that his son is "confused." Butters concedes he is indeed "confused": dumbfounded about the transpiring events which he has been unable to observe (due to still wearing the blindfold). Stephen takes his son to Camp New Grace, a Christian conversion therapy camp, whose organizers repeatedly reinforce the idea that the boys there are "confused."

The camp is filled with miserable young boys, and suicide is common. Butters befriends his roommate and "accountabili-buddy", a nervous and insecure boy called Bradley, though the two are punished when camp authorities find Bradley's 1979 male underwear catalog. After Bradley realizes that he has a crush on Butters, he concludes that he is beyond hope and decides to end his life. Butters and the camp staff find Bradley on the outer ledge of a bridge and try to persuade him to come down. When Butters finds the staff to be unsympathetic, he excoriates them, telling them that he is sick of people telling him he is confused and that he was never confused until the idea was continuously reiterated by camp staff. He elaborates that if he is a product of god and bi-curious, this must mean that god himself must be bi-curious as well. Somewhat encouraged by this expression of confidence and pride, Bradley decides not to commit suicide and comes down. Seeing that Butters is happy being bi-curious, Stephen admits that he is bi-curious as well and that he enjoys his curiosity. The statement prompts a shared laugh between the two, though confuses Butters due to his naive nature and lack of awareness (or more likely repression of the knowledge) of Stephen's past bicurious behavior.

Meanwhile, having discovered that Kyle was tricking him, Cartman decides to throw away the picture of him with Butters's penis in his mouth and never bring it up again. However, Stan, Kyle, and Kenny, pointing out that they already know about it, proceed to blackmail Cartman into being nice to them, claiming they will tell everyone if he refuses. Cartman refuses, claiming the task to be excessively difficult and decides to photoshop the picture so it would be Kyle with the penis in his mouth, thus shifting potential accusations of homosexuality to him.

When Cartman is unable to retrieve the picture to photoshop it, he is convinced that Kyle has stolen it in order to show it at school during show and tell, thus humiliating Cartman. Kyle's attempts to convince Cartman that he has not stolen it are unsuccessful, as are the other avenues through which Cartman attempts to recover it from him. Cartman convinces his mother to call Sheila Boflovski and retrieve the "stolen" photo. Though when he is reassured that Kyle does not possess it, he claims the ordeal to be a conspiracy and that, due to Kyle's Jewish heritage, his mother is lying to protect her son.

Resolving to prevent Kyle from having the satisfaction of showing it off, Cartman presents a series of artistic photographs during show-and-tell, claiming he seeks to be a "respected photographer" due to his passion for photography. Before showing the final photo, Cartman claims it is somewhat controversial, and proceeds to show the image of himself with Butters' penis in his mouth: which he claims is a protest against the War In Iraq, elaborating that "it's wrong that we still have our troops there!", shocking his classmates and teacher, Mrs. Garrison. Suddenly, Mr. Mackey comes to the classroom and relays a message to Cartman from his mother: she found the original photograph under his desk at home. Cartman's humiliation is completed as Kyle glares at him with a look of bored disdain.

== Production ==
The scene in which Cartman tells the boys that he put Butters's penis in his mouth had originally been written for the sixth season episode "Asspen", but was cut from the episode, before being repurposed as the basis for this episode's plot.

== Reception ==
IGN gave this episode a score of 9.0 and said:

Whenever South Park builds an episode around Cartman's misdeeds, it's bound to be good. One of the best examples of this being "Scott Tenorman Must Die". In that classic episode, Eric's naivety got him in trouble. The same happens here, as he plays a prank that has unintended consequences – and gets in even bigger trouble when he believes Kyle's reasoning behind "canceling it out".

The episode was released on the two-disc DVD collection A Little Box of Butters.

== Australian rating controversy ==
In 2011, the Australian Communications and Media Authority made a complaint against Austar for falsely rating the episode an M rating, instead of MA15+ (equivalent to TV-14 and TV-MA, respectively), as it featured strong sexual material and self-harm, which normally require an MA15+ classification. ACMA saw that the episode contained strong visual and verbal sexual references and, although they were stylized depictions of oral sex, their imagery was still considered to be strong for an M rating. Moreover, visual depictions of suicide, while justified by the storyline, were also deemed strong in nature, when the M classification only allows for moderate impact. Breaching the ASTRA Codes of Practice, Austar recognized that it had classified the episode incorrectly, given that the Classification Board previously classified the Episode MA15+ for the Season 11 DVD.

== See also ==
- Homosexuality and Christianity
