= More Crap =

- South Park episode
- Episode no.: Season 11; Episode 9
- Directed by: Trey Parker
- Written by: Trey Parker
- Production code: 1109
- Original air date: October 10, 2007

Episode chronology
← Previous "Le Petit Tourette"	Next → "Imaginationland Episode I"
- South Park season 11

"More Crap" is the ninth episode of the eleventh season of the animated television series South Park, and the 162nd episode of the series overall. It was originally broadcast on Comedy Central in the United States on October 10, 2007. In the episode, Randy Marsh produces what is apparently "the biggest crap" ever taken, but his claims for the world record are challenged.

"More Crap" is highly scatological in tone, with its plot and humor revolving around feces as a topic. It is one of the few episodes of South Park in which neither Cartman, Kyle, nor Kenny appear. The episode satirizes U2 vocalist Bono, who is portrayed as strongly arrogant and competitive due to harboring an embarrassing secret. The plot of "More Crap" satirizes the competitive nature of aiming to achieve a record in a peculiar category, and parodies elements of the 2007 documentary The King of Kong: A Fistful of Quarters.

The episode aired shortly after South Park received an Emmy Award that year for the episode "Make Love, Not Warcraft". A running gag in "More Crap" makes reference to the series's Emmy-wins, during especially scatological scenes.

== Plot ==
Randy Marsh is severely constipated and has been unable to defecate for over three weeks, which he attributes to excessive consumption of P. F. Chang's. After taking a prescription laxative by his doctor, he undergoes an extremely painful bowel movement and produces an abnormally large, football-shaped chunk of feces. He is impressed with its size, although his wife Sharon and daughter Shelley are disgusted and annoyed when he insists on showing them, as well as keeping it in the basement. Certain that he has broken a record of some sort, after being learned that the Guinness World Records doesn't have that kind of record, Randy contacts the Zürich-based European Fecal Standards and Measurements office. Representatives from the institute conclude that Randy has achieved the world record, weighing the feces in at 8.6 "couric"s (one couric is approximately equal to 2.5 pounds or 1.1 kilograms). As Randy is the first American to ever achieve the record, the American government holds a ceremony in his honor. However, it is interrupted by a video of Bono, the previous record holder, claiming that he has produced feces weighing 9.5 courics. His claim is accepted, despite his only evidence being an unverified photograph.

Randy becomes despondent over the loss of his record, before his friends convince him to train to reclaim the position. After three weeks of eating, an ultrasound reveals his feces to have reached up to 14 courics in weight. Bono successfully demands that Randy be required to defecate at the headquarters in Zürich. In response, Randy's son Stan visits Bono's mansion and tries to appeal to him, noting Bono's overt success in comparison to Randy's failures. However, an indignant Bono refuses to be "number two" at anything. Bono's butler reveals to Stan that Randy may die if he defecates. As they head towards Zürich, the butler explains that no one has ever survived defecating in such large amounts. He further explains to Stan that Bono set his record in 1960, the year of his birth; Stan realizes that Bono is not the record holder, but the record itself.

Everyone is gathered in Zürich waiting for Randy to defecate. Stan rushes in and reveals the truth about Bono, which the institute's leader, Sir Orloff Broloff, confirms; he reveals that he defecated Bono in 1960, and his pride was such that he raised him as his child ever since. Over time, Bono grew strongly indignant at being "number two", and strove to be number one in many fields; Stan realizes that this is why Bono can help many people through his humanitarian work and yet still "seem like a piece of shit." Broloff further reveals that Bono has grown to over 80 courics in weight and is almost six feet tall, a record that remains unmatched. At that moment, Randy finally expels a pillar of feces that lifts him off the toilet seat and is estimated to weigh more than 100 courics. Randy is thus proclaimed the new record holder, and an institute member lifts a recurring Emmy image off the screen and presents it to Randy by lodging it in his feces.

== Production and themes ==
Parts of the plot of "More Crap" derive from the 2007 documentary The King of Kong: A Fistful of Quarters. The documentary follows Steve Wiebe as he tries to claim the world high score for the arcade game Donkey Kong from reigning champion Billy Mitchell. In the documentary, Wiebe beats the record but is suspected of using a machine that has been tampered with. To prove his gaming skills, Wiebe performs the high score in front of a live audience, before Mitchell sends in a low-quality VHS tape depicting himself achieving a higher score. Bono's personality in the episode is similar to the depiction of Mitchell in the documentary, including how he is allowed to play by different rules than other competitors. South Park creators Trey Parker and Matt Stone spoke highly of the documentary, calling it a "really well-done movie".

South Park has a history of using toilet humor since its debut, such as the recurring character Mr. Hankey, a sentient piece of feces. While the series gained reputation for its use of political humor as it progressed, scatological humor still remained a staple in its later seasons. "More Crap" was named as "perhaps [South Park's] most poo-centric episode of all time". In the episode, women - such as Randy's wife Sharon - are portrayed as not understanding the pride men can feel for the size of their feces. This has been viewed as Parker and Stone's awareness to toilet humor being more appealing to men. This divide in the appreciation of toilet humor was further satirized in the thirteenth season episode "Eat, Pray, Queef". Randy's love for his growing excrement is portrayed at one point in an analogy of a mother's love for her unborn child. In the scene, Randy's clinician shows him his "unborn" feces via medical ultrasonography, and warns him against traveling by airplane, as he is in his "turd trimester" - a pun on the third period of pregnancy.

"More Crap" was written and directed by Trey Parker, and was produced and broadcast as the second episode of the second run of South Park's eleventh season, after the season premiere, "Le Petit Tourette". The episode originally aired on Comedy Central in the United States on October 10, 2007, and is rated TV-MA L. The episode features regular voice-acting from Parker and Stone for most characters (with Parker as Randy and Stan), as well as April Stewart and Mona Marshall for female voices. South Park staff writer Kyle McCulloch portrayed the voice of Bono.

== Cultural references ==
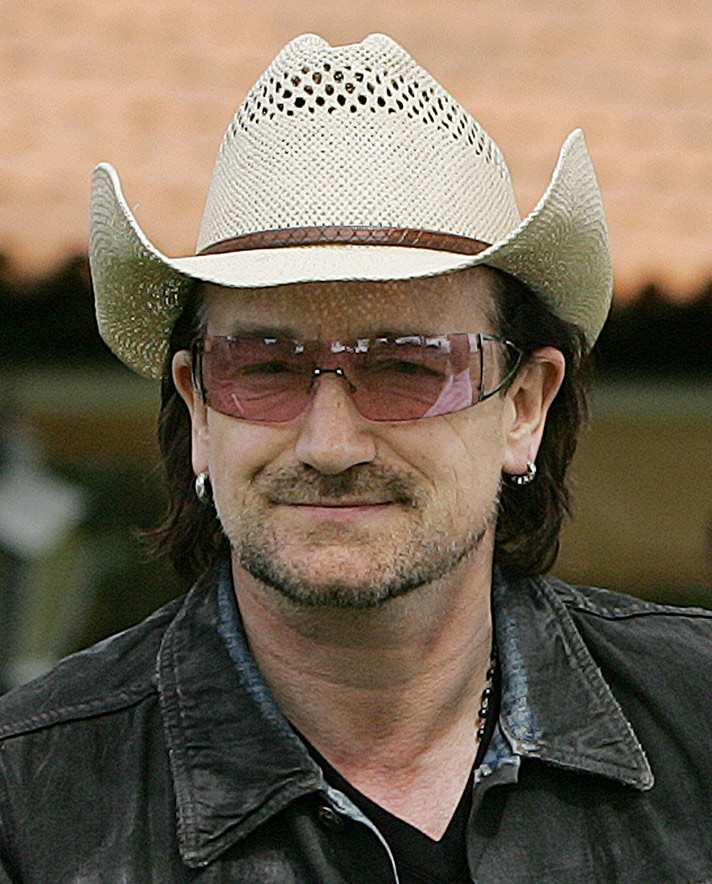
Singer, musician and humanitarian Bono is parodied in "More Crap"

"More Crap" satirizes Irish singer, musician, and philanthropist Bono, the principal vocalist of U2. Bono is portrayed as obsessed with being the best at everything and winning awards, and is criticized for not letting others claim success over him. Stan makes remarks about Bono's wealth and knighthood, as well as his highly successful band, and his "hot wife", Alison Hewson. The episode depicts Bono in Africa at one point, and makes reference to his numerous accolades, including his 22 Grammy Awards, and his nominations for an Academy Award, a Golden Globe Award, and the Nobel Peace Prize. In a joke, Bono is revealed to have first-place trophies in much smaller scale categories as well, such as "most Sports Illustrated subscriptions sold". In the episode, people claim that Bono is both "talented" and "caring", being "able to do so much, try to help so many people", while still "seem[ing] like such a piece of crap". As the plot progresses, the comparison between Bono and feces moves from metaphorical to literal, as he is revealed to be an actual piece of feces raised as a human. As such, Bono's obsession with being number one is his way of compensating for being born "number two" - a euphemism for feces.

Near the end of the episode, when Bono is breastfed by his father, they both refer to breast milk as "bitty". This alludes to the British sketch comedy series Little Britain, in which the character Harvey constantly insists on receiving "bitty" from his mother's breast, despite being an adult.

"More Crap" aired less than one month after South Park received a Creative Arts Emmy Award for "Outstanding Animated Program (for Programming Less Than One Hour)" that year, at the 59th Primetime Emmy Awards for the episode "Make Love Not Warcraft". The episode makes fun of having won the award in a running gag; several times during the episode - such as when Randy is looking at the excrement inside of him through an ultrasound image - a caption appears on screen, with a spinning Emmy Award along with the text "Emmy Award Winning Series".

== Reception ==
TV Squad gave the episode a highly positive review, stating that "it's low taste but it's South Park low taste, which makes it funny", and said that the creators are "still on a roll. Possibly a toilet paper roll". IGN had mixed feelings about the episode, calling it "amusing, but not terribly so", and "both bizarre and pretty damn funny". The site gave the episode a rating of 7.4 out of 10.

Trey Parker and Matt Stone both professed their love of the episode, but said that it is a polarizing one for the audience, claiming that if a viewer is not on board with the episode's toilet humor, then the whole episode breaks down for them. The creators claimed that young people and women reacted poorly to the episode. Parker said that his father, who is the basis for Randy's character, was very thrilled by the episode.

The crew of The King of Kong: A Fistful of Quarters was flattered by the episode's plot being based on their documentary. Director Seth Gordon said that they "considered it such a flattering compliment that [the writers of South Park] would even consider borrowing the structure of King of Kong for one of their episodes". He added that he didn't think the episode was fair to Bono. The film's producer, Ed Cunningham, is a fan of South Park, and said that "hear[ing] about South Park that they actually spoofed the whole movie just blew [him] away." The makers eventually got in touch with the South Park studios.

P. F. Chang's China Bistro spokesperson Laura Cherry responded positively to the episode, and added that the restaurant chain's name has been used several times in the series. A Comedy Central spokeswoman said that the show's creators love the restaurant's food, and "have no bad experiences with P.F. Chang's to report".

After the episode, a fan-created website for the fictional European Fecal Standards and Measurements Institute appeared on the Internet. It is presented as the official website of the institute, with distinct pages describing its work and organization structure. In accord with the episode, the site names Randy Marsh as the current record-holder, but it also claims that the record's previous holder was President of the European Council Herman Van Rompuy, who "is still considered one of the most prolific fecal producers". Van Rompuy was not referenced in the South Park episode.
