= The Snuke =

- South Park episode
- Mayhem around South Park, shown with a split screen, 24-style. From top left: Hillary Clinton gets hospitalized, Kyle investigates the motive of a terrorist threat, CIA helicopters land in South Park, and Baahir plays checkers with Butters.
- Episode no.: Season 11; Episode 4
- Directed by: Trey Parker
- Written by: Trey Parker
- Production code: 1104
- Original air date: March 28, 2007

Episode chronology
← Previous "Lice Capades"	Next → "Fantastic Easter Special"
- South Park season 11

"The Snuke" is the fourth episode of the eleventh season (or the 157th episode overall) of Comedy Central's animated comedy series South Park. It is largely a parody of the television series 24 and was originally broadcast on March 28, 2007. The episode is rated TV-MA L.

In the episode, a new Muslim student joins the class, and Cartman immediately suspects him of being a terrorist. After finding out that Hillary Clinton (who in real-life was running for the democratic nomination for president in the 2008 United States presidential election at the time) is scheduled to campaign in town that day, he informs the CIA and does some research. The CIA shows up and detects the scent of a bomb deep within Mrs. Clinton's vagina. Through complex networking and investigating, the source of the bomb is found and the day is saved.

== Plot ==
During class, Ms. Garrison introduces a new student, Baahir Hassan Abdul Hakeem. Cartman is freaked out and heads for the classroom door. Garrison asks what is wrong and Cartman says he suspects Baahir is a terrorist. Cartman, while observing Baahir playing with Butters, calls Kyle who is sick at home and tells him to check Baahir's Myspace page, looking for any signs of terrorist activity. All he can find is that Baahir's favorite band is listed as White Stripes, when in class, he said it was Blink-182. Cartman then calls Officer Barbrady and tells him the school is in danger. Officer Barbrady contacts Principal Victoria and the school is evacuated. Butters then invites Baahir over to his house to play Checkers. Cartman thinks it is odd for terrorists to just blow up a school and has Kyle search Google for any important upcoming events.

Kyle discovers that Hillary Clinton is stopping in South Park for a campaign rally that day. Cartman then calls the CIA to get them to call off the rally and demands to speak with the President. Hillary Clinton is informed of the threat but does not call off the rally, declaring that she will not be bullied by terrorist threats. Chris, one of her men, then calls a Russian group in a warehouse and tells them they 'know about the bomb'. It was planned to be detonated in Boston but heightened security pushes them to set it off in South Park. Cartman searches the crowd at the rally but does not find Baahir, and decides to head over to his house to see if he is there. At the rally, Hillary Clinton gets on stage and the CIA releases a 'bomb-sniffing' pig, which discovers that the bomb is in Hillary's vagina. The CIA head Alan Thompson and his team meet up with Cartman and they head over to Baahir's house together. Stan heads over to Kyle's house to see what he's doing. Kyle explains he did a Google search for Hillary Clinton's campaign rally and was led to a YouTube account where a Russian man, Vladimir Stolfsky (the leader of the Russian terrorists), has videos of every single Hillary Clinton rally. He then cross-references Vladimir's YouTube profile with his MySpace page and blog, revealing that he is an old school communist. The CIA and Cartman raid Baahir's home but they find no detonator and that Baahir is at Butters' house.

Cartman interrogates Baahir's parents and tortures them by farting in their faces. Kyle and Stan find a bunch of old podcasts by Vladimir with links to eBay, and plan to search his user name and see what he's been buying. Homeland Security breaks in and takes over the room, then the FBI takes over, then the ATF takes over, then the President's staff personally take over. At the interrogation, Baahir's mother gets a call on her cell phone and it is Baahir who tells them he is at Butters' house, and Cartman heads in alone. Kyle is able to take charge again by using the line every new agency exclaims when taking over: "Not anymore you're not." When Cartman rushes to Butters' house to confront Baahir, they are both captured by Vladimir who says that all this was planned by the United States' 'first enemy'. Cartman guesses the Russians, then the Germans, then the Germans again, before he realizes in disbelief that Vladimir is talking about the British.

Baahir says that the British are using them and Vladimir and his men will die, to which Vladimir responds, "Maybe, but we'll be rich." The British plan to use the bomb as a means of keeping America distracted while they sail there (in old wood boats with 18th-century weapons and clothing) to 'end the American Revolution’. Not long after, Kyle and the federal agents also discover the British plot. They send in troops to stop the Russians and jets to stop the British. When Queen Elizabeth II discovers that the ships have been sunk, she kills herself by placing a handgun in her mouth and firing it. Cartman takes credit for stopping the terrorist plot, saying that even though Muslims were not responsible, his intolerance led to the plot being discovered. Baahir and his family are outraged by the racism in South Park and state that they will leave the country, much to Butters' disappointment which leads Cartman to take credit for that as well.

== Reception ==
IGN gave the episode a score of 9 out of 10, praising the celebrity parodies, innuendos regarding the titular bomb, and attention to detail in comparison to the TV show 24. Parker and Stone mention in the commentary of "The Snuke" that the actual cast and crew of 24 watched the episode as it aired and were so delighted, they sent over one of the suitcase nuke props from the show. In the United Kingdom, the scene where Elizabeth II commits suicide drew controversy.
