= Imaginationland =

Logo for Imaginationland: The Movie

South Park: Imaginationland, or Imaginationland: The Movie, are the three episodes merged into a compilation-film. The movie is uncensored and includes previously-unreleased footage. It was released direct-to-video on March 11, 2008, in the United States and a year later in the United Kingdom on May 25. A few months later the movie was released for free online as a streaming video.

Having a theme of good versus evil, the compilation movie (or the trilogy story arc) parodies fairy tales, fantasy- and horror-films, and includes their affiliated superheroes, supervillains, and legendary creatures. Being a social satire of events, the movie also lampoons the American military, American politics, film-directors, hippie culture, and the mass-media regarding terrorism.

== Episode I ==
"Imaginationland"
- South Park episode
- Episode no.: Season 11; Episode 10
- Directed by: Trey Parker
- Written by: Trey Parker
- Production code: 1110
- Original air date: October 17, 2007

Guest appearance
- Jonathan Kimmel as The Scottish Dragon

Episode chronology
← Previous "More Crap"	Next → "Imaginationland Episode II"
- South Park season 11

"Imaginationland Episode I" is the tenth episode of the eleventh season and the 163rd overall episode of the American animated television series South Park. It premiered on Comedy Central in the United States on October 17, 2007. The episode was rated TV-MA LV in the United States. It is the first episode in a three-part story arc that won the 2008 Emmy for "Outstanding Animated Program (For Programming One Hour or More)". The three episodes were later reissued together, along with previously unreleased footage, as the uncensored Imaginationland: The Movie.

In the episode, Cartman swears that he has seen a leprechaun. Then, Stan and Kyle visit "Imaginationland", a land with imaginary beings.

=== Plot summary ===
The episode begins with Cartman directing the other boys through a forest in search of a leprechaun. A skeptical Kyle makes a bet that if Cartman can prove leprechauns exist, Kyle will suck Cartman's balls, but if not, Cartman will owe Kyle $10. To Kyle's shock, they find a leprechaun and chase after it. They eventually catch it in a trap.

The leprechaun says he was sent to warn of a terrorist attack, and that being chased by the boys has made him late, before vanishing. A triumphant Cartman declares that Kyle must suck his balls, but Kyle initially refuses, asking why a leprechaun would be warning of a terrorist attack and insisting that there has to be a logical explanation. The next day, as Kyle is conversing with Stan, Kenny, Jimmy and Butters, a strange man suddenly appears, asking them if they have seen the leprechaun. When Kyle argues that leprechauns are just imaginary, the man tells him that just because something is imaginary does not mean it is not real. He then invites the boys for a ride in his magical "Imagination Flying Machine" while he serenades them with "The Imagination Song".

The group arrives in a place called Imaginationland, where all the beings created by human imagination reside. The imaginary creatures are all fascinated by the presence of "creators", and ask them about the leprechaun. At that moment a band of Islamist terrorists suddenly appear and set off a series of bombs, which kill hundreds of the imaginary creatures and destroy most of the city, with Stan watching. The boys flee on the back of Draco who flies them to safety. Butters, however, gets left behind, and he and the surviving imaginary characters are taken hostage by the terrorists. The next morning, Kyle wakes up in his bed, and is at first sure the whole thing might have been a dream — until he calls Stan who tells him the same story. They also discover that Butters is missing, much to his parents' shock.

Meanwhile, Cartman, angry that Kyle has refused to fulfill his part of their agreement, takes Kyle to court, where the judge sees the contract Kyle signed and orders Kyle to suck Cartman's balls within twenty-four hours or he will be arrested. The United States Department of Defense has received a video from the terrorists, which shows they are holding the survivors of the attack hostage, including Butters. Butters reads a note from the terrorists at gunpoint, and cries out to Stan and Kyle as the video ends. Unsure of how to counter the terrorists, the government officials turn to Hollywood, hoping that they can use their creativity to get ideas. After being disappointed by several directors, including M. Night Shyamalan, who could only come up with twist endings, and Michael Bay, who could only come up with special effects sequences, they seek the advice of Mel Gibson, who suggests that they examine the video the terrorists sent and determine if there is anyone in it that somehow does not fit. The officials at the Pentagon immediately perform a background check on the video and realize that Butters is not an imaginary character. The general orders his men to locate both Stan and Kyle.

In Imaginationland, the terrorists take one of the creatures, "Rockety Rocket", and launch him at "the Barrier", the wall that separates the good and evil halves of Imaginationland. Despite Butters' attempts to stop them, the terrorists destroy the wall and unleash the evil imaginary creatures. Cartman, meanwhile, dons a Sultan's robe and throws a huge party, during which the other kids will watch Kyle suck his balls. Kyle has resigned himself to the task, and is about to walk into Cartman's house with Stan when members of the military arrive and take them away for questioning about Imaginationland. Cartman screams in anger about his plan being foiled, then quickly leaves home and hitchhikes with a trucker to Washington, D.C., to force Kyle to fulfill his end of the bet. He ends the episode stating, "Make no mistake, Kyle. Before this is over, you will suck my balls."

=== Production ===
Production for the episode began in July 2007, nearly three months before the final airing. This was uncharacteristic for South Park, as most episodes are produced in one week or less. The original intention was to make the story into a feature-length film, created as a theatrically released sequel to South Park: Bigger, Longer & Uncut, but there were myriad factors that led it to becoming a regular episode: they did not feel it was a "big" enough idea, the usage of licensed characters made it feel derivative and the driving schedule of producing new episodes contributed to its adoption as a mid-season show.

On the Monday preceding this episode's broadcast, Parker decided to make the episode a trilogy. Stone felt it fun to create a three-parter, as many television dramas at that time—24, Lost—were based on serialization. The day after "Imaginationland Episode I" aired, Parker completed the rest of the trilogy's story in a swift fashion: "I remember that Thursday morning writing every beat of the show on the board. It was the first time on a Thursday I stepped back from the board and the whole show was there. It felt so good."

Shortly after "Imaginationland" was originally broadcast, the site also featured T-shirts and hooded sweatshirts based on the episode. It featured Butters in a floating bubble, asking "Do I have to be the key?"

=== Reception and release ===
Episode I had over 3.4 million viewers and was the most watched program in all of television for Wednesday night among men between ages 18-24 and 34-49 and ranked #1 in cable among persons 18-49.

IGN gave the episode a rating of 9.1/10 and praised it for being "smart, inventive, and provides a number of moments that'll stick with you long after it's over". 411Mania also gave the show a positive review, calling it "a great episode", praising it as an improvement over what the site perceived to be two weak episodes, and awarding it 7/10. TV Squad also gave a positive review saying that "They're still on a roll with another great episode." Josh Modell of The A.V. Club gave the trilogy a B grade, criticizing the slow pace of the main plot and calling it "more like an excuse for a nostalgia trip than a good arc." However, he praised Cartman's endless pursuit of his bet with Kyle and the return of the Christmas critters, calling their appearance, "some of the funniest moments in South Park's recent history,"

The "Imaginationland" trilogy won the Primetime Emmy Award for Outstanding Animated Program (for Programming One Hour or More).

"Imaginationland Episode I", along with the thirteen other episodes from South Park's eleventh season, were released on a three-disc DVD set in the United States on August 12, 2008. The set includes brief audio commentaries by Parker and Stone for each episode.

== Episode II ==
"Imaginationland"
- South Park episode
- Episode no.: Season 11; Episode 11
- Directed by: Trey Parker
- Written by: Trey Parker
- Production code: 1111
- Original air date: October 24, 2007

Episode chronology
← Previous "Imaginationland Episode I"	Next → "Imaginationland Episode III"
- South Park season 11

"Imaginationland Episode II" is the eleventh episode in the eleventh season of Comedy Central's animated television series South Park. It originally aired on October 24, 2007. The episode was rated TV-MA LV in the United States. It is the second episode in a three-part story arc that won the 2008 Emmy for Outstanding Animated Program (For Programming One Hour or More). The three episodes were later reissued together, along with previously unreleased footage, as the uncensored Imaginationland: The Movie.

In the episode, Stan and Kyle are captured by the government, and are being held in the Pentagon until they tell them how they got into Imaginationland. Meanwhile, Cartman is on a deranged quest: Find Kyle and have him make good on their bet.

=== Plot ===
Butters awakens from his dream where he's home to see that he is still in Imaginationland. A variety of evil creatures burst through the destroyed wall and kill the terrorists who freed them before turning to attack the good creatures. The Mayor urges everyone to flee before he himself is impaled by a Xenomorph. Meanwhile, Cartman has a dream concerning his frustration with Kyle not sucking his testicles, per the conditions of a bet between them that Cartman won.

Butters, the Lollipop King and Snarf from ThunderCats flee through the forest and observe the evil characters torturing and mutilating Strawberry Shortcake. As they discuss her fate, the Woodland Christmas Critters from Cartman's Christmas story appear, suggesting worse forms of torment. They propose forcing her to eat her gouged-out eye, and then giving her AIDS by having someone infected with the disease urinate in her eye socket, before raping and killing her, to the other evil characters' shock. Not knowing of anyone so infected among their number, they set off to find someone with AIDS in the forest.

Meanwhile, Kyle and Stan are interrogated at The Pentagon. They are told of a portal into Imaginationland that had been built during the Cold War and is controlled by the government. It is discovered that the portal powers up when the boys, after trial and error, correctly sing the "Imagination" song that the Mayor sang in the previous episode. The Pentagon decides to send a group of soldiers into Imaginationland, led by Kurt Russell, since his appearance in the film Stargate gives him more experience than anyone else. Before the troops are sent, Cartman breaks into the Pentagon in order for Kyle to suck his balls, as per their bet. After Russell and his troop cross the portal, they encounter the Woodland Critters, who gang rape and kill the soldiers. The resulting emergency alert interrupts Kyle and Cartman before they can carry out the terms of the bet. Then, ManBearPig breaks through the portal into the Pentagon causing havoc before a Pentagon employee manages to reverse the portal, sending ManBearPig back into it, but it sucks Stan through as well, and the energy electrocutes Kyle, leaving him seemingly dead on the portal room floor, but he is revived by Cartman using CPR, though his reasons for doing so are selfishly motivated, purely so Kyle can't "weasel out" of having to suck his balls.

In Imaginationland, Butters arrives at Castle Sunshine and is brought before the Council of Nine, consisting of Aslan, Gandalf, Glinda, Luke Skywalker, Morpheus, Popeye, Wonder Woman, Jesus and Zeus. The council determine that Butters is "the key" to taking back Imaginationland from the evil characters, despite Butters' protestations.

Back in the Pentagon, the general, seeing that their "imaginations have run wild", orders for a nuclear missile to be launched through the portal. At the hospital, Kyle awakens from his coma to find Cartman at his bedside, pleased that Kyle is now free to make good on their bet.

=== Reception and release ===
IGN gave the episode a rating of 7.9/10 saying that the "episode definitely feels like the 2nd part of a trilogy that should have been two parts". Josh Modell of The A.V. Club gave the trilogy a B grade, criticizing the slow pace of the main plot and calling it "more like an excuse for a nostalgia trip than a good arc." However, he praised Cartman's endless pursuit of his bet with Kyle and the return of the Christmas critters, calling their appearance, "some of the funniest moments in South Park's recent history".

The Imaginationland Trilogy won the Primetime Emmy Award for Outstanding Animated Program (for Programming One Hour or More).

"Imaginationland Episode II", along with the thirteen other episodes from South Park's eleventh season, were released on a three-disc DVD set in the United States on August 12, 2008. The set includes brief audio commentaries by Parker and Stone for each episode. The entire trilogy was released as a standalone film titled Imaginationland: The Movie.

== Episode III ==
"Imaginationland"
- South Park episode
- Episode no.: Season 11; Episode 12
- Directed by: Trey Parker
- Written by: Trey Parker
- Production code: 1112
- Original air date: October 31, 2007

Episode chronology
← Previous "Imaginationland Episode II"	Next → "Guitar Queer-O"
- South Park season 11

"Imaginationland Episode III" is the twelfth episode in the eleventh season of Comedy Central's animated television series South Park. It originally aired on October 31, 2007. The episode was rated TV-MA LV in the United States. It is the third and final episode in a three-part story arc that won the 2008 Emmy for Outstanding Animated Program (For Programming One Hour or More). The three episodes were later reissued together, along with previously unreleased footage, as the uncensored Imaginationland: The Movie.

In the episode, Stan and Butters engage in the battle of their lives as they fight the army of evil imaginary forces. Meanwhile, Cartman remains determined to get Kyle, and do good for his bet.

=== Plot ===
In the conclusion from the previous two episodes, in which terrorists attacked the embodiment of human imagination, Imaginationland, and destroyed the barrier within that realm separating evil fictional characters from the good innocent ones, the armies of evil characters march towards Castle Sunshine, where the last surviving good fictional characters have taken refuge. There, Butters Stotch has been informed that he is the key to repelling the evil hordes because, as a real person, he has the power to conjure up good characters from his imagination to fight the evil army approaching Castle Sunshine.

Meanwhile, in the real world, Al Gore, who has previously attempted to warn the public of the danger of ManBearPig, shows his staff the video made of that creature's appearance at The Pentagon in the previous episode, and embarks on an investigation of those events on behalf of the American people.

Kyle Broflovski awakens from his coma to see that Eric Cartman is making preparations in anticipation of Kyle sucking his testicles, completely ignoring the Imaginationland crisis and setting up a photo-shoot. Kyle finds that he has a telepathic link to Stan in Imaginationland, who alerts him to the events transpiring in that realm, where the good characters, outnumbered and largely untrained for combat, charge the evil army.

After Al Gore leaks the ManBearPig video to the public, The Pentagon informs the public of the recent events in Imaginationland and their plans to attack that realm with a nuclear weapon, setting off a public and legal controversy over whether the federal government has the jurisdiction to do this. Legal pundits discuss the state court case stemming from Cartman and Kyle's bet, Cartman v. Broflovski, which ruled that imaginary characters are indeed real, which would preclude the government from taking action against the public's imagination.

On the battlefield, the good characters seem doomed. Led by Jesus, the good characters charge, but they are suffering from many casualties. Aslan orders Butters he must imagine Santa which Butters imagines, yet this version is a monstrous cephalopod creature. Butters is terrified and it abruptly fades away. However, Butters manages to master his conjuring ability, and summons appropriate forces that join the battle, and turn the tide in good's favor by focusing and imaging on the good.

The Supreme Court overturns the Cartman v. Broflovski decision that imaginary creatures are real – imaginary creatures are declared to not really be real, so the government can bomb Imaginationland. Kyle is no longer legally required to suck Cartman's testicles, and he is instructed by Stan to stall the launch.

Kyle and Cartman break into the Pentagon again and Kyle, who finally agrees with him and convinces the officials to not bomb Imaginationland by arguing that imaginary creatures are just as real as real people because of the impact they have on people's lives. Cartman responds by telling Kyle that since imaginary creatures are real after all, then he loses their bet, and still has to suck Cartman's testicles. Kyle finally snaps and berates Cartman for not caring about the danger Stan and Butters are in just because of a stupid bet and that he doesn't care who won, because Kyle would rather go to jail than humiliate himself by sucking Cartman's testicles. Shocked that the missile launch is being abruptly cancelled, Al Gore saying, "ManBearPig has to die", launches the bomb himself, causing the portal to destabilize and sucks everyone in the room, as well as the nuclear missile, into Imaginationland.

The good characters' victory is interrupted by the missile's explosion, destroying everything in Imaginationland and killing everyone in it (including the people from the real world), and leaving nothing but a vast white emptiness. Butters survives the explosion and restores the realm with his imagination, back to how it was before the initial terrorist attack. Realizing the power of the realm, Cartman creates duplicates of himself and Kyle, in which imaginary Kyle sucks imaginary Cartman's testicles (off-screen). Kyle angrily states the scene is imaginary, to which Cartman insists that, in one's imagination, imaginary creatures are "real", as Kyle himself said earlier, therefore Kyle's agreement with Cartman is finally fulfilled. The Mayor agrees that at least here in Imaginationland, it is real. Santa then states that it's time for the boys to go home.

Butters suddenly wakes up in the real world, in his bedroom. His parents come in, and he tells them about the dream he just had. They inform Butters that it wasn't a dream, as they read about it in a newspaper, but they proceed to ground him anyway for not coming back from Imaginationland in time to clean out the basement. Enraged by this, Butters tries to use his powers to get out of being grounded, but is told by his parents that his powers only work in Imaginationland, and not in the real world. Disappointed, Butters lies back in bed and ends the episode with a low, unhappy and uncensored mutter of "Aw, shit".

=== Reception and release ===
IGN gave the episode a rating of 8.5/10 calling it "another ambitious effort, with lofty themes, goofy humor and plenty of sequences that just seem to pack jokes and references into every frame". Josh Modell of The A.V. Club gave the trilogy a B grade, criticizing the slow pace of the main plot and calling it "more like an excuse for a nostalgia trip than a good arc." However, he praised Cartman's endless pursuit of his bet with Kyle and the return of the Christmas critters, calling their appearance, "some of the funniest moments in South Park's recent history".

The Imaginationland Trilogy won the Primetime Emmy Award for Outstanding Animated Program (for Programming One Hour or More).

"Imaginationland Episode III", along with the thirteen other episodes from South Park's eleventh season, were released on a three-disc DVD set in the United States on August 12, 2008. The set includes brief audio commentaries by Parker and Stone for each episode. The entire trilogy was released as a standalone film titled Imaginationland: The Movie.

== Cultural references ==
The Mayor of Imaginationland is a pastiche of two characters. Aspects of his appearance and the "Imagination Song" allude to both Dreamfinder from Disney's Journey into Imagination and to Mr. Sophistication from The Killing of a Chinese Bookie.

The scene after the bomb goes off in Imaginationland, silently showing the devastation, is a parody of the beach storming scene in Saving Private Ryan.

The creators used the TV shows 24 and Battlestar Galactica as templates for plotting the structure of the trilogy.

Episode II opens with Cartman intoning "Previously, on Battlestar Galactica", over a still of that show's logo.

The resuscitation scene from James Cameron's The Abyss was referenced in the episode.

The scenes with the portal and Kurt Russell are in reference to the movie Stargate. The General references this when saying "You were in that movie that was kinda like this".

"Sunshine Castle" is reminiscent of Rivendell from The Lord of the Rings fantasy novel series. The battle for Imaginationland parodies the battle at Helms Deep from The Lord of the Rings: The Two Towers and Gandalf appears as one of the imaginary characters. Al Gore when he shows a video of 'man-bear-pig' attacking the army base the dialog echoes directly the Operatives opening lines from Serenity. When Butters reimagines Imaginationland out of the void, this echoes the resurrection of Fantasia by the main character Bastian Bux in The Neverending Story.

== DVD ==
The DVD includes two bonus full-length episodes from previous seasons, "Woodland Critter Christmas" and "ManBearPig", as they feature the imaginary characters that reappeared in this film. Shortly after "Imaginationland" was originally-broadcast, the website featured T-shirts and hooded sweatshirts based on the episode. It featured Butters in a floating bubble, asking "Do I have to be the key?".

== Mobile game ==
A mobile game based on Imaginationland developed by Mr.Goodliving for iOS was released on July 10, 2008.
