= The Death Camp of Tolerance =

- South Park episode
- Episode no.: Season 6 Episode 14
- Directed by: Trey Parker
- Written by: Trey Parker
- Production code: 614
- Original air date: November 20, 2002

Guest appearances
- John Hansen as Mr. Slave

Episode chronology
← Previous "The Return of the Fellowship of the Ring to the Two Towers"	Next → "The Biggest Douche in the Universe"
- South Park season 6

"The Death Camp of Tolerance" is the fourteenth episode of the sixth season of the American animated television series South Park, and the 93rd overall episode of the series. It originally aired on Comedy Central in the United States on November 20, 2002.

In the episode, Mr. Garrison tries to get fired from his new job as the fourth grade teacher at South Park Elementary by being overtly and explicitly homosexual in front of the students, so he can sue the school and get twenty-five million dollars in damages. However, he is unable to as the rest of the faculty and the children's parents are desperate to appear tolerant of his homosexuality. The boys do not share their sentiments, and as punishment for not tolerating Garrison's outrageous behavior, they are sent to a Nazi-esque "tolerance camp." All of the scenes inside the camp are shown in black-and-white, an homage to Schindler's List.

The episode was written by series co-creator Trey Parker and is rated TV-MA in the United States. The Daily Telegraph has referred to it as one of the series' strongest episodes.

== Plot ==
Upon being promoted to teaching fourth graders, Mr. Garrison learns that getting fired for being homosexual could allow him to sue the school for millions of dollars. He decides to perform outrageous sex acts in the classroom when he takes over for Mr. Mackey, hiring his new partner Mr. Slave as his teaching assistant. Although the boys complain about Garrison's inappropriate activities, their parents mistakenly think their boys are intolerant of homosexuality. Because of that, the adults bring the boys to the Museum of Tolerance to learn about tolerance of minorities or those with different life choices, though they hypocritically attack a nearby smoker with verbal abuse. Garrison, annoyed that no one has complained about his actions, steps up his campaign to get fired by shoving Lemmiwinks, the class gerbil, into Mr. Slave's rectum, an act called gerbilling.

The boys mention their discomfort to Chef, the only adult who believes them, who in turn reports Garrison's actions to Principal Victoria, but ends up being sent to a "tolerance seminar". Stan, Kyle, Cartman (who still has Kenny's soul trapped inside him) and Butters refuse to attend class, so their parents send them to an Auschwitz-like "tolerance camp" (it is unclear if this is the same camp that Chef was sent to) which uses arts and crafts such as finger painting and painful labor to teach children tolerance, under the eyes of the camp warden. Back at the Museum of Tolerance, Garrison is to receive the "Courageous Teacher Award" for overcoming adversity. Still frustrated at not being fired, Garrison goes all out at the ceremony in an extremely flamboyant and stereotypically gay manner, riding Mr. Slave like a horse and humming Ferde Grofé's "On the Trail" from the Grand Canyon Suite. Although the parents finally understand what their kids were telling them about and are indeed shocked at Garrison's behavior, they still cannot bring themselves to criticize it, as they fear being branded "intolerant". When the people continue to call Garrison and Mr. Slave "courageous" for their actions, Garrison finally breaks down and tells them he is trying to get fired. He goes on to say that being tolerant does not mean one should enable inappropriate behavior and begs to be fired so that he can collect on a discrimination lawsuit, but Principal Victoria says that she has a "better idea".

The parents hurry to collect their malnourished and emaciated kids from the tolerance camp, but still fail to realize that they tried to tell them about Garrison's behavior. Principal Victoria concludes that Garrison and Mr. Slave are intolerant of their own sexual identities, and reveals that her "better idea" is to send them to the tolerance camp so that they will accept themselves. As the outside events occur, Lemmiwinks traverses the regions of Mr. Slave's digestive system, receiving advice from three animal spirits – the Frog King, Sparrow Prince and Catatafish. The journey is accompanied by songs that parody those used in the 1977 Rankin/Bass version of The Hobbit. As Mr. Slave arrives at the tolerance camp, he coughs up Lemmiwinks. The spirits, now free from Mr. Slave's gut, appear before Lemmiwinks and crown him "The Gerbil King". He exits the scene with the "Ballad of Lemmiwinks" playing over the credits.

== Production ==
"The Death Camp of Tolerance" was written and directed by series co-creator Trey Parker. By this point in the series' sixth season, the show had followed a story arc involving the death of Kenny ("Kenny Dies"), and several other tangents, among those Mr. Garrison's move to teaching kindergarten. Parker and co-creator Matt Stone began their attempts to return the show to normalcy, with Mr. Garrison's return to being the children's teacher in this episode.

The staff at the studio found the subplot involving the Lemmiwinks ridiculous; Parker recalled watching an animatic and him and Stone being the only ones laughing, while the others sat and stared. The animation crew viewed the sequences as temporary, until Parker informed them that they would be in the final episode. Although few besides the creators found the episode humorous during production, Stone later recalled receiving calls from friends who found the subplot funny, while also remarking, "That's the most fucked up thing I’ve ever seen." The character and plot line originated as a spoof of The Lord of the Rings and its primary protagonist, Frodo Baggins, whom Parker and Stone found a very ineffective and pointless main character. Lemmiwinks was originally a squirrel in a possible live-action Lord of the Rings parody the duo scrapped. Despite this, a mention of a fictitious program revolving around the Lemmiwinks was mentioned in a 2001 episode of the duo's live action series That's My Bush!.

The character of Mr. Slave, who is introduced in this episode, is the voice of South Park staffer John Hansen. The voice originated in conversations with Parker and Stone as an arbitrary, stereotypical homosexual voice.

== Reception ==
In 2010, The Daily Telegraph mentioned the episode as a moment in which the series solidified its form, writing, "The episode contains all the ingredients that have helped to transform South Park into the funniest, cleverest, most corrosive and watchable satire on television." According to the paper, "some fans still regard [it] as the greatest episode."

Lemmiwinks, alongside The Frog King, The Sparrow Prince and The Catatafish, later appear in the fifteenth season episode "Bass to Mouth" (2011) as well as the 2014 video game South Park: The Stick of Truth.

== See also ==
- Paradox of tolerance
- "Stupid Spoiled Whore Video Playset"
- "Bass to Mouth"
