= The New Terrance and Phillip Movie Trailer =

- South Park episode
- Episode no.: Season 6 Episode 5
- Directed by: Trey Parker
- Written by: Trey Parker
- Production code: 605
- Original air date: April 3, 2002

Episode chronology
← Previous "Fun with Veal"	Next → "Professor Chaos"
- South Park season 6

"The New Terrance and Phillip Movie Trailer" is the fifth episode of the sixth season of South Park and the 84th episode of the series overall. It originally aired on April 3, 2002. The episode parodies actor Russell Crowe's real-life altercations. In the episode, the boys must watch his show in order to see a trailer for an upcoming Terrance and Phillip movie. However, bad luck forces them to race across town searching for a working TV.

== Plot ==
Stan, Kyle, Cartman and Butters are at Stan's house to see Fightin' Around the World with Russell Crowe. The boys do not actually care about the show, but watch it solely to see the new Terrance and Phillip movie trailer, which will premiere during one of the show's commercial breaks. Shelly, Stan's aggressive older sister, being on her period, only allows them to watch if they bring her some tampons; the boys send out Butters to get some. Cartman thinks the TV's color is "saturated" and attempts to fix a loose cable, causing the TV to explode. After Butters returns, the boys leave to watch at Kyle's house, forcing his little brother Ike away from the TV. Their father, Gerald, reprimands Kyle for not letting Ike watch the MacNeil/Lehrer Report, forcing the boys to find another place to watch the show.

Throughout the episode, several parts of Fightin' Around the World with Russell Crowe are shown. This "children's show" depicts Crowe as a muscular sailor with an exaggerated Australian accent who randomly beats people up. He sails the world with Tugger, his anthropomorphic tugboat who communicates with Crowe by blowing his whistle, and who Crowe considers his best friend. Throughout the show, Crowe and Tugger visit several places, including Tiananmen Square in China and Brooklyn in New York City. Crowe describes the locals there in a wildlife documentary style similar to such shows as The Crocodile Hunter and Man vs. Wild, then proceeds to pick fights with them. At one point, Crowe also attacks the show's editor for cutting one of the fighting scenes short. Later on, Crowe sings Tugger a song from his new album, accompanying himself on his acoustic guitar. The song is so horrible that it drives Tugger to attempt suicide. He is brought to the hospital and makes a full recovery. While there, Crowe pledges to take up a cause: "fighting cancer". He then beats up a patient with cancer.

The boys discuss where they can find a television to watch the commercial breaks on. Cartman's house is being fumigated and Butters insists they cannot go to his house, so they go to Chef to watch on his new, hyper-modern plasma screen TV. To their disappointment, the trailer is not shown during the first commercial break. When Chef tries to demonstrate some of the functionalities of his new TV, he accidentally transforms it into an ED-209-like robot, which goes on a rampage through South Park. During the remainder of the episode, Chef follows the destructive television around while talking to customer service on his cellphone in an effort to deprogram the machine. The boys go to watch TV at the local bar, only to be kicked out for being underage. They then arrive at Shady Acres, South Park's retirement home, where they manage to catch the second commercial break, but the trailer is again not aired. The elderly grow annoyed with the boys and force them out by simultaneously releasing their bowels.

In desperation, they try to brave the fumes at Cartman's house, but this proves unbearable. The boys decide to head back to Stan's house to use an old black-and-white television which Stan remembers having. Upon arriving at the front door, Butters realizes he never gave Shelly her tampons. Before they can enter the house, they are washed away by a large tidal wave of Shelly's menstrual blood. The boys then resort to watching TV with a group of crack-addicted homeless people, only to be attacked by Chef's rampaging television-robot which blasts away the device. With nowhere else to go, the boys ask Butters why they cannot watch at his house. Butters explains that his parents are out of town and he does not have a babysitter. Stunned for a few seconds and enraged by this revelation, they hurriedly rush to Butters' house (with Stan saying: "We'll kill Butters later!"), arriving just in time to view the last commercial break, wherein the trailer is finally shown. The trailer is anticlimactic: it features a textual announcement in the form of words flying at the screen, followed by a few seconds of Terrance and Phillip at a ranch wearing cowboy hats and farting. It shows almost nothing of the actual film. Nevertheless, the boys are ecstatic over finally getting to see the trailer after all.

Meanwhile, Chef is still on the phone with the customer service line, unsuccessfully trying to stop his killer TV.

== Inspiration and production ==
In 1999 and 2002, Russell Crowe was involved in three public altercations, which are spoofed in the South Park episode. In 1999, Crowe was part of a midnight brawl with multiple people outside a bar in Coffs Harbour, Australia, which was caught on security camera. In 2002, Crowe fought with businessman Eric Watson inside Zuma, a Japanese restaurant in London. Actor Ross Kemp leaped in to separate the two. During the 2002 BAFTA awards, Crowe quoted a poem by Patrick Kavanagh during his acceptance speech of the award for his performance in A Beautiful Mind. Upon broadcast, the poem was cut out due to time constraints and copyright issues. This angered Crowe and led to a confrontation between him and producer Malcolm Gerrie, during which Crowe was "abusive" and "behaving unreasonably". The South Park episode contains a reference to this incident during the scene in which Crowe attacks his editor, saying, "My fighting is poetry! You don't edit Russell Crowe's poetry, you testicle!"

In the DVD commentary for the episode, Trey Parker noted that, by 2002, Crowe had gotten himself into fights on three different continents, which led to the idea of Fightin' Around the World with Russell Crowe. Parker said that the initial inspiration for the episode, however, came from a personal experience he and Matt Stone had with the actor. Parker and Stone became acquainted with Crowe at an award show around the time that the duo got awards for Bigger, Longer & Uncut. They described Crowe as "a really cool guy" accompanied by easy-going "Aussie" friends. One day, the two were invited to a studio by Crowe, who was finishing his album and asked the duo to listen to it and provide feedback. Flattered, they accepted the invitation. However, when they arrived, about eight of Crowe's acquaintances were also there. Crowe then proceeded to play a CD of the album, which seemed completely mixed and finished already. No one in the room seemed willing to comment on the songs, and it soon became apparent to Parker and Stone that Crowe simply wanted everyone to sit there and listen to the album. Parker said that while Crowe was "a very talented actor," he was a poor musician, describing his record as "Bon Jovi meets Hepatitis B." At one point, a song came along which featured handclapping. Parker, trying to think of something constructive to say, suggested that Crowe mix out the handclaps. "And literally, the place just got quiet," Parker said, with all attendees supposedly in shock that Parker would dare to critique Crowe. According to Parker, Crowe then nonchalantly took a drag of his cigarette and said, "Well, maybe I'll mix them off the version I give to you."

After the album was finally over, Robbie Robertson showed up at the studio, and Crowe started the album all over again. Exhausted and unwilling to listen to the album a second time, the duo got up and left. Despite this uncomfortable incident with him, Parker and Stone stated that there were no hostile feelings between them and Crowe, describing him as generally kind to them and reiterating that he was "an extremely talented actor". They remained on good terms, with Crowe even writing the duo a letter to congratulate them on the success of their movie Team America: World Police in 2004.

In July 2005, three years after the episode first aired, Crowe was involved in a highly publicized incident in which he was arrested for throwing a telephone at a concierge of the Mercer Hotel in New York City. The event reinforced his reputation for having a short fuse.

"The New Terrance and Phillip Movie Trailer" is the only South Park episode to take place in real time, i.e. the fictional events in it take up just as much time as the episode lasts. Even the beginnings and the endings of the commercial breaks of the Russell Crowe show within the episode's universe coincide with the actual commercial breaks of the South Park show in real life.

== Home media ==
"The New Terrance and Phillip Movie Trailer," along with the other 16 episodes from the sixth season, were put on a three-disc DVD set called South Park: the Complete Sixth Season, which was released in the United States on October 11, 2005. The set includes brief audio commentaries by Parker and Stone for each episode. IGN gave the season a rating of 9/10.
