= Professor Chaos =

- South Park episode
- Episode no.: Season 6 Episode 6
- Directed by: Trey Parker
- Written by: Trey Parker
- Production code: 606
- Original air date: April 10, 2002

Episode chronology
← Previous "The New Terrance and Phillip Movie Trailer"	Next → "Simpsons Already Did It"
- South Park season 6

"Professor Chaos" is the sixth episode of the sixth season of the Comedy Central series South Park and the 85th episode of the series overall. It originally aired on April 10, 2002. In the episode, the boys hold a contest to try to find a replacement for Butters, who becomes a supervillain after being fired from the group as the replacement Kenny. The episode also parodies The Bachelor.

The episode was written by series co-creator Trey Parker and is rated TV-MA in the United States, except on syndication and post-2017 reruns on Comedy Central, where the episode is rated TV-14 instead.

== Plot ==
After Kenny's semi-permanent death near the end of Season 5, Butters became the replacement Kenny, until this episode, where he is fired for simply being too lame. Stan, Kyle and Cartman hold a competition to find a new fourth friend while Butters, feeling rejected and angry at the world, creates an alternate personality, Professor Chaos, and sets off to spread discord among the world. He does minor things like swapping two soup meals at a Bennigan's restaurant, and stealing erasers from Ms. Choksondik during class.

The boys gather twenty local kids to compete for their friendship, and set up the contest to be like a reality TV show where they show scenes of interactions and show private individual comments. One of the early losers, a boy named Dougie, winds up joining Butters and his "minions" (Butters' pet hamsters) as Professor Chaos's sidekick, General Disarray. Together they try to flood the world using a garden hose, but this is thwarted when the water department cuts off the water to his house after only flooding the backyard. The two then resort to spraying aerosol cans into the air to destroy the atmosphere.

While Professor Chaos and General Disarray try to destroy the planet, Kyle, Stan, and Cartman pick six finalists to be their friend: Token, Timmy, Jimmy, Tweek, Towelie, and Pip. They first eliminate Pip during a baseball game when he asked for tea and crumpets. They then decide that Token is a smartass (Kyle points out that Cartman is also a smartass, but Cartman retorts with "Do we really need another one?"), Timmy can be too self-centered (likely a reference to the fact that Timmy is only able to say his own name with few exceptions), Towelie gets too high to be relied on for anything, and Jimmy is a suck-up (while they are deciding, Jimmy gives them a large gift basket with candy and games inside, and a large badge that reads "Best Friends 4 Ever").

The decision cuts off into a cliffhanger, where a narrator asks three questions: "Will Professor Chaos' latest plot succeed and be the final undoing of Earth? Which boy has been chosen as the replacement for Kenny? And which of these South Park residents (Chef, Mr. Garrison, Jimbo, Officer Barbrady, Ms. Choksondik, and Mayor McDaniels) was killed and will never be seen again?" However, the questions are immediately answered: "No, Tweek, Ms. Choksondik."

== Production ==
Selecting the "new friend candidates" using a rose is a parody of the TV show The Bachelor. Most of the episode was written without any specific idea of who the fourth friend would be.

== Home media ==
"Professor Chaos," along with the sixteen other episodes from South Park's sixth season, were released on a three-disc DVD set in the United States on October 11, 2005. The set includes brief audio commentaries by Parker and Stone for each episode. IGN gave the season a rating of 9/10. The episode was also released on the two-disc DVD collection A Little Box of Butters.
