= List of South Park cast members =

South Park is an American animated sitcom created by Trey Parker and Matt Stone who also do the majority of the voices. Both Parker and Stone do most of the male characters on the show along with April Stewart and Mona Marshall, who do the female characters on the show. Guest stars have lent their voices to the show including Jay Leno, George Clooney, Jennifer Aniston, Bill Hader, Robert Smith and the comedy duo Cheech & Chong voiced characters representing their likenesses for the season four (2000) episode "Cherokee Hair Tampons", which was the duo's first collaborative effort in 20 years. The entirety of the Nu-Metal band Korn also provided their voices and likenesses in the season three episode "Korn's Groovy Pirate Ghost Mystery".Characters in the show, according to Parker and Stone, are inspired by people they met when they were kids. Stan Marsh is made based on Parker himself while Kyle Broflovski is based on Stone himself. Eric Cartman is partially named after and based on Matt Karpman, a high school classmate of Parker who remains a friend of both Parker and Stone. Cartman is also inspired by All in the Family patriarch Archie Bunker, of whom Parker and Stone are fans. They state that creating Cartman as a "little eight-year-old fat kid" made it easier for the two to portray a Bunker-like character after the introduction of political correctness to late-20th century television. Kenny McCormick was based on the creator's observation that most groups of childhood friends in small middle-class towns always included "the one poor kid" and decided to portray Kenny in this light. Butters Stotch is loosely based on South Park co-producer Eric Stough.

== Current cast ==
Parker and Stone voice most of the male South Park characters. Mary Kay Bergman voiced the majority of the female characters until her suicide on November 11, 1999. Mona Marshall and Eliza Schneider succeeded Bergman in 2000, with Schneider leaving the show after its seventh season (2003). She was replaced by April Stewart, who, along with Marshall, continues to voice most of the female characters. Bergman was originally listed in the credits under the alias Shannen Cassidy to protect her reputation as the voice of several Disney and other kid-friendly characters. Stewart was originally credited under the name Gracie Lazar, while Schneider was sometimes credited under her rock opera performance pseudonym Blue Girl.

Other voice actors and members of South Park's production staff have voiced minor characters for various episodes, while a few staff members voice recurring characters; supervising producer Jennifer Howell voices student Bebe Stevens, storyboard artist Adrien Beard voices the school's only black student, Tolkien Black, producer Vernon Chatman voiced an anthropomorphic towel named Towelie, and supervising producer John Hansen voices Mr. Slave, the former gay lover of Mr. Garrison. Series developer Eric Stough also voices Kenny McCormick "un-muffled", in the few episodes where the character does not wear his trademark parka that normally muffles his voice. Throughout the show's run, the voices for toddler and kindergarten characters have been provided by various small children of the show's production staff.

When voicing child characters, the voice actors speak within their normal vocal range while adding a childlike inflection. The recorded audio is then edited with Pro Tools, and the pitch is altered to make the voice sound more like that of a 10-year-old.

Isaac Hayes voiced the character of Chef, a black, soul-singing cafeteria worker who was one of the few adults the boys consistently trusted. Hayes agreed to voice the character after being among Parker and Stone's ideal candidates which also included Lou Rawls and Barry White. Hayes, who lived and hosted a radio show in New York during his tenure with South Park, would record his dialogue on a digital audio tape while a respective episode's director would give directions over the phone, then the tape would be shipped to the show's production studio in California. After Hayes left the show in early 2006, the character of Chef was killed off in the season 10 (2006) premiere "The Return of Chef".

=== Guest stars ===
Celebrities who appear on the show are usually impersonated, though some celebrities lend their voice to their characters. Celebrities who have voiced themselves include Michael Buffer, Brent Musburger, Jay Leno, Robert Smith, and the bands Radiohead and Korn. Comedy team Cheech & Chong voiced characters representing their likenesses for the season four (2000) episode "Cherokee Hair Tampons", which was the duo's first collaborative effort in 20 years. Malcolm McDowell appears in live-action sequences as the narrator of the season four episode "Pip".

Jennifer Aniston, Richard Belzer, Natasha Henstridge, Norman Lear, and Peter Serafinowicz have guest starred as other speaking characters. During South Park's earliest seasons, several high-profile celebrities inquired about guest-starring on the show. As a joke, Parker and Stone responded by offering low-profile, non-speaking roles, most of which were accepted; George Clooney provided the barks for Stan's dog Sparky in the season one (1997) episode "Big Gay Al's Big Gay Boat Ride", Leno provided the meows for Cartman's cat in the season one finale "Cartman's Mom Is a Dirty Slut", and Henry Winkler voiced the various growls and grunts of a kid-eating monster in the season two (1998) episode "City on the Edge of Forever". Jerry Seinfeld offered to lend his voice for the Thanksgiving episode "Starvin' Marvin", but declined to appear when he was only offered a role as "Turkey #4".

=== Trey Parker ===
Trey Parker voices four of the main characters: Stan Marsh, Eric Cartman, Randy Marsh and Mr. Garrison. He also provides the voices of several recurring characters, such as Clyde Donovan, Mr. Hankey, Mr. Mackey, Stephen Stotch, Jimmy Valmer, Timmy Burch, Tuong Lu Kim and Phillip.

=== Matt Stone ===
Matt Stone voices three of the main characters: Kyle Broflovski, Kenny McCormick and Butters Stotch. He also provides the voices of several recurring characters, such as Gerald Broflovski, Stuart McCormick, Craig Tucker, Jimbo Kern, Terrance, Saddam Hussein, Tweek Tweak, Mr. Adler and Jesus.

=== Mona Marshall ===
Mona Marshall voices Sheila Broflovski, Linda Stotch, and Yentl Cartman.

=== April Stewart ===
April Stewart voices Liane Cartman, Sharon Marsh, Carol McCormick, Shelly Marsh, Mayor McDaniels, Principal Victoria and Wendy Testaburger.

== List ==
Actor	Character(s)	
Trey Parker	Stan Marsh	Eric Cartman
Trey Parker	Randy Marsh	Mr. Garrison
Trey Parker	Grampa Marsh	Clyde Donovan
Trey Parker	Timmy Burch	Jimmy Valmer
Trey Parker	Ned Gerblansky	Dr. Alphonse Mephesto and Kevin
Trey Parker	Santa Claus	Mr. Hankey
Trey Parker	Mr. Mackey	Stephen Stotch
Trey Parker	Officer Barbrady	Richard Tweak
Trey Parker	Tuong Lu Kim	Phillip
Trey Parker	PC Principal	Skeeter
Trey Parker	Satan	Ms. Choksondik (2000–2002)
Trey Parker	JD Vance (2025–Present)	Peter Thiel (2025)
Trey Parker	Kristi Noem (2025)	Pete Hegseth (2025–Present)
Matt Stone	Kyle Broflovski	Kenny McCormick
Matt Stone	Butters Stotch	Gerald Broflovski
Matt Stone	Craig Tucker	Tweek Tweak
Matt Stone	Stuart McCormick	Jimbo Kern
Matt Stone	Terrance	Scott Malkinson
Matt Stone	Kevin Stoley	Father Maxi
Matt Stone	Jesus Christ	Mr. Adler
Matt Stone	Pip Pirrip (1997–2010)	Saddam Hussein
Matt Stone	Donald Trump (2025–present)	
Mona Marshall	Sheila Broflovski	Linda Stotch
Mona Marshall	Yentl Cartman	
April Stewart	Sharon Marsh	Liane Cartman
April Stewart	Carol McCormick	Shelly Marsh
April Stewart	Mayor McDaniels	Principal Victoria
April Stewart	Wendy Testaburger	Mrs. Tweak
April Stewart	Alpha Air Heather	Mrs. Ross

== Recurring guest voices ==
The recurring guest voices include John Hansen, Vernon Chatman, Adrien Beard and Jennifer Howell.

Actor	Character(s)	Notes
Jennifer Howell	Bebe Stevens	Guest starred in several episodes since season 1
Vernon Chatman	Towelie	Guest starred in several episodes since season 5
Adrien Beard	Tolkien Black	Guest starred in several episodes since season 4
John Hansen	Mr. Slave	Guest starred in several episodes season 6
Jessica Makinson	Heidi Turner Strong Woman Henrietta Biggle	Guest starred in several episodes since season 6
Kimberly Brooks	Nichole Daniels Linda Black Laura Tucker Margaret Nelson (2015–2021) Various characters	Guest starred in several episodes since season 12

== Casting changes ==
Mary Kay Bergman voiced the majority of the female characters until her death on November 11, 1999. Mona Marshall and Eliza Schneider succeeded Bergman in 2000, with Schneider leaving the show after its seventh season (2003). She was replaced by April Stewart, who, along with Marshall, continues to voice most of the female characters. Isaac Hayes, who voiced the character Chef, left the show after Parker and Stone's depiction of his religion Scientology in the episode "Trapped in the Closet".

Actor	Character(s)	Notes
Mary Kay Bergman	Liane Cartman, Sheila Broflovski, Shelly Marsh, Sharon Marsh, Mayor McDaniels, Carol McCormick, Wendy Testaburger, Principal Victoria and Ms. Crabtree	Recast after her death in 1999. The last episode to feature her voice was Mr. Hankey's Christmas Classics.
Eliza Schneider	Liane Cartman, Shelly Marsh, Sharon Marsh, Mayor McDaniels, Carol McCormick, Wendy Testaburger, Principal Victoria and Ms. Crabtree	Schneider replaced Mary Kay Bergman after her death in 1999. Schneider left after the show's seventh season.
Isaac Hayes	Chef	Left after he suffered a stroke. The character appeared again in the first episode of season 10, but his voice consists entirely of older recordings spliced together for comical effect, the character was killed off in the same episode. Hayes died in 2008.

Due to the unusually small cast (majority of characters voiced by Parker and Stone) only Bergman, Schneider, and Hayes have left the cast as aforementioned in 1999, 2003, and 2006 respectively.
