= Freak Strike =

- South Park episode
- Episode no.: Season 6 Episode 3
- Directed by: Trey Parker
- Written by: Trey Parker
- Production code: 601
- Original air date: March 20, 2002

Episode chronology
← Previous "Asspen"	Next → "Fun with Veal"
- South Park season 6

"Freak Strike" is the third episode of the sixth season of the Comedy Central series South Park and the 82nd episode of the series overall. Going by production order, it is the first episode of Season 6 instead of the third episode. It originally aired on March 20, 2002. In the episode, the boys disguise Butters as an individual with testicles on his chin, allowing him to win them a prize on a television show. However, Butters only wins a round of putt-putt golf. The freaks who make a career of appearing on TV talk shows go on strike, and make Butters strike with them.

== Plot ==
The boys are watching Maury, on which several children with bodily defects are shown. A girl born with no midsection wins a gift certificate, so Kyle, Stan, Cartman, and Butters decide to try to get on the show with a faked deformity to win a prize. The group decide that Butters should go on live TV with a scrotum on his chin. Although initially reluctant—only to be guilted by the others that Kenny would have done it, Butters agrees, and the boys enlist a couple of sci-fi geeks to make fake balls to put on Butters.

Butters then flies solo to New York City to appear on the show. In the green room, he meets other variously deformed people, who welcome Butters to their union, which ensures that US TV talk shows interview their members regularly.

On the show, Maury introduces Butters as "Napoleon Bonaparte from South Park." Butters wins a trip to the largest miniature golf course in the world. Stan, Kyle, and Cartman, watching the show at home, are angry that Butters got "their" prize. Cartman calls Maury and tries to get himself on the show. The operator tells him they are not currently interviewing people with deformities, but are trying to find "out of control kids" for a future episode. Cartman convinces his mother to take him on that show and lie that he is out of control.

Butters is grounded by his parents for putting a fake deformity on the Maury show. The freaks strike in protest of Maury's decision to stop interviewing people with deformities, and head to Butters' house to recruit him. Fear of being discovered as a faker leads him to reluctantly go on strike with the group.

Cartman and his mother appear on Maury. Seeing a teenage girl named Vanity's "out of control" behavior, Cartman dresses up as a promiscuous teenage girl to try to win the prize. The deformed people's union hijacks the studio's video screen and broadcasts a plea to the audience. They state that they are the 'true' freaks and they should not lose their means of employment to people who are only freaks because they are "stupid trailer trash from the South". The union members present a music video about looking for the "True Freak Label" on talk shows, and most of the audience agrees and leaves the studio. Maury agrees to negotiate with the deformed people. Irate that Butters once again ruined his chance to win a prize, Cartman rips the fake balls from Butters' chin in front of the union. Surprisingly, the union members believe Cartman physically harmed Butters and pursue him instead. Butters' relief is short-lived, however, as his parents arrive in a taxi, and he knows he is in trouble again.

== Production ==
The "True Freak Label" video sabotage that the freaks make Butters star in is a shot-by-shot parody of the International Ladies' Garment Workers' Union commercial from the '70s, which showed the workers singing a song known as "Look for the Union Label." According to the episode commentary, Parker and Stone were reminded of the commercial when viewing a bootlegged version of the Star Wars Holiday Special, which retained the commercial.

== Home media ==
"Freak Strike," along with the sixteen other episodes from South Park: the Complete Sixth Season, were released on a three-disc DVD set in the United States on October 11, 2005. The sets include brief audio commentaries by Parker and Stone for each episode. IGN gave the season a rating of 9/10.
