= Asspen =

- South Park episode
- Episode no.: Season 6 Episode 2
- Directed by: Trey Parker
- Written by: Trey Parker
- Production code: 603
- Original air date: March 13, 2002

Episode chronology
← Previous "Jared Has Aides"	Next → "Freak Strike"
- South Park season 6

"Asspen" is the second episode of the sixth season and the 81st overall episode of the American animated television series South Park. Going by production order, it is the 3rd episode of Season 6 instead of the 2nd episode. It first aired on Comedy Central in the United States on March 13, 2002. In the episode, the boys go on vacation at Aspen, Colorado, where Stan is repeatedly tormented by an older skier named Tad. Meanwhile, the boys' parents become stuck at a meeting as two salesmen attempt to coax them into purchasing timeshare property.

The episode was written and directed by series co-creator Trey Parker. The episode serves as a parody of underdog sports films from the 1980s and 1990s, while the subplot was conceived while Parker and co-creator Matt Stone were repeatedly annoyed by timeshare salesmen while in Whistler, British Columbia. "Asspen" has received very positive reviews, with critics listing it as among the best episodes of the series. Along with the rest of the sixth season, it was released on home video on October 11, 2005.

== Plot ==
On vacation in Aspen, Colorado, the four boys (Stan, Kyle, Cartman, and Butters) are taking ski lessons from an upbeat instructor named Thumper, when an older and more experienced skier named Tad begins harassing Stan out of nowhere despite having never met him before. Tad demands that Stan race him for "stealing" his girlfriend Heather, whom Stan has also never met before. Stan agrees, fully aware that, since he is a complete amateur, Tad will most certainly beat him. He reluctantly races Tad and loses, as he expected. Afterwards, he is approached by a geeky teenage girl who invites him to a dance at the Aspen Youth Center. There, the boys discover that Tad's father plans to bulldoze the Aspen Youth Center. Tad then appears onstage to sing an off-key song where he repeats "Stan Darsh" over and over until Stan snaps and asks what he wants. Tad demands another race, this time on a much larger hill: the K-13 (a reference to Better Off Dead). It is agreed that if Stan wins, Tad's father will not bulldoze the youth center. It is at this point an epic montage of training occurs with the geeky girl and Thumper. The song goes so far as to mock the concept of a montage–even the lyrics say: "We're gonna need a montage". As the race begins, Tad races quickly down the hill, stopping to place traps in order to slow Stan down. Still inexperienced, Stan moves so slowly that the traps do not even affect him, while the geeky girl Stan met earlier distracts Tad by lifting up her shirt and supposedly exposing her breasts. Tad freezes, while Stan passes him and wins the race. After the race, however, it is revealed that Tad's reaction of shock was actually due to the fact that, instead of breasts, the girl has two mutants growing out of her chest (a reference to the film Total Recall, complete with one of the mutants saying "Quaid, start the reactor!").

In the subplot, the boys' parents are coaxed into attending a 30-minute presentation by two timeshare salesmen. The parents repeatedly refuse and attempt to leave the conference room; however, they are told that the meeting is actually supposed to take place during lunch. They ask to leave during the lunch but are told to turn over their place cards, which reveal a prize of an exclusive ski lift. They board the ski lift, thinking it will provide them quick access to the slopes, but find it takes them straight back to the conference room. The parents attempt to leave the meeting, only to be held at gunpoint by the police and learning that the timeshare organization is in control of the police and other powerful authorities, including the President of the United States. Under duress, the parents reluctantly purchase a timeshare property. They return to the boys, who tell them the ski resort sucks and who are despondent that they all have to return to Aspen in the future due to the parents' purchase of the timeshare property.

== Production ==
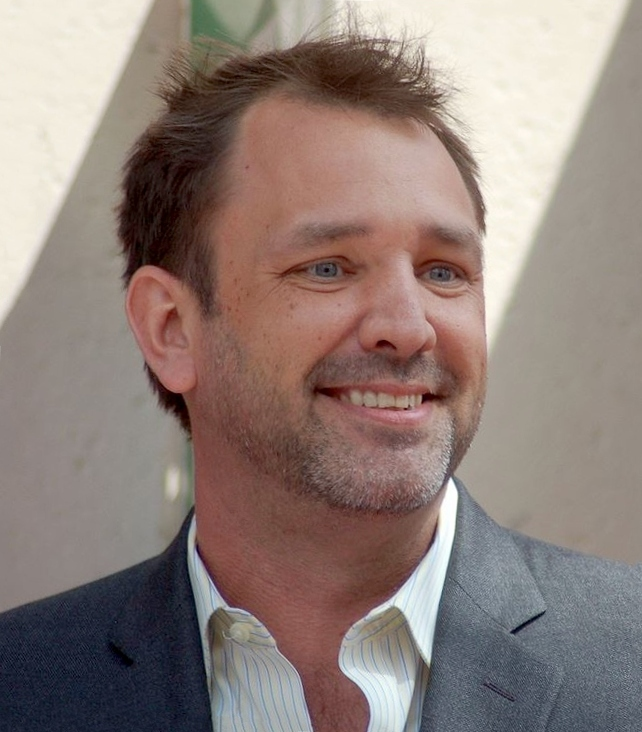
South Park co-creator Trey Parker wrote and directed "Asspen"

"Asspen" was written by series co-creator Trey Parker, who also directed the episode. The episode parodies several movies of the 1980s and early 1990s, including Hot Dog…The Movie, Ski School, Ski Patrol, Aspen Extreme, Total Recall, Pet Sematary and Better off Dead. Parker called the episode "really easy to write," as all he had to do was write a version of the underdog sports films the episode was parodying. The episode contains a subplot involving the boys' parents attempting to avoid purchasing a timeshare from two men. While at a story retreat in Whistler, British Columbia, Parker and Stone were repeatedly "harassed" by timeshare salesmen the entire time. This served as the inspiration for the story.

As Stan trains to become a better skier, a song called "Montage", similar to the Giorgio Moroder and Paul Engemann Scarface montage song "Push It to the Limit," is performed by Trey Parker and Matt Stone's band DVDA. The song was later reworked and used by Parker and Stone in Team America: World Police (2004). The episode features covers of the songs "The Safety Dance" by Canadian new wave synthpop band Men Without Hats (heard playing in the Aspen Youth Center) and "Take On Me" by Norwegian synthpop band A-ha (performed by Mr. Slave during the end credits as well as an instrumental interlude during the episode). The rights to use the latter song were cleared the morning the episode was set to air.

== Reception and release ==
Since its original airing, "Asspen" has received acclaim from critics. Brandon Stroud, writing for Uproxx, praised the episode, saying that "I could probably write a book that tries to explain why this is the quintessential South Park episode." Kevin Fitzpatrick, writing for UGO Network, stated that the 1980s sports movies were "perfectly skewered" and that "it'd take a full montage to explain all the things we love about this episode."

"Asspen," along with the sixteen other episodes from South Park: the Complete Sixth Season, were released on a three-disc DVD set in the United States on October 11, 2005. The sets include brief audio commentaries by Parker and Stone for each episode. IGN gave the season a rating of 9/10.
