= Cancelled (South Park) =

- South Park episode
- Episode no.: Season 7 Episode 1
- Directed by: Trey Parker
- Written by: Trey Parker
- Production code: 704
- Original air date: March 19, 2003

Episode chronology
← Previous "Red Sleigh Down"	Next → "Krazy Kripples"
- South Park season 7

"Cancelled" (also known as "Cartman Gets an Anal Probe Redux") is the first episode of the seventh season of the American animated television series South Park, and it is the 97th episode of the series overall. It first aired on Comedy Central on March 19, 2003. Going by production order, this is the 4th episode of Season 7.

In the episode, an alien satellite dish is placed in Cartman's butt. Shortly after, the boys are abducted by the aliens that installed it. They find out that the planet Earth is simply an intergalactic reality show. When word gets back to their home planet, the aliens decide to cancel the show, and something must be done if the boys want to save the day.

The episode was written by series co-creator Trey Parker. It was originally intended to air as the 100th episode, but "I'm a Little Bit Country" aired as the 100th episode instead.

== Plot ==
This episode begins almost identically to the very first South Park episode, "Cartman Gets an Anal Probe", with Cartman arriving and talking about a dream where he was abducted by aliens. There are some minor differences from the previous episode such as Cartman calling Ike a "semen-puking asshole dickhead" after Kyle tells him not to call his brother a "dildo" and Ike saying more profane statements like "Suck my balls" and "Don't kick the goddamn baby!". When the children realize that all this has happened before, they come to the conclusion that they are stuck in a "repeat", they and Chef decide to do something about the anal probe Cartman has; they first see a proctologist, then a scientist. Cartman then refuses to activate the satellite unless Kyle is the one who sticks his finger into his butt. Cartman torments Kyle seven times by continually farting, and finally Kyle gets fed up and plugs him. The scientist, Jeff Goldblum, discovers that he can reverse the polarity of the message that the alien ship is transmitting. A group of Visitors then show up, and the children and Chef flee. However, the children are ultimately abducted.

The kids wake up on the ship, and they meet Najix, an alien who looks like Stan's father, who explains that he chose an appearance that would be most pleasing to them. They hate this as it is too reminiscent of the movie Contact, which they hated. Najix shows his true form, a grotesque, terrifying monster, with yellow and green skin, four legs, and sharp teeth, so the children have him go through a series of transformations, mostly of celebrities or famous television characters, until Cartman suggests "a taco that craps ice cream". Najix then explains he and the other aliens make a reality show called Earth, and all of Earth's species, such as Asians, bears, ducks, Jews, deer and Hispanics, are taken from their respective home planets for the purposes of the show, and everyone around the world is unknowingly being filmed and watched.

The scientist discovers this at the same time on Earth by translating the binary code that resulted from reversing the polarity of the message he proceeds to tell everyone, which leads the alien network heads to cancel the show and prepare to destroy the Earth. The scientist concludes that the show is cancelled thanks to associating the term "chaos theory" up to "cancelled", then uses his word association skills with the word "jackets" to come up with a plan to send the ship a computer virus to disable their computers. Chef responds "That doesn't make any goddamned sense!". When word spreads to the rest of the planet that Earth is one big reality show, humans become elated that they're famous.

In outer space, Najix is informed that Earth is being cancelled, because humans' knowledge that they are a reality television show has ruined the program's quality. When the boys are informed that Earth will be destroyed in order to make way for something more useful, they go to the planet Fognl to meet the alien producers, the "Joozians", Jewish caricatures with large noses and stereotypical accents, described as controlling all media in the universe. The aliens are unmoved by the boy's pleas to save Earth, explaining that after 100 episodes, the show should be cancelled because shows tend to lose quality after 100 episodes. The Joozians then go to a strip bar, and inhale a purple powder in a manner similar to cocaine. They later get a hotel room with a hooker, and engage in acts that Kenny photographs. When the Joozians later sober up and express shame and embarrassment at their prior acts, the boys agree not to publicize their photo of the Joozians' sexual interlude if the Joozians agree to refrain from destroying Earth. The Joozians agree to this, though they decide to wipe out the truth about Earth's nature as a reality show from the memories of all humans, including those of the boys.

Back on Earth, the boys have no memory of what transpired, but Kenny still has the photo, and, though no one can remember what it is, Chef tells Kenny to keep it, as he feels sure that it is something very important. The episode ends with another advertisement for Earth, promising that in the next episode the "Americans and Iraqis have an all-out brawl". (The invasion of Iraq was launched on March 19, 2003, the night of this episode's original airing.)

== Reception and release ==
"Cancelled", along with the fourteen other episodes from The Complete Seventh Season, were released on a three-disc DVD set in the United States on March 21, 2006. The sets included brief audio commentaries by Parker and Stone for each episode. IGN gave the season an 8/10.
