= Fun with Veal =

- South Park episode
- Episode no.: Season 6 Episode 4
- Directed by: Trey Parker
- Written by: Trey Parker
- Production code: 605
- Original air date: March 27, 2002

Episode chronology
← Previous "Freak Strike"	Next → "The New Terrance and Phillip Movie Trailer"
- South Park season 6

"Fun with Veal" is the fourth episode of the sixth season of the animated television series South Park, and the 83rd episode of the series overall. It is the 4th episode in production order. It originally aired in the United States on Comedy Central on March 27, 2002. In the episode, Stan and the boys are horrified when they find what veal is made from, and then kidnap all the baby cows from a local ranch in South Park.

== Plot ==
Ms. Choksondik's fourth grade class goes on a field trip to a farm, where they discover that veal is made of baby cows. The boys, apart from Cartman, are horrified and decide to save the calves from becoming veal. Stan, Kyle, and Butters attempt to convince Cartman to help them rescue the calves and bring them to Stan's house. Cartman is forced to join the others to rescue the calves with his Mission Impossible Breaking and Entering play-set. When they are discovered by their parents the next morning, the boys barricade the door until they are promised the calves will be safe. Sharon refuses to lie and say they will be safe out of fear of regretting it, and Randy can not remove the door without destroying the house.

The situation quickly escalates into a standoff between the boys, who are declared terrorists, and the police. They live off some food smuggled in by Liane Cartman, which contains meat. While most of the group eagerly eats this food, Stan does not, as his reason for doing the deed extends far beyond just protecting the calves, so he becomes a vegetarian. Cartman makes fun of this, saying "if you don't eat meat, you become a pussy." Later, Stan comes down with a strange illness, and develops sores on his face.

An FBI negotiator proves no match for Cartman's powers of manipulation, and he negotiates for guns and ammunition in return for a calf. When the boys get the guns Cartman further manipulates the negotiator for an ICBM, but unsuccessfully tries to get North and South Dakota. He gets the FDA to change the term for veal to "tortured baby cow", and negotiates for a cattle truck driven by Michael Dorn. Furthermore, Dorn is forced into full Worf makeup and must call Cartman 'Captain'. He is to drive everyone to the airport so they can escape to Mexico, despite being reluctant to do so. All of this, without handing over a single calf. The negotiator, due to easily giving in to these ludicrous demands, is eventually fired.

The FBI double-crosses the boys and the calves are returned, but are rendered useless, as there is now no market for "little tortured baby cow". Stan has to go to the hospital; it turns out Cartman was correct about the results of not eating meat when Stan's doctor explains that he has vaginitis, and the sores on his face were actually vaginas, which would have turned him into a giant vagina. The episode ends with the boys, with the possible exception of Cartman, getting grounded, but not before going out with their parents for burgers.

== Production ==
In the DVD commentary, the creators said they wanted to balance their message of not eating baby animals, but at the same time not advocating people to abstain from meat consumption altogether. Randy Marsh compares the boys to "little John Walkers." This is meant as a reference to John Walker Lindh, an American who fought for the Taliban. Michael Dorn is famous for playing Lieutenant Commander Worf on Star Trek: The Next Generation and Star Trek: Deep Space Nine. He is portrayed in this episode wearing a sweatshirt which bears the logo of Pasadena City College, his real-life alma mater. After the episode was broadcast, Dorn revealed that he is a fan of South Park, and would have provided his own voice for the episode had he been asked. Dorn himself is a vegan. The negotiations over the phone, the cattle truck, and most of this episode (such as the part when Cartman was standing outside the front door ordering that the men step back) is a parody of the 1975 film Dog Day Afternoon.

== Home media ==
"Fun with Veal," along with the sixteen other episodes from South Park: the Complete Sixth Season, were released on a three-disc DVD set in the United States on October 11, 2005. The sets include brief audio commentaries by Parker and Stone for each episode. IGN gave the season a rating of 9/10.
