= South Park season 6 =

Season of television series

South Park
- Season 6
- Home media release cover
- No. of episodes: 17

Release
- Original network: Comedy Central
- Original release: March 6 – December 11, 2002

Season chronology
- ← Previous; Season 5 Next → Season 7

The sixth season of South Park, an American animated television series created by Trey Parker and Matt Stone, began airing on March 6, 2002. The sixth season concluded after 17 episodes on December 11, 2002.

The sixth season is the only season of South Park to not feature Kenny McCormick as a main character, due to him being killed off at the end of the previous season in "Kenny Dies." He was revived at the end of the season finale, "Red Sleigh Down", appearing in the last few seconds. This was his sole appearance in the season, if not counting a brief flashback (with new dialogue) in "A Ladder to Heaven".

== Production ==
=== Rise of Butters and Tweek as main characters ===
Kenny was written off in "Kenny Dies" at the end of season 5 of South Park, though he was mentioned throughout season 6. The other boys mourning Kenny's loss and trying to find a replacement was a reoccurring theme in the season.

For the first five episodes of season 6, Butters fills Kenny's position as the fourth member of "the boys." The rise of Butters as a main character in this season would lay the groundwork for the eventual use and development of Butters' character in future seasons of South Park.

The sixth episode of the season, "Professor Chaos", sees the boys dismissing Butters as Kenny's replacement and Tweek is chosen to fill the position, from episodes 7 to 11.

=== Kenny's permanent death, subsequent cameos, and resurrection ===
Initially, South Park was going to continue beyond season 6 with Kenny remaining deceased indefinitely. After several years of needing to devise a number of unique ways of repeatedly killing off the character each episode, Trey Parker and Matt Stone planned to make Kenny's absence permanent. Despite season 6 being well-liked among fans, a small group of viewers protested Kenny's permanent death and even threatened to boycott Comedy Central, the network airing South Park. In response to this backlash, Trey Parker and Matt Stone reversed the decision, acknowledging that South Park wouldn't be the same without Kenny. Consequently, season 6 is the sole season of the series where he was (mostly) absent.

However, Kenny was not entirely written out of the show following "Kenny Dies". He briefly cameoed in the episode "Free Hat" and appeared in flashbacks from "A Ladder to Heaven" to "The Biggest Douche in the Universe", where he appeared as a ghost possessing Cartman's body. Kenny ultimately returned in the final seconds of the finale, "Red Sleigh Down."

== Voice cast ==
=== Main cast ===
- Trey Parker as Stan Marsh, Eric Cartman, Randy Marsh, Mr. Garrison, Clyde Donovan, Mr. Hankey, Mr. Mackey, Stephen Stotch, Jimmy Valmer, Timmy Burch, Phillip, and Kenny McCormick possessing Cartman's body
- Matt Stone as Kyle Broflovski, Butters Stotch, Tweek Tweak, Gerald Broflovski, Stuart McCormick, Craig Tucker, Jimbo Kern, Terrance, Jesus, and Kenny McCormick
- Eliza Schneider as Liane Cartman, Sheila Broflovski, Shelly Marsh, Sharon Marsh, Mayor McDaniels, Carol McCormick, Wendy Testaburger, Principal Victoria and Ms. Crabtree
- Mona Marshall as Sheila Broflovski and Linda Stotch
- Isaac Hayes as Chef

=== Guest cast ===
- John Hansen as Mr. Slave ("The Death Camp of Tolerance")

== Episodes ==
No. overall	No. in season	Title	Directed by	Written by	Original release date	Prod. code	Viewers (millions)
80	1	"Jared Has Aides"	Trey Parker	Trey Parker	March 6, 2002	602	3.30
Weight loss advocate Jared Fogle incurs the wrath of the town after he announces that he lost weight because he has aides (misinterpreted as AIDS). Meanwhile, the boys use Butters as their spokesman for a Chinese restaurant, as Butters is on punishment and has Cartman covering for him.
81	2	"Asspen"	Trey Parker	Trey Parker	March 13, 2002	603	2.60
The boys and their parents vacation in Aspen. Stan is dragged into a skiing competition with a plot straight out of a rom-com, while their parents are imprisoned at a timeshare seminar.
82	3	"Freak Strike"	Trey Parker	Trey Parker	March 20, 2002	601	3.15
The boys disguise Butters as a victim of a birth defect so they can win a prize on The Maury Povich Show, but when the freaks go on strike, Cartman disguises himself as an out of control teenage girl in order to get on Maury.
83	4	"Fun with Veal"	Trey Parker	Trey Parker	March 27, 2002	605	2.78
The boys try to save baby cows destined to become veal from torture and slaughter.
84	5	"The New Terrance and Phillip Movie Trailer"	Trey Parker	Trey Parker	April 3, 2002	604	2.78
The boys have to sit through Fightin' Round the World, a boring TV show starring Russell Crowe, to see a trailer for the new Terrance and Phillip movie, but risk missing it when Shelley sends the boys out to buy her tampons and the boys try to find another TV to watch the trailer.
85	6	"Professor Chaos"	Trey Parker	Trey Parker	April 10, 2002	606	2.43
Part one of two. The boys try to find a replacement for Butters by holding a contest. Meanwhile, Butters becomes a supervillain after being fired from the group.
86	7	"Simpsons Already Did It"	Trey Parker	Trey Parker	June 26, 2002	607	1.94
Conclusion. Butters discovers that all of his plots for destroying the world have been done before on the animated sitcom The Simpsons. Meanwhile, Cartman creates a miniature society of sea people in his aquarium.
87	8	"Red Hot Catholic Love"	Trey Parker	Trey Parker	July 3, 2002	608	1.49
Following the Catholic Church molestation scandals, Father Maxi tries to bring about reform, the South Park parents convert to atheism, and Cartman wins a bet with Kyle that he can defecate from his mouth.
88	9	"Free Hat"	Toni Nugnes	Trey Parker	July 10, 2002	609	2.80
The kids form a club to try to stop Steven Spielberg and George Lucas from editing their classic films, but the townspeople mistake it as a call to free a child murderer named Hat McCullough from prison.
89	10	"Bebe's Boobs Destroy Society"	Trey Parker	Trey Parker	July 17, 2002	610	2.53
The boys in class start acting weird when Bebe begins to develop breasts, while Wendy Testaburger gets implants so the boys will notice her.
90	11	"Child Abduction Is Not Funny"	Trey Parker	Trey Parker	July 24, 2002	611	2.01
The parents hire Tuong Lu Kim to build a wall around the city to protect the children from kidnappers, but end up letting their kids go after learning that parents are more likely to abduct their own children than total strangers.
91	12	"A Ladder to Heaven"	Trey Parker	Trey Parker	November 6, 2002	612	2.65
The boys build a ladder to heaven to talk to Kenny about a candy coupon. Meanwhile, Cartman accidentally drinks Kenny’s ashes and becomes possessed with his spirit. Note: This was the first time Trey Parker provided the voice of Kenny McCormick, as he was possessing Cartman's body after he drank his ashes.
92	13	"The Return of the Fellowship of the Ring to the Two Towers"	Trey Parker	Trey Parker	November 13, 2002	613	2.80
The boys go on a quest to return a tape with "evil powers" to the video store before the sixth graders steal it from them. Meanwhile, the parents try to find their kids to explain the context of the porno film they have in their possession.
93	14	"The Death Camp of Tolerance"	Trey Parker	Trey Parker	November 20, 2002	614	2.23
Mr. Garrison tries to get fired for discrimination by performing inappropriate acts in class with his new teaching assistant Mr. Slave so he can file a lawsuit against the school, but the school administration instead sends the students to a "tolerance camp" to learn how to deal with people of different walks of life.
94	15	"The Biggest Douche in the Universe"	Trey Parker	Trey Parker	November 27, 2002	615	1.71
Chef's parents try to exorcise Kenny's spirit from Cartman. Meanwhile, Stan calls out John Edward for providing false hope to people whose loved ones have died.
95	16	"My Future Self 'n' Me"	Trey Parker & Eric Stough	Trey Parker	December 4, 2002	616	2.95
Stan meets a man who claims to be Stan in the future after a life of abusing drugs and alcohol. Meanwhile, Cartman starts a "revenge business".
96	17	"Red Sleigh Down"	Trey Parker	Trey Parker	December 11, 2002	617	1.98
In this parody of Black Hawk Down and Three Kings, Cartman tries to bring Christmas to the downtrodden in Iraq to get on Santa's "nice" list. Also, Kenny returns after being "permanently" killed off in season 5, due to fan demand.

== See also ==
- South Park (Park County, Colorado)
- South Park City
