= Child Abduction Is Not Funny =

- South Park episode
- Episode no.: Season 6 Episode 11
- Directed by: Trey Parker
- Written by: Trey Parker
- Production code: 611
- Original air date: July 24, 2002

Episode chronology
← Previous "Bebe's Boobs Destroy Society"	Next → "A Ladder to Heaven"
- South Park season 6

"Child Abduction Is Not Funny" is the eleventh episode of the sixth season of the American animated television series South Park and the 90th episode of the series overall. It originally aired on July 24, 2002. This episode mocks kidnapping, moral panics, and the Mongol conquest of China. The episode was also the last to feature Tweek as the "fourth friend" alongside Stan, Kyle and Cartman; as Kenny partially returned to the group through the possession of Cartman, starting in the following episode "A Ladder to Heaven". Kenny officially returned to the show at the end of the Season 6 finale "Red Sleigh Down".

In the episode, the parents of South Park hire the owner and operator of the local City Wok, Mr. Tuong Lu Kim, to build a Great Wall around the city to protect their children from kidnappers. Just as Mr. Tuong Lu Kim almost finishes the wall, Mongolians arrive to try to break through. When a study reveals that nine out of ten abduction cases are committed by the mother or the father, the parents send their kids out on their own, so they won't have a fear of being kidnapped by their parents.

In the summer of 2013, fans voted "Child Abduction Is Not Funny" as the best episode of Season 6.

== Plot ==
With the media full of school shootings, terrorist threats, and child abductions, the parents of South Park grow excessively concerned about the safety of their children. Tweek is scared the most by the media reports, and his parents serve only to exacerbate his fears by turning their house into a virtual prison and playing cruel intellectual games with him designed by intention to increase his safety. As a result, Tweek loses his ability to empathize with others – even refusing to assist a disabled person, whose powerchair ran out of battery power, and is now stuck on some train tracks, resulting in him getting killed by an oncoming train. After a real child abductor (pretending to be the "Ghost of Human Kindness") fails to kidnap Tweek, the parents of South Park are put on high alert.

Taking advantage of expensive technology, the City commissions the owner of City Wok, Mr. Lu Kim to build a huge wall around the city, similar to the Great Wall of China. Media reports continue to file in — it first convinces them they should not leave their children alone for a moment, prompting the parents to go with them anywhere they go. A later report convinces them they cannot even trust their own neighbors and family friends, forcing the parents to sever ties with each other. The kids, annoyed and embarrassed by their parents' actions, initially blame Tweek for their parents' paranoia, but soon decide that they'd have inevitably resorted to something this stupid eventually.

Despite trying to avoid being a stereotype and having no experience in construction, Mr. Kim reluctantly agrees to build the wall. He builds a very impressive one single-handedly. After he is finished, a band of Mongols appear out of nowhere and attack the wall because: "Every time us Chinese put up a wall stupid Mongorianzh have to come and knock it down," as he puts it, in a reference to Chinese history. Although he tries desperately to rout the enemy by himself, he proves to be no match for the Mongols' increasingly clever tactics, which include redirecting a heat-seeking missile with a flaming baseball and making use of a Trojan Horse filled with sweet and sour pork. Enraged, Kim vows vengeance for the rest of his life.

Meanwhile, back within the town, a news report states that the parents are most likely to abduct their own children. Blindly believing what they have been told, they send their children from the city in a tearful ceremony in order to avoid putting their children in danger of being kidnapped by their own parents. As they leave, the children wonder about how stupid their parents are sometimes.

Within the week, the children join forces with the Mongols, having apparently learned their language, and expressing anger at their parents' irresponsible and irrational behavior, even though the Mongolians weren't here in South Park to abduct all the children of South Park, they just wanted to have them to become part of their group to break down the city wall. The Mongols then move on the wall again, where Mr. Kim is dressed for battle. He then does his "war dance", but while he is doing this, the children wheel a large cart laden with explosives in behind him and blow up the wall. The parents arrive to investigate the explosion, and are reunited with their kids. They realize that they overreacted to the news stories, and that to cut themselves off from the rest of the world with the wall denies new possibilities. Mayor McDaniels orders Mr. Lu Kim to "tear down this wall," angering him once more since building the wall was a waste of time. Despite the reunion, the parents believe their children have forgotten them in the short space of four days and use simple English to convince them to return home (with Stan muttering to Kyle, "Jesus Christ, dude, they've done some stupid crap before, but Jesus Christ.").

== Production ==
According to the DVD commentary, the episode was done right after the creators saw the Elizabeth Smart abduction in Utah on the news. Parker and Stone came up with the line "Goddamn Mongorianzh, no more breaking down my shitty warr!" while on the Great Wall of China in the 1990s.

== Cultural references ==
When Mr. Kim gets ready to shoot the heat seeking missile, he introduces it to the Mongolians, saying "Say herro to my rittre friend." This is a reference to the movie Scarface. Mayor McDaniels' line "Mr. Lu Kim, tear down this wall!" is a reference to Ronald Reagan's 1987 speech challenging Mikhail Gorbachev to tear down the Berlin Wall. When the child abductor dressed as the Ghost of Human Kindness is caught by the police, he says "and I would have gotten away with it too, if it weren't for you meddling policemen" a reference to Scooby-Doo, in which when the episode's antagonist (who would disguise themselves as a monster) was unmasked, would use the phrase but with "meddling kids" instead of "meddling policemen".

== Home media ==
"Child Abduction Is Not Funny", along with the sixteen other episodes from South Park's sixth season, were released on a three-disc DVD set in the United States on October 11, 2005. The sets included brief audio commentaries by Parker and Stone for each episode. IGN gave the season a rating of 9/10.
