= My Future Self 'n' Me =

- South Park episode
- Episode no.: Season 6 Episode 16
- Directed by: Trey Parker; Eric Stough
- Written by: Trey Parker
- Production code: 616
- Original air date: December 4, 2002

Episode chronology
← Previous "The Biggest Douche in the Universe"	Next → "Red Sleigh Down"
- South Park season 6

"My Future Self 'n' Me" is the sixteenth episode of the sixth season of the American animated series South Park, and the 95th episode of the series overall. It was first broadcast on Comedy Central on December 4, 2002.

In the episode, a man claiming to be Stan's future self shows up to his house. Stan's future self is an unemployed drug addict, but Stan suspects that it is a hoax put on by his parents, while South Park's own little entrepreneur, Eric Cartman, is at the helm of a new money-making venture, and Cartman is in the business of revenge.

== Plot ==
The boys have found a joint that has been left behind by the high schoolers. They are afraid, because according to commercials you die when you touch it and marijuana causes terrorism. Stan is not afraid and throws away the joint.

That night, in the middle of a thunderstorm, a man claiming to be an older version of Stan appears at the Marsh family's door. This future Stan has spent time in juvenile hall, used large amounts of drugs and alcohol, which Stan decides must have begun when he first touched the marijuana cigarette. He is convinced that the only way to safeguard his future is for his present self to avoid drugs and alcohol, do well in school, and stay motivated in life. Stan even asks Butters to tutor him. While the two boys are talking, Stan discovers that Butters also has a slovenly "Future Self" living with him.

Stan finds the whole situation suspicious, and the two find an employee card in the "future" Stan's personal effects labelled "Motivation Corp." leading them to finding out it is where parents hire actors to pose as their children's future self to make them avoid drugs and alcohol. Stan is appalled at the way these parents have all deceived their kids and he and Butters decide to look in the phone book to find a place to run away to. However, they discover a "Parental Revenge Center" hotline with guaranteed results, which is run by Cartman who agrees to help the two. However, Cartman's revenge plan for both boys involves going to both of their houses to smear all of the walls with feces. Butters is delighted by this offer and gladly accepts it, while Stan believes that it isn't adequate payback. Cartman then tries to convince Stan by taking it up a notch and offering to kill his parents and slice them into pieces. Stan refuses this offer as well, and decides to worm the truth out of his parents himself in order to force them to acknowledge that they lied to him.

Stan tries to get the truth out of his parents by pretending to cut off his own hand so that his "future self's" hand would also come off as a way of seeing if he really is Stan's future self, but Randy improvises by deliberately cutting off the actor's hand after doing so. Though Stan reveals that he didn't actually cut his hand off at all, Randy ends up pretending that the actor's hand has never been cut off while trying to attach it back on him, causing Stan to storm out of his home in frustration. Meanwhile, the Parental Revenge Agency does its job at Butters' house as Cartman and a group of Hispanic child workers smear feces all over the living room and bedroom of the Stotch household. Upon returning home, Chris and Linda actually acknowledge that they deserve it for lying and finally tell the truth about the "future self" thing and apologize to Butters, to Stan's shock.

Randy and Sharon arrive and continue blatantly lying to Stan, insisting that more future selves must be coming back in time to the present, which finally causes Stan to snap and tell them that he knows all about Motivation Corp., and that he was trying to get them to admit they lied to him. Randy and Sharon come to the realization that if they just keep lying to him, he might not ever trust them again; Randy finally apologizes to Stan and gives him the whole truth about drug abuse, saying that it probably won't kill him or fund terrorism but still may ruin his future. Stan adds he really wishes they had just told him that in the first place instead of lying to him. The Marshes claim that what Motivation Corp. is at fault and hires Cartman to smear their walls with feces. At that point, Stan thanks Cartman, saying that he really came through.

Cartman says that the whole experience has taught him that he should think about his own future and start taking better care of himself. Moments later, a thin and handsome man, claiming to be Cartman's future self, shows up and tells Cartman that this was the turning point in his life. From this day forward, he turns his life around, and will become the famous CEO of a time-traveling company. Cartman is not convinced, believing it to be yet another Motivation Corp. actor and immediately changes his mind, vowing to do "whatever I want!" from then on, which includes eating unhealthy and doing drugs. As it turns out, the man is Cartman's future self and due to his past self's vow almost immediately transforms into a dirty, morbidly obese mechanic. Future Cartman then exclaims, "Oh, goddamn it!"

== Cultural references ==
Stan watches Ozzy Osbourne's reality TV series of The Osbournes on MTV, before his mom changes the channel by force, claiming that it will make him “retarded.”

== Theme ==
The episode delivers a direct anti-drug message while simultaneously poking fun at all the anti-drug commercials and propaganda that were airing during most teen and young adult oriented television blocks at the time (specifically, the dubious claims many were making about the consequences of marijuana use). In the DVD commentary, Parker and Stone stated that they were inspired to do the episode after seeing an advertisement by The Partnership For A Drug-Free America which linked marijuana use to terrorism. Parker stated that they had originally intended for the episode to include a spoof of the commercial but decided against it when they could not think of anything more ridiculous than saying, "If you smoke pot, you become a terrorist".

Butters' "Future Self" only watches Becker, a series the young Butters finds "stupid".

== Home media ==
"My Future Self 'n' Me", along with the sixteen other episodes from South Park's sixth season, were released on a three-disc DVD set in the United States on October 11, 2005. The sets included brief audio commentaries by Parker and Stone for each episode. IGN gave the season a rating of 9/10.
