= The Return of the Fellowship of the Ring to the Two Towers =

- South Park episode
- Episode no.: Season 6 Episode 13
- Directed by: Trey Parker
- Written by: Trey Parker
- Production code: 613
- Original air date: November 13, 2002

Episode chronology
← Previous "A Ladder to Heaven"	Next → "The Death Camp of Tolerance"
- South Park season 6

"The Return of the Fellowship of the Ring to the Two Towers" is the thirteenth episode of the sixth season of the American animated television series South Park, and the 92nd overall episode of the series. It originally aired on Comedy Central in the United States on November 13, 2002. In the episode, the boys dress up and play as characters from The Lord of the Rings film series, with several events and characters substituted into the narrative. They extend their game into a "quest" to return a copy of the film to a local video store. Meanwhile, the adults have accidentally switched the tape with a pornographic film.

The episode was written by series co-creator Trey Parker. Both Parker and co-creator Matt Stone have repeatedly referred to it as one of their favorite and strongest episodes of South Park.

== Plot ==
The episode opens with Stan, Kyle, Cartman, and a disembodied Kenny (sharing Cartman's body) playing "The Lord of the Rings." Stan's parents have rented the movie The Lord of the Rings (specifically, The Fellowship of the Ring), and tell Stan, Kyle & Cartman to bring it to Butters' parents, as they had asked to borrow it. Still caught up in their game, the boys see this assignment as a "quest", and set off on their journey. Stan's parents attempt to watch a pornographic movie, but discover Randy mixed it up with the Lord of the Rings tape, and realize that Butters is now watching it at his house.

The two drive to Butters' house, and come across the boys returning home, having already delivered the tape. Stan's father plays into the boys' imagination and sends them on their greatest quest ever: retrieve the tape, but do not look at it as it "holds an evil power." Excited, the boys eagerly comply and set off toward Butters' house. They arrive and take the tape, but not before discovering that Butters, though not realizing the nature of it, has watched the movie and becomes obsessed with it, even wondering aloud, "What's happenin' down there?" (in reference to his groin) before the other boys arrive. Excluded from the game and denied the video, Butters becomes steadily more insane, and remains secluded in the basement, muttering about his "precious" and generally acting like Sméagol/Gollum. At this point the Marshes, who have grown worried that the boys have not returned, show up. Distraught at Butters' behavior, they assume that the boys now have the tape and are watching it. Contacting the other parents, they inform them that the pornographic movie in question is called "Backdoor Sluts 9", considered by many as 'the most hardcore porno ever made' and go on a desperate search to find their missing children and "put it into context."

Returning home, the boys run into some sixth graders, who look inside the box and realize what the contents are. Although they try to take the tape, the boys are able to escape and decide to take it to the council of the High Elf of Faragon (Clyde). At the council, at which most of the fourth graders are present (in The Lord of the Rings costumes, except for Kevin Stoley, who is wearing a Star Wars mask), it is decided that to determine the tape's power, they should send one of their own to watch it for a few minutes. Talonguard the Black (Token) is volunteered, and steps inside his house for a moment. He soon comes out, expressionless and dressed in his regular clothes, and announces, without explanation, that he is not playing anymore. Now truly convinced of the tape's power, the council decides the tape must be returned to the Two Towers video store in Conifer "from whence [sic] it came", and forms the "Fellowship of The Lord of the Rings", which consists of Stan, Kyle, Cartman (with Kenny), Craig, Jimmy, and Filmore.

The boys avoid a run-in with the sixth graders but their party loses Jimmy, Craig, and the kindergartener. Butters, who has been following them, offers to guide the remaining party members to the store in a thinly veiled attempt to get the tape back. Soon all the boys wind up at the Two Towers, and with the sixth graders in hot pursuit they desperately try to return the tape to the drop box. When Butters refuses to let go of it, Kyle throws him and the tape into the drop box. Angered at losing their movie, the sixth graders, now acting as Sauron and the Ringwraiths, threaten to beat the boys up, but flee when the parents arrive. The parents, having already haphazardly explained to Token what he saw, then go into a long discussion with the astonished boys about sex, touching on such subjects as 69ing and double penetration. The boys, who never actually watched the movie that their parents are so graphically describing, are speechless with Stan simply saying "Wow". The episode ends with a view of Butters, clutching his "precious" among a pile of other returned tapes in the drop box.

== Production ==
The episode's plot line was inspired by events from series co-creator Trey Parker's childhood. While in a writer's meeting in producing the episode, he recalled a period in which another boy from his neighborhood found his parents' VHS copy of a pornographic film. He remembered he and others his age rushing over to view the film, and being "perplexed" as to what they were seeing. As he was too young to be in any way aroused by onscreen intercourse, he found the naivety humorous and worked it into the episode. The audio for the pornographic film is actual audio from a random video; its use in the episode required Parker and Stone to seek out the distributor to get clearance for it. At one point, video from the film was used in the episode, but it was taken out.

== Cultural references ==
The episode's title is a combination of those from the Lord of the Rings trilogy.

== Reception ==
IGN rated the episode a 9/10, stating "There's also a lot of nice little jabs at the LOTR phenomenon, it's [sic] pretensions and over indulgence – both in terms of the movies and the books" and comment on how fun it is for the show to juggle the stories within one scene.

Trey Parker has called the episode one of his favorite episodes of the series, as it follows a simple formula of "boys being boys." Matt Stone also referenced it as a "quintessential" episode, remarking, "If we could make every South Park episode this good, we’d be totally psyched." The episode was included on a 2006 compilation DVD, South Park: The Hits. In the commentary, Trey Parker remarks that the episode is "Just a perfect example, to us, about how much fun the show can be when it's just kids being kids."

This episode was used as a basis for the 2014 video game South Park: The Stick of Truth, where the characters once again resume their medieval fantasy roleplaying and wear their outfits from this episode.
