= Bebe's Boobs Destroy Society =

- South Park episode
- Episode no.: Season 6 Episode 10
- Directed by: Trey Parker
- Written by: Trey Parker
- Production code: 610
- Original air date: July 17, 2002

Episode chronology
← Previous "Free Hat"	Next → "Child Abduction Is Not Funny"
- South Park season 6

"Bebe's Boobs Destroy Society" is the tenth episode of the sixth season of South Park, originally aired on July 17, 2002. In the episode, Bebe Stevens's breasts begin to develop, and the boys are suddenly drawn to her even though they had no interest in her before. The episode focuses on and satirizes men's fascination over women's breasts.

== Plot ==
The children return to school for the first time since the death of Ms. Choksondik in the episode "Simpsons Already Did It." For the time being, Mr. Mackey will be their teacher. During the break, Bebe (Wendy's best friend) has started to develop breasts. Though they are small (she at first thought they were mosquito bites), they prompt all the boys in town to begin to think that she is unusually smart and cool, without even understanding why. However, this causes Wendy and the other girls to get incredibly jealous, especially since Stan, Wendy's boyfriend (who hasn't asked Wendy to hang out with Stan and the other boys), is one of the boys affected. The girls begin making up malicious rumors about Bebe and accuse her of being sexually promiscuous.

Consequently, the boys begin to fight and bicker about who gets to play with Bebe, sound-effects play as the boys fight like the primitive men from 2001: A Space Odyssey and Planet of the Apes.

Throughout the episode, Cartman plays a game he calls "Lambs," which involves placing one of his dolls in a pit in his basement and torturing it, saying, "It puts the lotion on its skin, or else it gets the hose again", as a reference to Silence of the Lambs.

Eventually, the boys get into a fight and seem to permanently turn into cavemen. Meanwhile, Bebe worries that boys may never take her seriously (as happened to her mother, a stereotypical dumb blonde). She consults a plastic surgeon about breast reduction surgery, however, the doctor rejects her request because he considers breast reduction "insane" (which is made especially apparent when the doctor treats two female colleagues differently: One with large breasts that he's very nice to, and the other with a flat chest that he's rude to). He then tells Bebe that if she wants bigger breasts "now might be the time to size up." Bebe leaves his office in frustration and disgust. By contrast, when Wendy asks for breast augmentation he accepts her request, despite her mother's protest that she is too young, after Wendy announces that she has three thousand dollars in cash. Meanwhile, Stan draws pictures of breasts on the wall of his house referring to his work and breasts as "Ah-tah", an apparent reference to the film Quest for Fire, wherein prehistoric man refers to fire as "Atar." Stan's father, Randy, has a talk with him about puberty and Stan's fixation with breasts: "And one day you'll meet a pair of boobs you want to marry." This eventually convinces Stan to snap out of his caveman-like trance.

After this scene, Bebe is shown in bed, with her breasts glowing and speaking to each other, plotting to rule the world by taking over the boys' minds. Bebe awakens and screams, her mother quickly runs into the room to ask her what is happening, she explains what she heard and her mother calmly replies that it is only natural for a growing woman to have boobs that plot to take over boys' minds. This is where Bebe snaps, claiming she does not want boobs that are going to try to rule the world, and begins to come up with a plan to fix this problem.

The next time they are seen at school, Bebe walks in wearing a box over her chest, which causes all the boys to suddenly break out of their trance. Stan shares his father's advice not to let breasts control their lives, and the boys all agree not to fight over girls. Consequently, when Wendy shows up with her new breast implants, she is ridiculed rather than praised. Butters pokes Wendy's implants, saying that they are all "hard and oogy," to which Cartman replies, "What a stupid bitch!" Wendy looks embarrassed.

== Production ==
In the DVD commentary, Parker describes the inspiration for the show came from a party where two of his friends were drunk and trying to hit on a girl. One of the guys starts stroking the girls hair, when the other guy reached to stroke the girls hair too, the first guy started making guttural gorilla noises. Stone describes how South Park takes the view that society is the only thing that keeps people from descending into savages.

On syndicated broadcasts, the scene where Wendy is in surgery getting breast implants is cut.

The episode has been used to examine the treatment of female characters in South Park.

== Home media ==
"Bebe's Boobs Destroy Society", along with the sixteen other episodes from South Park's sixth season, were released on a three-disc DVD set in the United States on October 11, 2005. The sets included brief audio commentaries by Parker and Stone for each episode. IGN gave the season a rating of 9/10.
