= Red Hot Catholic Love =

- South Park episode
- Episode no.: Season 6 Episode 8
- Directed by: Trey Parker
- Written by: Trey Parker; Daisy Gardner
- Production code: 608
- Original air date: July 3, 2002

Episode chronology
← Previous "Simpsons Already Did It"	Next → "Free Hat"
- South Park season 6

"Red Hot Catholic Love" is the eighth episode of the sixth season of the American animated television series South Park and the 87th episode of the series overall. It originally aired on July 3, 2002. It was selected No. 2 on the "10 South Park Episodes that Changed the World" list, and was also part of "South Park's Dirty Dozen". In the episode, Father Maxi travels to the Vatican to confront the growing problem of Catholic priests molesting children. Meanwhile, Cartman discovers that it is possible to defecate from the mouth.

== Plot ==
The parents of South Park are concerned when Father Maxi informs them about a catholic retreat for children. They hire a counselor to talk to the boys, who asks the children if Father Maxi had ever put something in their butt. Having never been abused by Father Maxi, the boys are baffled by the question. Eric Cartman explains that the counselor meant it could be possible that eating food through the rectum can cause defecation through the mouth. Kyle makes a bet for $20 that it will not work with Cartman. Meanwhile, the parents decide to become atheists, as the sexual molestation scandals have destroyed their faith in Catholicism.

Cartman later defecates out of his mouth, winning the bet. He repeatedly boasts the fact to Kyle, who becomes increasingly angered by it. News of this spreads, and it is concluded nationwide that this method of eating is healthier than the traditional method. It is immediately adopted as the new method of eating. Eventually, Kyle loses his patience with Cartman's boasting, but instead of snapping, he tells Cartman that he accepts the fact that he beat him fairly. Cartman is enraged and leaves the money behind as he storms off, much to Kyle’s relief.

Meanwhile, Maxi decides he has to go to the Vatican to stop the molestation problem. Once there, he quickly find priests from all over the world are molesting children and claim they need to continue the practice to receive gratification. They claim the "Holy Document of Vatican Law" does not prohibit the behavior, so Maxi wants to change the canon law to outlaw sodomy. Maxi searches through the lower levels of the Vatican to find the Holy Document so he can change it. Returning with the Document, the Pope claims that they must first consult the "Queen Spider", the highest power within the Church, who declares that the Holy Document of Vatican Law cannot be changed. Though given a chance to change her mind, Maxi finally snaps and tears the Document in two. This results in all of Vatican City being destroyed.

The parents are pleased when they hear this and watch the news with the boys. However, Maxi tells everyone that Catholicism is not about the Holy Document of Vatican Law, molestation, or Queen Spiders, but about being a good person. He says by clouding the moral lessons of the Bible with needless ceremony and so many literal translations, the Vatican has caused people to reject religion. The parents regain their faith in God, deciding to stop shoving food up their rectums and start going to church again.

== Production ==
In the DVD commentary for this episode, Stone and Parker refer to their irritation towards arguments from more socially liberal/atheistic/secular-minded types of people, as well as from socially religious conservatives. The scene where the parents discuss atheism while crapping out their mouths is based on Parker's annoyance with atheists. When Maxi searches for the Holy Document the scene is animated in the style of Pitfall! Randy's nightmare about the priest molesting the boys is done using footage from The Love Boat.

The Great Queen Spider was taken from "Planet of the Spiders", a 1974 serial of Doctor Who, and is later referenced in the 2017 Role-playing video game South Park: The Fractured but Whole.

== Home media ==
"Red Hot Catholic Love", along with the sixteen other episodes from South Park's sixth season, was released on a three-disc DVD set in the United States on October 11, 2005. The sets included brief audio commentaries by Parker and Stone for each episode. IGN gave the season a rating of 9/10.

The episode is also one of three included in the 2005 DVD release South Park: The Passion of the Jew, alongside the titular episode and "Christian Rock Hard".

== See also ==
- South Park (Park County, Colorado)
- South Park City
