= Free Hat =

- South Park episode
- Episode no.: Season 6 Episode 9
- Directed by: Toni Nugnes
- Written by: Trey Parker
- Production code: 609
- Original air date: July 10, 2002

Episode chronology
← Previous "Red Hot Catholic Love"	Next → "Bebe's Boobs Destroy Society"
- South Park season 6

"Free Hat" is the ninth episode of the sixth season of the American animated television series South Park. The 88th overall episode of the series, it first aired on Comedy Central in the United States on July 10, 2002. The episode was written by series co-creator Trey Parker, and was originally rated TV-MA in the United States; it was re-rated TV-14 in 2020.

In the episode, the boys are angered at alterations made to films prior to their re-release, which they perceive as resultantly inferior. In response, they resolve to prevent any further changes to the films by apprehending their directors, while also catering to a group demanding the release of a convicted child murderer after they misconstrue a notice written on their club's sign.

Much of the plot of "Free Hat" parodies Raiders of the Lost Ark. The episode satirizes digital alterations made to films such as the original Star Wars trilogy and E.T. the Extra-Terrestrial, the latter of which was reissued four months prior to the episode's airdate.

== Plot ==
At a movie theater, Kyle, Stan, Cartman and Tweek express contempt at Steven Spielberg and George Lucas altering their films prior to their reissue to "make them more PC". They decide to form an organization to promote their cause. As an incentive, Cartman decides they should give out free hats to get people to come to the meeting and assigns Tweek to fold newspapers into hats, but Cartman writes the letters on the sign too large and is forced to leave off the "S", so that it reads "FREE HAT". Tweek is unable to make enough hats and the boys are surprised by the large turnout at the organization's first meeting. However, the attendees misconstrue the incentive and believe that the club supports the release of Hat McCullough, who was convicted of murdering twenty-three infants.

The crowd focuses on persuading the governor to release McCullough, while the boys appear on Nightline to explain their motives. Spielberg and Lucas are also guests on the show, and when the boys mention altering Raiders of the Lost Ark, the two directors are convinced to do exactly that. Determined to stop them, the boys sneak into Lucas' house and steal the original negative for the film, but Lucas catches them. Lucas calls the police, and the boys attempt to convince him to defy Spielberg. As their attempts begin to sway him, Spielberg arrives, accompanied by guards, and Lucas reluctantly gives Spielberg the film. Stan, Kyle and Cartman are taken prisoner to be guests at the film's premiere, but Tweek escapes. At this point, a fictional trailer is shown for a remastered version of "Cartman Gets an Anal Probe", the first episode of South Park.

At the club, Tweek alerts everybody else to the situation at hand, but the crowd remains focused on McCullough. Meanwhile, Spielberg and Lucas, now joined by Francis Ford Coppola, travel to the premiere in a convoy with the film's print enclosed in an ark being carried. Tweek ambushes the convoy wielding a panzerfaust and threatens to launch it unless they release the other boys. The negotiation ends when Spielberg convinces Tweek that his life has been in pursuit of seeing a great film, and due to the additional effects, he wants to see it screened just as much as Spielberg does. Tweek hesitates to use the bazooka and is subsequently captured. At the premiere, Spielberg reveals his plan to destroy the original film as the premiere begins. Knowing the quality of the final result, the boys turn away while the audience reacts hostilely to the film. In a parody of Raiders' climax, the altered film kills Spielberg, Lucas, Coppola, and the assembled audience before sealing itself inside the ark. The boys open their eyes to find their bondages removed and Cartman remarks that the film "must've sucked balls."

Back in South Park, the boys believe that they are going to be congratulated for defeating Spielberg and Lucas. Instead, they are congratulated for McCullough's successful release from prison. Despite his derangement, McCullough is given a standing ovation and is presented with an infant who is implied to have been immediately killed. The boys realize that what they have done might not matter now, but may matter later. Tweek wonders if someone else will attempt to alter the film; Stan answers that it is "somewhere safe, somewhere where nobody will ever find it." Elsewhere, the original prints of the film are crated up and stored within a warehouse labeled "Red Cross 9/11 Relief Funds."

== Production ==
In the DVD commentary, the creators say that they think of classic films as art, and that art should not be changed to be politically correct. Stone comes out as "officially over Star Wars." Steven Spielberg wrote to Parker and Stone, saying he felt like he had "finally arrived now that he's one of the villains of South Park." Parker said that if he had anything to do with Spielberg not editing Raiders of the Lost Ark, he was "just as proud of that as wearing a dress to the Academy Awards."

== Home media ==
"Free Hat," along with the sixteen other episodes from South Park's sixth season, were released on a three-disc DVD set in the United States on October 11, 2005. The sets included brief audio commentaries by Parker and Stone for each episode. IGN gave the season a rating of 9/10.

== See also ==
- Changes in Star Wars re-releases
  - Han shot first
- "The China Probrem", which has similar themes to "Free Hat"
