= Montage (filmmaking) =

Sequence of short shots

Sergei Eisenstein editing the film "October" 1928.

A montage (/mɒnˈtɑːʒ/ mon-TAHZH) is a film editing technique in which a series of short shots are sequenced to condense space, time, and information. Montages enable filmmakers to communicate a large amount of information to an audience over a shorter span of time by juxtaposing different shots, compressing time through editing, or intertwining multiple storylines of a narrative.

The term has varied meanings depending on the filmmaking tradition. In French, the word montage applied to cinema simply denotes editing. In Soviet montage theory, as originally introduced outside the USSR by Sergei Eisenstein, it was used to create symbolism. Later, the term "montage sequence", used primarily by British and American studios, became the common technique to suggest the passage of time.

From the 1930s to the 1950s, montage sequences often combined numerous short shots with special optical effects (fades/dissolves, split screens, double and triple exposures), dance, and music.

== Development ==
"Film historians differentiate two parallel schools of montage, that of the Soviets and that of Hollywood. The Soviet tradition, primarily distinguished by the writing and film work by S. M. Eisenstein is seen as intellectual, objectively analytical, and perhaps overly academic. Hollywood montage, romantic in the extreme, is written off as a series of wipes, dissolves, flip-flops and superimpositions..." —Film historian Richard Koszarski in Hollywood Directors: 1914-1940 (1976)

The triptych montage finale of Napoléon.

One of the original films to innovate montage filmmaking was Abel Gance's 1927 film Napoléon. The film uses montage throughout and its triptych finale includes a row of three reels of film playing either a continuous image or a montage of separate shots. Sergei Eisentein credited Gance with inspiring his fascination with montage, a technique he would become well-known for:

The word "montage" came to identify...specifically the rapid, shock cutting that Eisenstein employed in his films. Its use survives to this day in the specially created "montage sequences" inserted into Hollywood films to suggest, in a blur of double exposures, the rise to fame of an opera singer or, in brief model shots, the destruction of an airplane, a city or a planet.

Two common montage devices used are newsreels and railroads. In the first, as in Citizen Kane, there are multiple shots of newspapers being printed (multiple layered shots of papers moving between rollers, papers coming off the end of the press, a pressman looking at a paper) and headlines zooming on to the screen telling whatever needs to be told. In a typical railroad montage, the shots include engines racing toward the camera, giant engine wheels moving across the screen, and long trains racing past the camera as destination signs fill the screen.

"Scroll montage" is a form of multiple-screen montage developed specifically for the moving image in a web browser. It plays with Italian theatre director Eugenio Barba's "space river" montage in which the spectators' attention is said to "[sail] on a tide of actions which their gaze [can never] fully encompass". "Scroll montage" is usually used in online audio-visual works in which sound and the moving image are separated and can exist autonomously: audio in these works is usually streamed on internet radio and video is posted on a separate site.

== Noted directors ==
Film critic Ezra Goodman discusses the contributions of Slavko Vorkapić, who worked at MGM and was the best-known montage specialist of the 1930s:

He devised vivid montages for numerous pictures, mainly to get a point across economically or to bridge a time lapse. In a matter of moments, with images cascading across the screen, he was able to show Jeanette MacDonald's rise to fame as an opera star in Maytime (1937), the outbreak of the revolution in Viva Villa (1934), the famine and exodus in The Good Earth (1937), and the plague in Romeo and Juliet (1936).

From 1933 to 1942, Don Siegel, later a noted feature film director, was the head of the montage department at Warner Brothers. He did montage sequences for hundreds of features, including Confessions of a Nazi Spy; Knute Rockne, All American; Blues in the Night; Yankee Doodle Dandy; Casablanca; Action in the North Atlantic; Gentleman Jim; and They Drive by Night.

Siegel told Peter Bogdanovich how his montages differed from the usual ones:

Montages were done then as they're done now, oddly enough—very sloppily. The director casually shoots a few shots that he presumes will be used in the montage and the cutter grabs a few stock shots and walks down with them to the man who's operating the optical printer and tells him to make some sort of mishmash out of it. He does, and that's what's labeled montage.

In contrast, Siegel would read the motion picture's script to find out the story and action, then take the script's one line description of the montage and write his own five page script. The directors and the studio bosses left him alone because no one could figure out what he was doing. Left alone with his own crew, he constantly experimented to find out what he could do. He also tried to make the montage match the director's style, dull for a dull director, exciting for an exciting director.

Of course, it was a most marvelous way to learn about films, because I made endless mistakes just experimenting with no supervision. The result was that a great many of the montages were enormously effective.

Siegel selected the montages he did for Yankee Doodle Dandy (1942), The Adventures of Mark Twain (1944), and Confessions of a Nazi Spy, as especially good ones. "I thought the montages were absolutely extraordinary in 'The Adventures of Mark Twain'—not a particularly good picture, by the way."

== Training montage ==
The training montage is a standard explanatory montage. It originated in American cinema but has since spread to modern martial arts films from East Asia. Originally depicting a character engaging in physical or sports training, the form has been extended to other activities or themes.

=== Conventions and clichés ===
The standard elements of a training montage include a build-up where the potential hero confronts his failure to train adequately. The solution is a serious, individual training regimen. The individual is shown engaging in training or learning through a series of short, cut sequences. An inspirational song (often fast-paced rock music) typically provides the only sound. At the end of the montage several weeks have elapsed in the course of just a few minutes and the hero is now prepared for the big competition or task. One of the best-known examples is the training sequence in the 1976 movie Rocky, which culminates in Rocky's run up the Rocky Steps of the Philadelphia Museum of Art.

Although originating in sports films, the training montage has been used to demonstrate training in a variety of challenging endeavors such as flying a jet (Armageddon, 1998), fighting (Bloodsport,1988; The Mask of Zorro, 1998; Batman Begins, 2005; Edge of Tomorrow, 2014), espionage (Spy Game, 2001), magic (Harry Potter and the Order of the Phoenix, 2007), and public speaking (The King's Speech, 2010).

The simplicity of the technique and its over-use in American film vocabulary has led to its status as a film cliché. A notable parody of the training montage appears in the South Park episode, "Asspen". When Stan Marsh must become an expert skier quickly, he begins training in a montage where the inspirational song explicitly spells out the techniques and requirements of a successful training montage sequence as they occur on screen. It was also spoofed in Team America: World Police in a similar sequence.

The music in these training montage scenes has garnered a cult following, with such artists as Robert Tepper, Stan Bush and Survivor appearing on several '80s soundtracks. Songs like Frank Stallone's "Far from Over", and John Farnham's "Break the Ice" are examples of high-energy rock songs that typify the music that appeared during montages in '80s action films. Indie rock band The Mountain Goats released a single in 2021 entitled "Training Montage", a homage to the eponymous cinematic trope.

== See also ==
- Bonnie and Clyde — 1967 film notable for its montage finale edited by Dede Allen
- Collage film — similar in content
- Video essay — similar in content
