= The Biggest Douche in the Universe =

- South Park episode
- Episode no.: Season 6 Episode 15
- Directed by: Trey Parker
- Written by: Trey Parker
- Production code: 615
- Original air date: November 27, 2002

Episode chronology
← Previous "The Death Camp of Tolerance"	Next → "My Future Self 'n' Me"
- South Park season 6

"The Biggest Douche in the Universe" is the fifteenth episode of the sixth season of the American animated series South Park, and the 94th episode of the series overall. It was first broadcast on Comedy Central on November 27, 2002, and was the last in a mini-arc depicting Cartman being occasionally possessed by Kenny. The episode is centered on Liane Cartman and Chef attempting to exorcise Kenny's soul while Stan tries to debunk self-proclaimed psychic John Edward, whom the entire crew of South Park Studios agreed to be "the biggest douche in the universe."

== Plot ==
Cartman is rushed to the hospital after again being possessed by Kenny, the first occurrence of which was in the episode "A Ladder to Heaven" when he mistook Kenny's ashes for chocolate milk mix. The doctor tells his mother Liane that Cartman is "running out of time", implying that Kenny is attempting to assert full control over Cartman's body. Upon hearing of all this, Chef decides to take everyone to the Crossing Over TV show in New York and have John Edward talk to Kenny from beyond the grave. At the show, Edward picks random names from the audience and makes vague educated guesses whenever a name proves to be relevant, but moves to a different person whenever his guesses are incorrect. When he approaches the boys, he merely makes uselessly vague statements about Kenny, and advises Kyle that his grandmother wants him to "look for four white doves."

Disappointed with Edward, Chef takes Cartman to his parents in Scotland and has them perform an exorcism. About to fly back to Colorado, Kyle spots a poster advertising a school called Jewleeard, with four white birds as its logo. Convinced, he rushes off to enroll himself. Stan goes to Edward's house, and offends him by trying to get him to admit that what he does is not real, and calls him a "douche" and "the biggest douche in the universe" for giving false hopes to people who are grieving. Before Stan leaves, he steals some of Edward's books, to learn more about cold reading. In an attempt to persuade Kyle that Edward is a fake, Stan demonstrates cold reading on some passersby as they stand in the street but the plan backfires when the crowd believes that Stan actually has psychic powers, and he is immediately given his own show where he tries unsuccessfully to demonstrate to his audience how cold reading works and that psychic powers are not real. This prompts Edward to challenge Stan to a psychic showdown.

Meanwhile, Chef's parents successfully exorcise Kenny's spirit from Cartman, but since Chef has not brought a "victim child" into which to transfer the spirit, it flies around their house before occupying a pot roast. Cartman returns to his normal self and Chef's parents give him the roast to take back to South Park. However, Chef, Cartman, and Liane end up forgetting to claim the pot roast at the baggage claim in the airport.

At the psychic showdown, Stan finally convinces Kyle and much of the audience that, although it may be comforting to think of their deceased relatives talking to them, such a fate isn't a particularly desirable one, especially if it means that they have to talk to Edward. A large spacecraft suddenly crashes through the studio roof. The Intergalactic BDIU Committee, made up of several different aliens, comes to take Edward to the award ceremony for they have accepted Stan's nomination he unintentionally made earlier. Once taken there, Edward wins the 478th annual "Biggest Douche in the Universe" award, despite throughout the entire episode yelling "I am not a douche!", beating a variety of aliens including one that is literally a giant douche.

Throughout the episode, fictional trailers play for Rob Schneider's latest comedy vehicles. Near the end of the episode a trailer is shown wherein Schneider finds the abandoned pot roast and eats it, thus allowing Kenny's spirit to possess him. The resulting movie shows him living out Kenny's former life until he is shot and impaled on a flag pole.

== Production ==
At the time of this episode's original broadcast, Rob Schneider was about to star in The Hot Chick, and had already starred in The Animal. Commercials for The Hot Chick showed while the episode originally aired, and the South Park creators parodied the format of the commercial. The running gag is that all of the fictional trailers follow the same basic plot: a man is somehow transformed, whether it be into an animal, a woman, a stapler, or a carrot. This point is furthered in the episode with a trailer clearly showing a plot exactly the same as these, but with almost every word spoken in gibberish. The term derp that is used in one of the Rob Schneider trailers (and would later become a popular term on the Internet) was coined when South Park creators Trey Parker and Matt Stone were shooting the movie BASEketball; a derp is "a stupid joke that you could see a mile away," commenting on their criticism of Schneider's movies. Mr. Derp, for example, was the name of Chef's replacement in "The Succubus".

The episode title, "The Biggest Douche in the Universe," refers to the self-proclaimed psychic John Edward, and was referred to by Penn Jillette in his and Teller's show, Penn & Teller: Bullshit!. Penn and Teller are friends of Trey Parker and Matt Stone and have stated that this is their favorite episode. According to the commentary for this episode, Trey Parker described the creation of the episode as being centered on John Edward, who the entire crew of South Park Studios agreed was "the biggest douche in the universe." That was until Matt Stone asked the question "Well, what about Rob Schneider?", leading to the fictional trailers. Parker and Stone credit James Randi with Stan's explanation of cold reading.
