= A Ladder to Heaven =

- South Park episode
- Episode no.: Season 6 Episode 12
- Directed by: Trey Parker
- Written by: Trey Parker
- Production code: 612
- Original air date: November 6, 2002

Episode chronology
← Previous "Child Abduction Is Not Funny"	Next → "The Return of the Fellowship of the Ring to the Two Towers"
- South Park season 6

"A Ladder to Heaven" is the twelfth episode of the sixth season and the 91st overall episode of the Comedy Central series South Park. It was originally broadcast on November 6, 2002.

In the episode, the boys try to build a ladder to heaven to retrieve a winning ticket Kenny had before he died. When their efforts are mistaken for an act of childhood innocence, a media circus ensues.

== Plot ==
Stan, Kyle and Cartman win an all-you-can-grab candy prize, but cannot claim it without the stub of the ticket they bought. They remember that they gave the ticket stub to Kenny to hold on to before he last died. Upon visiting Kenny's house, the boys are shown an urn containing his ashes, which they steal during the next night. However, having never heard of cremation, they expect to find Kenny's body and are confused when they find ashes inside. Cartman assumes it must be some kind of chocolate milk powder. He mixes the ashes with milk and drinks them, replacing the ashes with kitty litter in the urn.

The boys decide to build a ladder to heaven to find Kenny so he can hand them the ticket. However, when questioned about why they are building the ladder, they neglect to mention that candy is involved and merely say they want to see Kenny again. As a result, the adults, thinking that the boys desperately want to see their dead friend again, are touched and the ladder's construction grips the whole country. Singer Alan Jackson turns up to memorialize the event in song.

The Japanese even start building a rival ladder of their own so that when the boys announce they have run out of stuff to build the ladder, the United States military arrives and starts to build a reinforced tower in order to beat the Japanese. The ladder eventually reaches above the clouds and the boys are disappointed when they see nothing.

Suspicious photos taken of heavenly clouds are reported to the U.S. president as indicating a potential factory making weapons of mass destruction run by Saddam Hussein, now dead and permanently living in Heaven. The U.S. decides to bomb Heaven, believing Hussein to be building nuclear warheads there. President George W. Bush explains the Satan–Saddam–Chris love triangle story to a skeptical United Nations General Assembly.

Meanwhile, Cartman starts viewing Kenny's memories every time something hits his head. After the adults try to tell the boys to get back to their lives and explain cremation to them, Cartman realizes that this is because he drank Kenny's ashes. After getting intentionally hit on the head a few more times, Cartman witnesses Kenny locking up the ticket in a box he kept in his room. The boys retrieve the stub, collect their confectionery, and lose all interest in the ladder. The whole misunderstanding is explained, and various platitudes exchanged that they all want to believe that they can go to heaven when they die, but the meaning is to enjoy life on Earth, which Alan Jackson tries and fails to turn into an umpteenth song. As they all leave, Cartman believes he only has Kenny's memories, but when Cartman insults himself in Kenny's words, he and the other boys realize that Kenny's soul really is trapped in Cartman's body.

In a final scene, it is revealed that Saddam Hussein is in fact building a WMD factory, disguised as a chocolate chip factory, and is lying to God about it.

== Production ==
Singer Alan Jackson is parodied for his country hit "Where Were You (When the World Stopped Turning)" about the September 11 attacks; Matt Stone felt Jackson was "cashing in on the sentimentality of [remembering the 9/11 attacks]".

== Home media ==
"A Ladder to Heaven", along with the sixteen other episodes from South Park's sixth season, were released on a three-disc DVD set in the United States on October 11, 2005. The sets included brief audio commentaries by Trey Parker and Stone for each episode. IGN gave the season a rating of 9/10.
