= Simpsons Already Did It =

- South Park episode
- Butters (not pictured) imagines Cartman, Kyle, and Stan (left to right) as Simpsons characters
- Episode no.: Season 6 Episode 7
- Directed by: Trey Parker
- Written by: Trey Parker
- Production code: 607
- Original air date: June 26, 2002

Episode chronology
← Previous "Professor Chaos"	Next → "Red Hot Catholic Love"
- South Park season 6

"Simpsons Already Did It" is the seventh episode of the sixth season of the American animated television series South Park and the 86th episode of the series overall. It originally aired on Comedy Central in the United States on June 26, 2002. In the episode, which continues on from the events of the previous episode "Professor Chaos", Butters thinks up a series of schemes to take over the world, but realizes that each one has already been performed on the show The Simpsons. Meanwhile, Ms. Choksondik dies and Cartman, Kyle and Stan think that they are responsible.

== Plot ==
Butters, as Professor Chaos, concocts various schemes to destroy South Park, only to learn that each one has already been the plot point to an episode of The Simpsons. Such schemes include blocking out the sun, beheading the statue in the town square, and conning the town into building a monorail. After watching the whole series, he devises an original plan, only for The Simpsons to feature it in a new episode that night. This drives Butters to a mental breakdown, where he hallucinates his surroundings in The Simpsons art style.

Meanwhile, Cartman buys a package of "Sea People", believing they will be intelligent creatures, only to realize they are merely brine shrimp. Underwhelmed, the boys use them to spike Ms. Choksondik's coffee as a prank. She dies the next day, with the boys believing they were responsible because "semen was found in her stomach." They break into the morgue to remove the semen from her corpse, which Cartman then combines with the brine shrimp. This evolves the shrimp into an intelligent civilization that worships Cartman as a god.

When Butters tries to claim the boys' "sea-ciety" is unoriginal because The Simpsons did it first, the boys simply don't care, noting that the show has done everything anyway, and that The Simpsons got the idea from an episode of The Twilight Zone. This logic cures Butters' neurosis. Ultimately, the sea people society destroys itself in a nuclear war over a religious schism between Cartman and Tweek.

== Production ==
"Simpsons Already Did It" was inspired by the fact that The Simpsons did in fact beat South Park to several plot concepts. In the season 4 episode "The Wacky Molestation Adventure", Cartman was supposed to block out the sun, but one writer pointed out that "The Simpsons already did it". The episode "calls out" the obvious observation that The Simpsons have realized a vast number of ideas throughout their long-lived run. Some have found a certain reciprocity to this statement, finding instances of repetitiveness in The Simpsons itself while quoting South Park.

The Simpsons crew has a friendly relationship with South Park, which they demonstrated several times, going as far as sending flowers to the South Park studios when South Park parodied Family Guy in the season 10 episodes "Cartoon Wars Part I" and "Part II". In 2010, The Simpsons crew congratulated South Park for reaching 200 episodes, with a message reading "Congratulations on 200 Episodes. (We Already Did It.) (Twice.)".

Soon after, in reference to the controversies and terrorist threats surrounding depictions of the Muslim prophet Muhammad in the South Park episodes "200" and "201", the chalkboard gag on that week's The Simpsons episode, "The Squirt and the Whale", read "South Park – we'd stand beside you if we weren't so scared".

South Park was parodied in a 2003 Simpsons episode, "The Bart of War", showing a scene with three of the South Park boys Stan, Kyle and Cartman drawn in Simpsons style, with Marge disapproving of Bart and Milhouse's apparent enjoyment of "cartoon violence", and the latter two contemplating about adults voicing children's characters. The 2009 Simpsons episode "O Brother, Where Bart Thou?" has Bart, Milhouse, Nelson and Ralph dressed up as the four main South Park boys, standing at the bus stop – similarly to the iconic bus stop scenes of South Park –, and Otto using the catchphrase "Oh my God! I killed Kenny!" when he hits Ralph (dressed as Kenny) driving the school bus.

== Reception ==
The episode received generally positive reviews. Travis Pickett of IGN gave it an 8.5 rating, especially praising Trey Parker and Matt Stone for managing to contrast the episode with the actual Simpsons with themes like Cartman performing fellatio on "some guy in an alley", while respectfully paying their dues.
