= Jennifer Howell =

Canadian voice actress

Jennifer Howell is a Canadian voice actress. She is the voice of Bebe Stevens on the animated television series South Park. She was also the show's supervising producer.

From November 2005 to June 2008, Howell was the Executive Vice President of Matt Stone and Trey Parker's production company Important Films.

Howell is now heading up 20th Century Fox Television's animation department as its Senior Vice President.
