= Grounding (discipline technique) =

Disciplinary action usually taken in the home by parents against children

Grounding, or house arrest, is a general discipline technique throughout the Western world, particularly in the Anglosphere of the United States and Canada, which restricts children or adolescents at home from going out or pursuing their favorite activities, except for any obligations (school, doctor's/dental appointments, church services, exercise within a specific radius, etc.). Moreover, any positive reinforcement and anything the parents may define as "privileges" (phone, computer (except for schoolwork), television, toys, restaurants, dessert, etc.) are often revoked.

Grounding is used as an alternative to physical discipline, e.g., spanking, for behavior management in the home. According to a 2000 review on child outcomes, "Grounding has been replicated as a more effective disciplinary alternative than spanking with adolescents with challenging behavior." Grounding can backfire if the type and duration of restrictions are disproportionately severe for the behavior meant to be corrected, or if the restrictions are too difficult for the parent to enforce due to resistance.

== Origin ==
This term was used initially in aviation: when a pilot is prevented from flying an aircraft due to misconduct, illness, technical issues with the aircraft, or other reasons, the pilot is "grounded" – that is, literally confined to the ground.
