= Red Sleigh Down =

- South Park episode
- Episode no.: Season 6 Episode 17
- Directed by: Trey Parker
- Written by: Trey Parker
- Production code: 617
- Original air date: December 11, 2002

Episode chronology
← Previous "My Future Self 'n' Me"	Next → "Cancelled"
- South Park season 6

"Red Sleigh Down" is the seventeenth episode of the sixth season of the American animated series South Park, and the 96th episode of the series overall. It was first broadcast on Comedy Central on December 11, 2002.

In the episode, Cartman has to score one big "nice" on Santa's list to be eligible for Christmas presents. He recruits Santa, Mr. Hankey, and Jesus in a desperate attempt to bring Christmas to the downtrodden citizens of Iraq. Things go awry and when Santa is shot down in Iraq, Jesus comes to his aid.

This episode is notable for the return of Kenny from his death in season five because fans were so upset over his absence throughout the season. The title and episode parody the films Black Hawk Down and Three Kings, and Lethal Weapon is referenced during an interrogation scene.

== Plot ==
Cartman has Kyle's cousin perform a tally of his naughty and nice deeds. He informs Cartman that he has been too naughty to earn his coveted Christmas gift, a Haibo robot dog. In order to reverse his past misdeeds, he sets out to spread Christmas cheer to the people of Iraq. Meanwhile, at a tree lighting ceremony, Jimmy Valmer is given the honor of lighting, but first decides to sing "The Twelve Days of Christmas". Due to his stutter, it takes most of the episode for him to reach the end of the twelve verses.

With the use of Mr. Hankey's Poo-Choo train, Cartman and the other boys travel to the North Pole to convince Santa Claus to bring Christmas to Iraq. With the assistance of the Underpants Gnomes, Santa prepares his sleigh and travels to Iraq, only to be promptly shot down, brought in, and tortured. The boys realize that Cartman's little ploy may have ended Christmas for everyone and set out to make things right.

Taking a backup sled, they seek out Jesus. Upon hearing the news, Jesus promptly arms himself with an array of automatic weapons and travels with the boys to Iraq, brutally gunning down everyone who impedes him. The group breaks into the interrogation room and frees Santa.

As they make their way back to the sleigh, Jesus is shot dead by one Iraqi captor. Outraged, Santa kills the soldier, and proceeds to blast his way out. Back on the sleigh, Santa flies the children back to South Park, but not before covering Iraq in Christmas decorations.

Much to the town's delight, Jimmy finally finishes his song and switches on the Christmas tree, only for the lights to then blow a fuse. At that moment though, Santa flies past the tree and magically restores them.

Santa returns the boys home, hoping that people will always remember Jesus on this day. He gives the children all Haibo dogs as thanks, but Cartman is disgusted, as he wanted to be the only kid owning one and have his friends envy him. Kenny McCormick then shows up out of nowhere (his first appearance since "Kenny Dies"), though the three seem unfazed by this.

== Production ==
This episode came from the idea of Black Hawk Down with Santa Claus. The creators had always planned to bring Kenny back in the last episode due to fan demand to see more Kenny, but they killed off Jesus (who dies to save Santa) the idea being that's why at Christmas time we think about Jesus.

Santa's house in the North Pole is Superman's Fortress of Solitude from Superman II.

== Home media ==
"Red Sleigh Down", along with the sixteen other episodes from South Park's sixth season, were released on a three-disc DVD set in the United States on October 11, 2005. The sets included brief audio commentaries by Parker and Stone for each episode. IGN gave the season a rating of 9/10.

The episode was also included on the DVD compilation Christmas Time in South Park.
