= Chef (South Park) =

Jerome McElroy
- South Park character
- First appearance: "Cartman Gets an Anal Probe" (1997)
- Last appearance: The Stick of Truth (2014)
- Created by: Trey Parker; Matt Stone
- Voiced by: Isaac Hayes; Trey Parker (singing, in "Succubus"); Peter Serafinowicz (Darth Chef)

In-universe information
- Alias: Abdul Mohammed Jabar Rauf Kareem Ali (in "Chef Goes Nanners")
- Occupation: School Cafeteria chef
- Family: Nellie McElroy (mother); Thomas McElroy (father)
- Significant other: Veronica (Ex-fiancée)
- Nationality: American
- Residence: South Park, Colorado

Jerome "Chef" McElroy, often referred to as just Chef, is a fictional character on the Comedy Central series South Park who was voiced by Isaac Hayes. A cafeteria worker at the local elementary school in the town of South Park, Colorado, Chef is generally portrayed as more intelligent than the other adult residents of the town, and understanding to the children. His advice is often sought by the show's core group of child protagonists —Stan Marsh, Kyle Broflovski, Eric Cartman, and Kenny McCormick — as he is the only adult they completely trust. He frequently gives completely honest advice without considering whether it is appropriate for children, usually in the non sequitur form of a lascivious soul song.

Chef was inspired by Hayes and other popular soul singers of the 1970s, as well as an actual dining hall worker encountered by series co-creator Trey Parker while he attended the University of Colorado. Chef played a less prominent role as the series progressed beyond its earlier seasons, and the character was retired at the beginning of the tenth season in "The Return of Chef" following the controversial departure of Hayes.

== Character ==
In tradition with the show's animation style, Chef is composed of simple geometrical shapes, and is animated with use of a computer, though he is given the impression of being a construction paper cutout composition animated through the use of stop motion, which was the technique used to animate the "Spirit of Christmas" shorts and the show's first episode. Chef is an overweight African American with a beard who usually wears blue pants and a red shirt. He frequently dons a traditional chef's hat and white apron on which the word "CHEF" is printed in black, even when he is not at work.

Until Tolkien Black and his family were given a more notable role starting in the show's fourth season, Chef was portrayed as the only black resident in all of South Park. Parker and co-creator Matt Stone initially planned to have one of themselves voice the character, fearing that their ideal candidates of Hayes, Lou Rawls, and Barry White would never agree to voice the character because the duo had admittedly and purposefully created him as a "stereotype" to reflect what they felt was the perception most inhabitants of less-diverse mountainous Colorado towns had of black people. However, Hayes agreed to voice the character due in part to the audacity of some of the show's early scripts. Chef (usually affectionately) referred to most people in town with the pejorative "crackers", including the children.

Chef, after abandoning his musical aspirations, moved to South Park with plans to open his own restaurant. Before this, he had befriended several famous recording artists in the music industry, including Elton John and Meat Loaf, helping them to launch their successful careers. Despite failing at yet another dream, Chef made his way onto the South Park City Council, representing Public Safety. In addition to dispensing wisdom to the children and a few of the adult townsfolk, Chef speaks out against what he feels are outrageous ideas. For example, he opposes the rampant prescription of Ritalin in the episode "Timmy 2000", and he objects to the town's acceptance of Mr. Garrison committing purposefully flamboyant sadomasochistic acts in front of schoolchildren in "The Death Camp of Tolerance". In "Chef Goes Nanners", he briefly converts to Islam and adopted the name "Abdul Mohammed Jabar Rauf Kareem Ali" when he demanded that South Park change its official flag because it depicted the town's racist past. On several other occasions, Chef helped save South Park (and in a few other instances, the entire world) from potential disasters.

Chef is also known for frequently engaging in casual sex, a habit he often expresses through song. He drives a 1980s woodie station wagon with a vanity plate that reads "LUV CHEF". He is often seen accompanied by numerous young women when at home or on vacation, and is even revealed to have had a one-night stand with Kathie Lee Gifford. He once resorted to male prostitution in an effort to raise money to pay legal fees, and had sex with nearly every woman in South Park before having to stop due to exhaustion. In "The Succubus", Chef briefly becomes an office worker and took up monogamy after meeting a woman named Veronica. The two were engaged to be married until it was revealed that Veronica was actually a succubus. In the South Park video game, the children can seek Chef's advice at one of the many buildings labelled "Chef's Shack O' Love", which is implied to be a brothel, complete with a naked woman in Chef's bed.

Chef's parents, Nellie and Thomas McElroy, live in Scotland. The couple have made two major appearances in the episodes "The Succubus" and "The Biggest Douche in the Universe", and made a brief cameo in a town Christmas celebration in "Red Sleigh Down". They were not seen at Chef's funeral in "The Return of Chef".

Chef is known to have run a quiz show called Chef's Luv Shack, as is apparent in the video game of the same name.

== Relationship with the children ==
Chef endearingly calls the boys "the children" or just "children" (even when addressing one individually), and, unless he is preoccupied with a female companion, is usually willing to assist them with whatever help they need. He is consistently the only adult in town who the boys held in high regard, and they view him as their friend. They are also visibly saddened if his presence in their lives is threatened. In addition to being fans of his food (especially his trademark Salisbury steak), the boys often heartily anticipate encountering Chef when waiting in the school lunch line, so that they can explain whatever dilemma is affecting them, usually after their traditional greeting:

Chef: Hello there, children!
The boys [in unison]: Hey Chef!
Chef: How's it goin'?
The boys [one or in unison]: Bad.
Chef: Why "bad"?

The boys sometimes take it upon themselves to travel to Chef's house individually to seek his guidance on all manners of their problems, specifically relationships. He usually gives advice in the form of a soul song, which usually winds up being about sex, whether or not sex was relevant to the topic at hand. Hearing the songs would often leave the boys even more confused and with no further understanding of what they initially inquire about. In earlier seasons, Chef is often approached by the children when they are unfamiliar with a term that pertains to adult matters, such as "lesbian" or "prostitute". This happens so often that it eventually angers Chef, who pleads with them to stop asking questions he feels are not appropriate for him to answer. Despite this, the children continue asking these questions, much to his chagrin. An absent-minded Chef sometimes answers anyway, not realizing his lapse until the damage had been done. Chef acknowledges that doing this had repeatedly gotten him in trouble with his boss, Principal Victoria.

== Music ==
In addition to singing in an effort to explain something to the children, Chef also sings about things relevant to what has transpired in the plot. These songs were original compositions written by Parker, and performed by Hayes in the same sexually suggestive R&B style he had utilized during his own music career. Within the show, Chef is the original composer of these songs, including "Stinky Britches", which was depicted as having been covered by Alanis Morissette without proper credit to Chef. When Chef is left with legal debt after losing a court case to have himself credited as the song's original writer, several bands and artists (guest starring as themselves) hold a concert dubbed "Chef Aid", a parody of Live Aid, to raise the funds. The episode inspired a real-life album, Chef Aid: The South Park Album, which featured guest stars from the episode such as Elton John and Ozzy Osbourne. The album includes many of the full-length versions of the songs Chef had performed in the show's first two seasons; "Chocolate Salty Balls" was released as a single, and reached #1 in both the record charts of Ireland and the United Kingdom. As the series progressed and Chef's role became more intermittent, his spontaneous outbursts into song became less of a show standard.

Parker and Stone originally planned to have Chef sing a song in every single episode but abandoned the idea after finding it too challenging and fearing writing too many songs would make them less funny, similar to their rationale for dispensing with Kenny's episodic deaths.

== Departure of Isaac Hayes ==
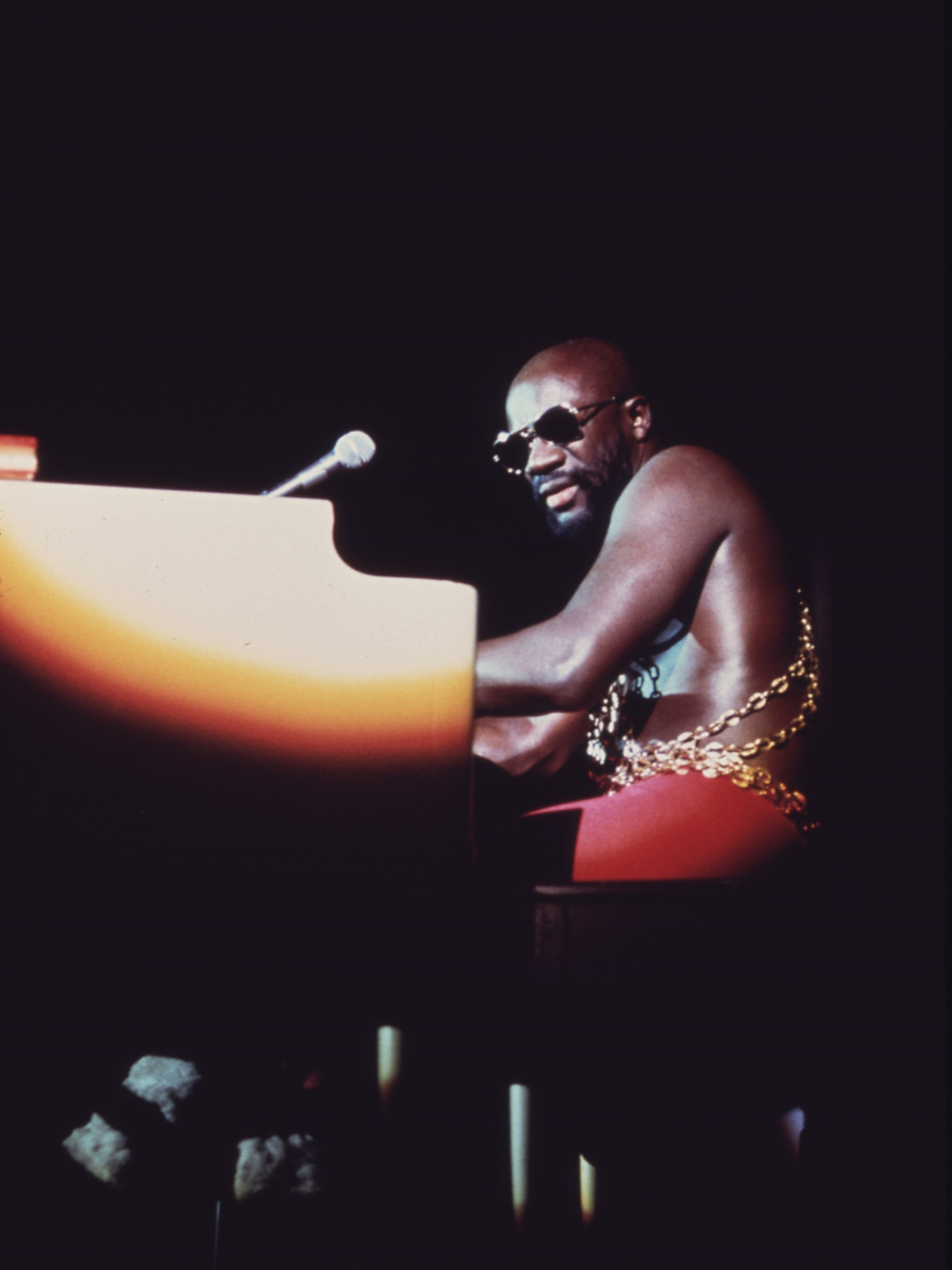
Isaac Hayes provided the voice of Chef

On January 4, 2006, Hayes defended South Park's style of controversial humor to The A.V. Club and XM's Opie and Anthony show, going so far as to note that although he was not pleased with the show's depiction of the Church of Scientology, of which he was a member, he "understood what Matt and Trey are doing." However, on March 13, 2006, nearly two months after suffering a stroke, Hayes was reported to have quit South Park over objections to the show's attitudes toward and depiction of various religions, claiming that the show had crossed the line from satire into intolerance.

Despite the content of the official press release, there remains considerable speculation about the motivations behind his departure. Parker and Stone assert that he quit due to the controversial episode "Trapped in the Closet", and its treatment of Scientology. Stone commented in a manner that suggested that Hayes practiced a double standard regarding the treatment of religion on South Park: "[We] never heard a peep out of Isaac in any way until we [lampooned] Scientology. He wants a different standard for religions other than his own, and to me, that is where intolerance and bigotry begin." Fox News reporter Roger Friedman suggested that, because he was still suffering from the effects of his stroke, Hayes was hospitalized and not in a position to make a rational decision to leave the show. Friedman also reported that Hayes left the show because of the external pressure forced by his fellow Scientologists, the decision was not voluntary, and the original press release announcing his departure was put out by someone who was not authorized to represent him. In a 2016 oral history of South Park in The Hollywood Reporter, Hayes' son Isaac Hayes III alleged that the decision to leave the show was made by Hayes' entourage while Hayes was unable to make such decisions on his own. Hayes III reiterated this on his Twitter account in July 2025, remarking his father's love for the role and the show and affirming that Scientologists who didn't have his best interests at heart quit the show for him in the wake of his stroke. Despite later alleging that he believed the idea that Hayes' Scientology associates were responsible for his departure, Matt Stone had conceded in March 2006 that Hayes' departure was indeed a personal rebuke of "Trapped in the Closet"'s portrayal of Scientology, stating "This is 100 percent having to do with his faith of Scientology. ... He has no problem ... with our show making fun of Christians."

== Retirement ==
"Darth" Chef, voiced by Darth Maul original voice actor Peter Serafinowicz.

Nine days after Hayes's departure from production, the controversy was satirized in the show's Season 10 premiere "The Return of Chef". For the episode, voice clips of Chef were taken from previous episodes and linked together to form new dialogue to support the plot, which involves Chef's leaving South Park to join the "Super Adventure Club", which eventually brainwashes Chef until he had the mindset of a child molester. The organization combines outdoor activities with child molestation, an act they perceive as justified because of their beliefs.

After the boys are unable to convince Chef to come back to South Park, a rope bridge Chef is walking across is struck by lightning. He falls to a violent death, culminating with his mutilation at the hands of a grizzly bear and a mountain lion and finally discharged fecal matter (a reference to the episode "Something Wall-Mart This Way Comes", in which Cartman claims that the relaxation of the bowel muscles confirms that a person is really dead).

South Park holds a memorial service for him (Canadian comedians Terrance and Phillip even attend, despite having never met the man themselves), in which Kyle gives a eulogy stating, "We shouldn't be mad at Chef for leaving us, we should be mad at that fruity little club for scrambling his brains", a deliberate parallel with Hayes' departure from the show in favor of Scientology.

Mimicking a scene from the finale of Star Wars: Episode III – Revenge of the Sith, Chef's body is secretly collected by the Super Adventure Club, who managed to revive him as a cyborg — identified on the show's official website as "Darth Chef" (a parody of Star Wars' Darth Vader). He is fitted with a suit and mask like those of Vader, except with the helmet taking on the appearance of Chef's trademark hat, and wields a red, glowing spatula, parodying Vader's red lightsaber. Darth Chef's voice was provided by British comedian and filmmaker Peter Serafinowicz, who voiced Darth Maul in Star Wars: Episode I – The Phantom Menace. Darth Chef has not made an appearance in subsequent episodes, but has appeared with other characters in the background of the South Park opening sequence.

Chef is alluded to after his death in the season 10 episode "Hell on Earth 2006" where, during Satan's party, there are multiple scenes in which a Caucasian male dressed as Chef can be seen in the background. He is also referenced in the season 14 episode "Crème Fraiche" when Randy becomes the new chef at school and greets the kids with Chef's trademark lines. Chef's death is also indirectly mentioned in the season 19 episode "Stunning and Brave" when PC Principal talks about all the things he finds offensive (incorrectly assuming that Chef's death was a suicide, before giving Butters detention for correcting him). Hayes died on August 10, 2008, two years after his departure from South Park.

Chef makes an appearance in the 2014 video game South Park: The Stick of Truth as the reanimated Nazi zombie penultimate boss later in the game. Once again, voice clips of Hayes as Chef are recycled from past episodes with the exception of recorded speech clips from Adolf Hitler. During his battle with the player and the other boys, Chef will express remorse by saying things like "I'm sorry, boys" and "what have I done?" While there were vague references to the Super Adventure Club and his death, there were no references to the Darth Chef suit. After being defeated, Chef regains control over his mind and tries to tell the boys, but he is then killed by Clyde and the New Kid.

=== Instagram reels ===
Beginning October 1, 2026, reels of Chef, sitting in a chair with his back towards the camera, were posted on the Instagram pages of both Hayes and his son, Isaac Hayes III. It was not known if South Park Studios had done the animation, or who provided the character's voice.
