= Kenny Dies =

- South Park episode
- Episode no.: Season 5 Episode 13
- Directed by: Trey Parker
- Written by: Trey Parker
- Production code: 513
- Original air date: December 5, 2001

Episode chronology
← Previous "Here Comes the Neighborhood"	Next → "Butters' Very Own Episode"
- South Park season 5

"Kenny Dies" is the thirteenth episode of the fifth season of the animated television series South Park, and the 78th episode of the series overall. "Kenny Dies" originally aired in the United States on December 5, 2001, on Comedy Central. In the episode, Eric Cartman comes across a truckload of fetuses he cannot sell due to a recent government ruling on stem cell research. When Kenny McCormick is diagnosed with a terminal illness, Cartman uses it to lobby Congress to restore stem cell research.

The episode was written and directed by series co-creator Trey Parker and is rated TV-MA in the United States, except on syndicated broadcasts and post-2017 reruns on Comedy Central, where the episode is instead rated TV-14. The gag of Kenny dying in almost every episode was dropped after this episode, and he did not reappear bodily until "Red Sleigh Down", due to fans being upset over his absence throughout season 6 in 2002. This was the final appearance of the "4th Grade" title sequence, which was first seen in "4th Grade." On the DVD commentary for the episode, Parker and Matt Stone state that they had originally planned to kill Kyle off for a year, but decided to kill Kenny instead as they were running out of original ways to kill him.

== Plot ==
At an abortion clinic, a woman is giving her permission for scientists to use her dead fetus for stem cell research. However, during the transport of the fetuses, the driver swerves and falls off a mountain road due to a deer running across the road. Cartman happens to be passing the crash at this moment, and he notices the fetuses from the truck. He then steals the fetuses and starts calling companies he hopes to sell them to for a huge profit.

Meanwhile, the boys find out that Kenny has been diagnosed with a terminal muscular disease. The town is saddened by the news, and everyone except Stan tries their best to be there for Kenny. Stan, however, is too upset and cannot bring himself to visit Kenny in the hospital.

Upon learning about stem cell research, Cartman realizes that it might also be used to help Kenny recover from his illness, although he is informed that the government has just banned stem cell research. He then thinks that stem cells could also be used to duplicate a "Shakey's Pizza," although the researcher tells him otherwise.

To repeal the ban, Cartman goes to Congress and gives a speech to the House of Representatives about how his best friend, Kenny, might be saved through stem cell research. The House of Representatives committee then lifts the ban after Cartman sings "Heat of the Moment". Cartman then begins visiting abortion clinics throughout the area to collect even more aborted fetuses.

Meanwhile, after Chef gives Stan a lecture on death and why God lets it happen at any time, Stan finally comes to terms with Kenny dying. Stan goes to the hospital only to find Kenny's bed empty, and Kyle confirms that Kenny passed away. Stan then asks what Kenny's last words were, to which Kyle replies, "Where's Stan?"

At the funeral, Stan feels extremely guilty about not seeing Kenny before he died and considers himself Kenny's worst friend. However, Cartman comes rushing in and drags Stan and Kyle out of the ceremony to see a "miracle" that has just occurred. The boys are shocked and disgusted to see that, instead of using the stem cells to save Kenny, Cartman used them to duplicate a Shakey's Pizza. Kyle, furious that Cartman used Kenny's illness and death just so he could have his own Shakey's, furiously beats him, while Stan feels better knowing it was Cartman who was Kenny's worst friend.

== Reception ==
Serene Dominic of the Detroit Metro Times called the scene where Cartman leads members of the United States Congress in a sing-along of "Heat of the Moment" as the "Greatest Cartoon Moment" in the career of the original four members of Asia. In an article for ESPN.com, Tim Kavanagh discussed stem cells and how they were used in the episode, writing, "This, as with many other important topics of our day, I learned from "South Park," specifically Episode 513, entitled 'Kenny Dies.'" In a review of the South Park season 5 DVD release, Choire Sicha of The New York Times gave a "not-so-surprising surprise ending alert" that "Kenny finally really dies" at the end of the episode. Alessandra Stanley of The New York Times cited the episode when noting that the political commentary on South Park, like The Simpsons and Freak Show, was genuinely "provocative" satire, unlike the "safer ... mainstream iconoclasm" of Saturday Night Live.

== Home media ==
"Kenny Dies", along with the thirteen other episodes from South Park: the Complete Fifth Season, was released on a three-disc DVD set in the United States on February 22, 2005. The set includes brief audio commentaries by Parker and Stone for each episode.
