= Butters Stotch =

Fictional character from South Park

Leopold "Butters" Stotch
- South Park character
- First appearance: "Cartman Gets an Anal Probe" (1997)
- Created by: Trey Parker; Matt Stone; Eric Stough
- Based on: Eric Stough
- Designed by: Trey Parker; Matt Stone
- Voiced by: Matt Stone; Skylar James Sandak (young)

In-universe information
- Full name: Leopold Stotch
- Aliases: Swanson; Butters Stotch; Marjorine; Professor Chaos; Victor Chaos; The Last of the Meheecans
- Gender: Male
- Occupation: Student, Willy's Chilly Ice Cream Parlor worker, Pimp, Denny's Applebee's Max manager (future)
- Family: Stephen Stotch (father); Linda Stotch (mother)
- Significant others: Red McArthur (ex-girlfriend); Charlotte (ex-girlfriend)
- Relatives: Grandma Stotch (grandmother); Bud Stotch (uncle); Nellie Stotch (aunt); Larry (uncle); Elbert (first cousin once removed)
- Nationality: American, Hawaiian
- Birthday: September 11, in Lihue, Hawaii
- Residence: South Park, Colorado, United States

Leopold "Butters" Stotch is a fictional character in the adult animated television sitcom South Park. He is loosely based on co-producer Eric Stough and his voice is provided by co-creator Matt Stone. He is a student at South Park Elementary School.

Butters is depicted as more naïve, optimistic, and gullible than the show's other child characters and can become increasingly anxious, especially when faced with the threat of being grounded, which terrifies him. As a result, he is often sheltered and unknowledgeable of some of the suggestive content his peers understand, and is also frequently bullied and used by Eric Cartman.

Butters debuted as a background character named Puff Puff when South Park first premiered on Comedy Central on August 13, 1997. His role gradually increased, becoming one of the series' most frequently present characters beginning with Season 3 and eventually the de facto fifth main character by season 6. Creators Trey Parker and Matt Stone have stated that he is one of their favorite characters.

== Role in South Park ==
Butters was born in Hawaii and moved to South Park prior to preschool. Butters attends South Park Elementary as part of Mr. Garrison's 4th grade class. Storyboards and scripts for Seasons 1 and 2 had his original names as "Puff Puff" and "Swanson" respectively. In "AWESOM-O", he says his birthday is on September 11. He learns from his parents in "Going Native" that he was born on the island of Kaua'i. During the show's first 58 episodes ("Cartman Gets an Anal Probe" through Season 4 episode "4th Grade" in 2000), Butters and the other main child characters were in the third grade. He lives in South Park, Colorado as the only child and son of Stephen and Linda Stotch, from whom he perpetually faces the looming prospect of being grounded and abused. When the character of Kenny McCormick was temporarily written off the show near the end of Season 5, Stan Marsh, Kyle Broflovski, and Eric Cartman allow Butters into their group as the "fourth friend", a role he continued to fill until midway through Season 6, namely, the episode "Professor Chaos". During this period, the boys would often take advantage of Butters' mild temperament by making him a stooge in their own personal schemes, especially Cartman's. The three eventually ousted him in favor of Tweek Tweak.

Butters as his evil alter ego, Professor Chaos.

As a result, Butters vengefully adopted the alter ego of Professor Chaos. Intending to be a supervillain, Professor Chaos wears a green cape, and a helmet and gauntlets constructed out of cardboard and aluminum foil, a parody of Marvel Comics' Dr. Doom. Butters as Professor Chaos received much focus during the back-to-back episodes "Professor Chaos" and "Simpsons Already Did It", where he took on his younger friend Dougie as his sidekick General Disarray and ultimately failed at their several ill-prepared attempts to create "worldwide chaos". Professor Chaos has occasionally made a few appearances since, appearing to be a known supervillain to South Park's police force.

Despite being displaced from both his role as the "fourth friend" and from the eventual return of Kenny, Butters has continued to be a major character in recent seasons and is still a good friend to the group. Formerly a social outcast in earlier episodes, he has nevertheless been seen spending considerable amounts of time with the other children, and continues to be a frequent source of help to Cartman, while also being the main victim of Cartman's pranks and manipulation: for instance, in the Season 11 episode "Cartman Sucks", Cartman goes on numerous sleepovers with Butters so he can pull pranks on him in his sleep. Though the act is customarily performed by Stan or Kyle, Butters will occasionally reflect on the lessons he has attained during the course of an episode with a brief speech, and will sometimes muster up enough courage to act as the voice of reason when his parents or other adults in town engage in irrational behavior. However, in "Awesom-O", Butters finally gets his revenge on Cartman by showing a videotape of him doing a Britney Spears dance routine to a life-sized cutout of Justin Timberlake to the whole town, humiliating Cartman. He is a main character in the South Park: Post COVID: The Return of COVID special, living under the alias 'Victor Chaos'. He has fully taken on the Professor Chaos role and makes a living by convincing people to invest in NFTs. He was Kenny McCormick's right-hand man, making all of Kenny's money by convincing people to invest in NFTs. He was also locked in a psychiatric hospital for his ability to convince people to invest their life savings into NFTs.

== Character ==
=== Creation and design ===
On August 13, 1997, Butters first appeared as a background character named Puff Puff when South Park debuted on Comedy Central with the episode "Cartman Gets an Anal Probe". For the episode, the character was composed of construction paper cutouts and animated through the use of stop motion. Since then, like all other characters on the show, Butters has been animated with computer software, though he is portrayed to give the impression that the show still utilizes its original technique. In the tradition of the show's animation style, Butters is composed of simple geometrical shapes and colors. He is not offered the same free range of motion associated with hand-drawn characters; his character is mostly shown from only one angle, and his movements are animated in an intentionally jerky fashion. Butters has a large tuft of blond hair on top of his head, and is usually depicted wearing an aquamarine jacket with dark green pants and black shoes. While originally voicing Butters without any computer manipulation, Stone now speaks within his normal vocal range while adding a childlike inflection, a slight stutter, and a Southern accent. The recorded audio is then edited with Pro Tools, and the pitch is altered to make the voice sound more like that of a 10 year old. Prior to South Park: Bigger, Longer & Uncut, Butters spoke in a lower-pitched tone and lacked any accents or stuttering.

=== Development ===
The character is loosely based on South Park co-producer Eric Stough, whom Stone and Parker regard as a "goody-goody" because of his reluctance to offend. The inspiration behind the major development of Butters was, in the words of Parker and Stone, Stough's geeky behavior during their production of South Park: Bigger, Longer & Uncut (1999): singling out an instance in which Stough and fellow staff members left work early to view a screening of Star Wars: The Phantom Menace, which irritated the aforementioned creators.

Parker and Stone then decided to parody Stough's antics in the series by transferring it to the character of Butters and proceeding to write the episode "Two Guys Naked in a Hot Tub", which aired three weeks after Bigger, Longer & Uncut was released. The nickname "Butters" evolved from Parker and Stone calling Stough "little buddy" for about three years. Prior to making his first major appearance in the Season 3 episode "Two Guys Naked in a Hot Tub", crew members referred to the character as "Puff Puff" and "Swanson", the latter name as which he was identified in the Season 2 episode "Conjoined Fetus Lady", and would continue to be addressed by the two names in storyboards and scripts until it was finalized as "Butters" in the aforementioned "Two Guys Naked in a Hot Tub".

Butters gradually became one of Parker and Stone's favorite characters, and for the show's Season 5 finale they created the episode "Butters' Very Own Episode", which revolves entirely around Butters and his parents. The intention was to give the character a proper introduction to the South Park audience and prepare them for the larger role he would come to play in further seasons. Butters eventually took part in more and more scenes in which he is paired with Cartman, and Parker has declared that the scenes involving the two together are his favorite of the series. Butters had very little dialogue in the 1999 film South Park: Bigger, Longer, and Uncut, receiving only one line total, though he does utter some grunts and other sounds during some scenes. In a 2009 audio commentary for the Blu-ray edition of the film, Parker and Stone expressed shock at how little the character was used, and agreed that any South Park movie made today would demand he play a role in the plot.

=== Personality and traits ===
Though using profanity on occasion, Butters does not indulge in this language as often as the other children on the show, instead preferring to use minced oaths; "oh hamburgers" is one he uses frequently, as well as "gee whiz" mostly in earlier seasons. Butters speaks with a mild stutter and tends to fidget with his hands. The other characters perceive him as "nerdy", and he obliviously maintains a wholesome attitude and mild disposition despite the tragedy and abuse that he frequently encounters. He frequently sings songs containing the phrase "loo loo loo". His happy-go-lucky persona has been described as resembling that of a typical 1950s sitcom child character, and is usually presented in stark contrast to the harsh treatment he receives at the hands of his friends and strict parents, including his mother's deranged attempt to murder him after discovering his father's bisexuality, as well as when his grandmother happens to be in town and constantly bullies him during her stay. Stone describes him as embodying "permanent innocence". Butters, however, sees himself as a problem child because his parents tell him so and often expresses remorse at being "out-of-control". Exceptions to this include the episode "The Ungroundable", in which Butters makes his parents worry about their ability to ground him when he refuses to be punished. This rebellious behavior begins after he joins the vampire kids at his school, but ends when he helps the Goth kids burn down a Hot Topic store. In the Season 14 episode "Sexual Healing", Butters did not want to have to buy a Batman costume when hearing about David Carradine's autoerotic asphyxiation death after testing positive for sex addiction.
