= Kyle Broflovski =

Fictional South Park character

- South Park character
- First appearance: Jesus vs. Frosty (1992, short)
- Created by: Trey Parker; Matt Stone
- Based on: Matt Stone
- Designed by: Trey Parker; Matt Stone
- Voiced by: Matt Stone

In-universe information
- Aliases: The Human Kite; High Jew Elf King; Kyley-B
- Gender: Male
- Occupation: Student, School counselor (future)
- Family: Gerald Broflovski (father); Sheila Broflovski (mother); Ike Broflovski (adopted brother)
- Significant others: Rebecca Cotswolds (formerly); Nichole Daniels (formerly); Leslie Meyers (formerly); Heidi Turner (formerly)
- Relatives: Cleo Broflovski (Note: She has the same last name as Sheila as Jewish tradition of the husbands taking the women's last names and the wives keeping their original names.) (maternal grandmother); Murrey Broflovski (paternal uncle); Kyle Schwartz (maternal cousin)
- Religion: Judaism, briefly Blaintologist and Roman Catholic
- Nationality: American
- Residence: South Park, Colorado, United States

Kyle Broflovski (Note: Kyle's last name has also been spelled Broslovski, Broslofski, Brovlofski, Broflofski, and Brovlowski.) (/broʊflɑːvskiː/) is a fictional character in the adult animated sitcom South Park. He is voiced by and loosely based on series co-creator Matt Stone. Kyle is one of the series' four central characters, along with his friends Stan Marsh, Kenny McCormick, and Eric Cartman. He debuted on television when South Park first aired on August 13, 1997 with the episode "Cartman Gets an Anal Probe", after having first appeared in The Spirit of Christmas shorts created by Stone and long-time collaborator Trey Parker in 1992 (Jesus vs. Frosty) and 1995 (Jesus vs. Santa).

Kyle is an elementary school student who commonly has extraordinary experiences not typical of conventional small-town life in his fictional hometown of South Park, Colorado. Kyle is distinctive as one of the few Jewish children on the show, and because of this, he often feels like an outsider among the core group of characters. His portrayal in this role is often dealt with satirically, and has elicited both praise and criticism from Jewish viewers.

Like the other South Park characters, Kyle is animated by computer in a way to emulate the show's original method of cutout animation. While Parker and Stone portray Kyle as having common childlike tendencies, his dialogue is often intended to reflect stances and views on more adult-oriented issues, and has been cited in numerous publications by experts in the fields of politics, religion, popular culture, and philosophy.

== Role in South Park ==
Kyle attends South Park Elementary as part of Mr. Garrison's class. During the show's first 58 episodes, Kyle and the other students were in the third grade, but transferred to fourth grade in the 4th-season episode "4th Grade". He lives in South Park with his father Gerald, a lawyer, and his overprotective mother Sheila, a housewife who fits the mold of a Jewish mother stereotype. Gerald and Sheila have been referred to have Polish and Russian-Jewish background, and they mutually share a strong devotion to their Jewish religion, while expressing deep concern during the multiple times Kyle's faith in Judaism becomes enervated. Kyle has a younger brother named Ike, who Kyle learns was adopted and originally from Canada in the episode "Ike's Wee Wee".

Gerald often attempts to teach Kyle important morals. Although his mother's outspoken, manipulative nature usually overwhelms Kyle, he tends to show that he truly loves her, and takes offense to any insult Cartman may offer about her (typically concerning her weight, as demonstrated through the song "Kyle's Mom a Big Fat Bitch" from "Mr. Hankey, the Christmas Poo" and South Park: Bigger, Longer & Uncut). Although in the early seasons he engages in the reckless act of punting Ike like a football, Kyle shows concern for his brother's well-being. He was initially reluctant to embrace Ike as his brother upon learning that Ike was adopted, but Ike's genuine affection for his older brother persuaded Kyle to love him in return, and regard him as "true family".

Kyle is modeled after Stone, while Stan is modeled after Parker. Kyle and Stan are best friends, and their relationship, which is supposed to reflect the real-life friendship between Parker and Stone, is a common topic throughout the series. The two do have their disagreements, but always reconcile without any long-term damage to their friendship. The show's official website defines Kyle's role amongst his friends as "the smart one". He often provides a sober thought to plans or ideas made by the other boys, and explains a moral outlook while drawing upon his vast knowledge and intelligence. He tends to offer reasonable or scientific explanations both to situations most others view as supernatural in nature, and in opposition of propaganda dispensed by Cartman.

Several episodes focus on Kyle and his religion, and being the lone Jew has resulted in an enmity with the Antisemitic Cartman that has become significantly more pronounced as the series progresses. Parker and Stone have compared the relationship to the one shared by Archie Bunker and Michael Stivic on the 1970s sitcom All in the Family. Kyle makes cracks at Cartman's weight and is horrified and disgusted with Cartman's immorality, cruelty, bigotry, and greed. Their rivalry often elevates to the point where Kyle becomes so obsessed with beating Cartman at whatever he does, he sometimes neglects Stan and Kenny in the process. He has a tendency to make what he thinks are safe bets with Cartman, often losing these bets when the improbable actions promised by Cartman are accomplished. Though he has claimed Kenny was not his friend, in order to avoid having to spend the night at his poverty-stricken household, Kyle has professed a friendship with Kenny and shown genuine concern for Kenny's health and safety. Kyle normally has the angrier reaction of yelling "You bastards!" following Stan's exclamation of the popular catchphrase "Oh my God, they killed Kenny!" after one of Kenny's trademark deaths.

Near the end of the production run of the show's fifth season (2001), Parker and Stone contemplated having an episode in which Kyle was killed off. The reasoning behind the idea was to genuinely surprise fans, and to allow an opportunity to provide a major role for Butters Stotch, a breakout character whose popularity was growing with the viewers and creators of the show. Parker and Stone initially chose Kyle because they deemed him as being too similar to Stan in terms of personality. Instead, the character of Kenny was chosen, and he was seemingly killed off for good in the episode "Kenny Dies" (however he officially returns in the season 6 finale "Red Sleigh Down", and between the prior episodes "A Ladder to Heaven" and "The Biggest Douche in the Universe" had his soul possessing Cartman's body as a result of the latter mistaking his ashes for chocolate milk mix and accidentally drinking them). The duo claimed they grew tired of upholding the tradition of having Kenny die in each episode, and regarded the character as a "prop".

In many episodes, Kyle draws upon his sense of social purpose and moral outrage, and reflects on the lessons he has learned during the course of an episode, with a speech that often begins "You know, I learned something today...". Kyle acknowledged this trend in the season five (2001) episode "Cartmanland" when he states that he often gives the speech each week in an attempt to "try and better myself", and again in the season seven (2003) episode "Butt Out" where he repeatedly reminds his friends that they continuously allow potentially riotous events to occur, and are only able to defuse the situation by giving such a speech to the gathered townsfolk.

Kyle's mother reveals in the episode "Cherokee Hair Tampons" that Kyle is diabetic and had to get a kidney transplant. His diabetes could explain why he gets sick more often than his classmates.

Kyle has a democratic political stance, as seen in the episode "The Wacky Molestation Adventure", where he brings democracy to the previously communist Cuba.

== Character ==
=== Creation and design ===
Kyle's hair, which is usually hidden underneath his hat

An unnamed precursor to Kyle first appeared in the first The Spirit of Christmas short, dubbed Jesus vs. Frosty, created by Parker and Stone in 1992 while they were students at the University of Colorado. The character was composed of construction paper cutouts and animated using stop motion. When asked three years later by friend Brian Graden to create another short as a video Christmas card that he could send to friends, Parker and Stone created another similarly animated The Spirit of Christmas short, dubbed Jesus vs. Santa. In this short, which was the first appearance of Kyle styled as he is in the series, he is given his first name. When developing the character, Parker recalled there being only one Jewish student in his entire hometown of Conifer, Colorado, and described him as being "the token Jewish person". Kyle next appeared on August 13, 1997, when South Park debuted on Comedy Central with the episode "Cartman Gets an Anal Probe".

From the show's third episode, "Weight Gain 4000" (season one, 1997), Kyle, like all other characters on the show, has been animated using computer software, though he is presented to give the impression that the show still utilizes its original technique. In keeping with the show's animation style, Kyle is composed of simple geometrical shapes. He is not offered the same free range of motion associated with hand-drawn characters; his character is generally shown from only one angle, and his movements are animated in an intentionally jerky fashion.

Kyle is usually depicted wearing winter attire that consists of a bright green ushanka, a bright orange jacket, dark green jeans, and lime-green mittens/gloves. In the rare instances in which he is shown without his cap, he has a bright red-to-auburn Jewfro. His hat and hairstyle were influenced by those of James Humphrey, a character whom Matt Stone portrayed in the 1993 film Cannibal! The Musical. Matt also had a hat just like Kyle's as a kid. Stone cited that he came up with the voice of Kyle while he and Parker were in film class, where they would speak in high-pitched childish voices that would often get them into trouble. The recorded audio is edited with Pro Tools, and the pitch altered to make the voice sound more like that of a 10 year old.

=== Personality and traits ===
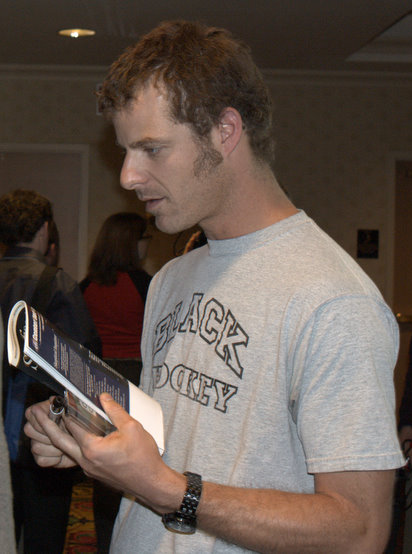
Kyle is modeled after his voice actor, series co-creator Matt Stone.

Like his friends, Kyle is foul-mouthed as a means for Parker and Stone to display how they claim young boys really talk when they are alone. Parker notes that while Kyle is sometimes cynical and profane, there is an "underlying sweetness" to the character, and Time described Kyle and his friends as "sometimes cruel but with a core of innocence". He is amused by bodily functions and toilet humor, and his favorite television personalities are Terrance and Phillip, a Canadian duo whose comedy routines on their show-within-the-show revolve substantially around fart jokes.

Kyle often displays the highest moral standard of all the boys and is usually depicted as the most intelligent. When describing Kyle, Stone states that both he and the character are "reactionary", and susceptible to irritability and impatience. In some instances, Kyle is the only child in his class to not initially indulge in a fad or fall victim to a ploy. This has resulted in both his eagerness to fit in, and his resentment and frustration.

As a Jew, Kyle often defends and shows pride in his religion and ancestry. He is nevertheless lonely in this regard, particularly around Christmas time, though he takes solace in anticipating the annual appearance of Mr. Hankey, an anthropomorphic piece of feces who emerges from the sewer to spread Christmas cheer.

A recurring plot element is the depiction of Kyle as insecure about Jewish traditions and beliefs. Already regarding God as cruel for allowing him to suffer from a life-threatening hemorrhoid while Cartman enjoys a million-dollar inheritance, Kyle became further appalled after being read the story of Job. He also once feared damnation for not having grown up as a Catholic. During both instances, he renounced his affiliation with Judaism, only to have his faith restored by events occurring at the end of an episode. After watching The Passion of the Christ, a shameful Kyle suddenly felt that Cartman's antisemitism was justified, and suggested to angry members of his synagogue that the Jews apologize for the death of Jesus. Kyle's guilt is quickly alleviated when he encounters Mel Gibson, the film's director, and perceives him to be nothing more than a deranged masochist.

Kyle has a first cousin also named Kyle, whom he resents for being the embodiment of Jewish stereotypes and causing Kyle to question whether or not he was a self-hating Jew. Kyle is hopelessly inept at choreographed dancing; in the eyes of Cartman, he perpetuated the stereotype that "Jews have no rhythm". His birthday is May 26, the same day as Stone. Kyle was conceived in New Jersey.

== In other media ==
Kyle had a major role in South Park: Bigger, Longer & Uncut, the full-length film based on the series, and appeared on the film's soundtrack singing the same musical numbers performed in the film. As a tribute to the Dead Parrot sketch, a short that features Kyle as the owner of a shop to where Cartman attempts to return a dead Kenny aired during a 1999 BBC television special commemorating the 30th anniversary of Monty Python's Flying Circus. Kyle also featured in the documentary film The Aristocrats, listening to Cartman tell his version of the film's titular joke, and in "The Gauntlet", a short spoofing both Gladiator and Battlefield Earth which aired during the 2000 MTV Movie Awards. Stone performs as Kyle on tracks for Chef Aid: The South Park Album and Mr. Hankey's Christmas Classics.

Kyle also appears in six South Park-related video games: In South Park, Kyle is controlled by the player through the first-person shooter mode who attempts to ward off enemies from terrorizing the town of South Park. In South Park: Chef's Luv Shack, a user has the option of playing as Kyle when participating in the game's several "mini-games" based on other popular arcade games. In the racing game South Park Rally, a user can race as Kyle against other players, selecting from a variety of vehicles. In South Park Let's Go Tower Defense Play!, Kyle can be selected as a playable character used to establish a tower defense against the game's antagonists. Kyle role-plays as the Elf King in the 2014 game, The Stick of Truth, as well as in its sequel, The Fractured but Whole, where he role-plays as the Human Kite.

== Cultural impact ==
Kyle's depiction on the show has drawn both praise and criticism from the Jewish community. Detractors of the character cite his own habit of eschewing common Jewish practices and reiterating negative stereotypes for comedic purposes. Supportive Jewish viewers commend the show for using Kyle to accurately portray what it is like for a young Jew to have to endure loneliness and bigotry as an ethnic and religious minority. One of the show's more popular episodes, "The Passion of the Jew" (season eight, 2004), deals largely with Kyle's religious anxiety. The episode was independently released on DVD along with two other religion-themed episodes from the series.

Over the seasons Kyle has addressed topics such as brotherhood, excessive litigation, hate crime legislation, civil liberties, profanity in television, hybrid vehicle ownership, and the economy. In the season 10 (2006) episode "Cartoon Wars Part II", Kyle expresses his opinions on censorship, and iterates Parker and Stone's sentiments on the topic by telling a television executive "Either it's all okay, or none of it is" in regard to whether any subject should remain off-limits to satire. To Parker and Stone's disappointment, the episode received more attention for its criticism of the show Family Guy than it did for Kyle's proclamation.

Kyle's opinions have been the subject of much critical analysis in the media and literary world. The book South Park and Philosophy: You Know, I Learned Something Today includes an essay in which Bridgewater State College philosophy professor William J. Devlin references the teachings of Socrates and Friedrich Nietzsche when describing Kyle's role in the show. Essays in the books South Park and Philosophy: Bigger, Longer, and More Penetrating, Blame Canada! South Park and Contemporary Culture, and Taking South Park Seriously have also analyzed Kyle's perspectives within the framework of popular philosophical, theological, and political concepts.
