= Pip (South Park) =

- South Park episode
- Pip encountering an escaped convict. The episode, which is a retelling of the Dickens novel Great Expectations, has a unique look within the series.
- Episode no.: Season 4 Episode 14
- Directed by: Eric Stough
- Written by: Trey Parker
- Production code: 405
- Original air date: November 29, 2000

Guest appearance
- Malcolm McDowell as "A British Person"

Episode chronology
← Previous "Helen Keller! The Musical"	Next → "Fat Camp"
- South Park season 4

"Pip" (also known as "Great Expectations") is the fourteenth episode in the fourth season of the American animated television series South Park. The 62nd episode of the series overall, it first aired on Comedy Central in the United States on November 29, 2000. Going by production order, it is the fifth episode of the fourth season instead of the fourteenth. The episode is a parody and comedic retelling of Charles Dickens's 1861 novel Great Expectations, and stars the South Park character Pip, who assumes the role of the protagonist of the novel, who is his eponym. "Pip" features no other regular characters from the show, and is one of two episodes of the entire series where neither Stan, Kyle, Cartman, nor Kenny make an appearance, the other being "A Million Little Fibers". The story is narrated in a live action parody of the anthology television series Masterpiece Theater, with the narrator played by Malcolm McDowell.

Pip as a character was established to originate from the Dickens novel early on in the series, and South Park creators Trey Parker and Matt Stone had the idea of retelling Great Expectations with the character for a long time. "Pip" has a unique design and animation compared to other episodes. To achieve this look, many assets had to be built from scratch. This was a demanding task for the South Park studios at the time, and production of the episode was stretched out across several months. The concept of the episode changed significantly during this time; for example, the original plan was for the episode to be a musical.

Parker and Stone have said that "Pip" is one of the least-popular episodes. The episode was written by Parker and directed by animation director Eric Stough. Since its original airing, it has been re-run infrequently on Comedy Central.

== Plot ==
The story is set in a 19th-century-like England, in a small town called Draftingshire-Upon-Topsmart. An orphaned Pip is visiting his parents' grave. While there, an escaped convict appears and threatens Pip. Pip aids the convict by giving him food. He then goes home, where his sister's husband, Joe, reads an advertisement about a Miss Havisham seeking a boy to play with her daughter. Pip goes and meets the daughter, Estella, who constantly insults him. Miss Havisham hires Pip, and throughout their playtimes, he eventually falls in love with Estella.

Pip fears Estella could never marry a commoner like him. However, an offer comes for Pip from an anonymous benefactor to move to London and learn how to become a gentleman. Pip assumes the benefactor is Miss Havisham and accepts. After his time in London, where had a roommate named Mr. Pocket, he shows up at Miss Havisham's house, where she tells Pip that he can find Estella at a party at the palace. At the ball, Pip and Estella dance together. Estella says that she has no heart and cannot love. Just before Pip asks Estella to be his girlfriend, her boyfriend, a modern American 17-year-old named Steve, enters the ball.

Pip, saddened, runs to tell Miss Havisham, only to find that she approves of Steve. Miss Havisham is glad that Estella has broken Pip's heart, and explains that she has Estella break men's hearts to use their tears to power her "Genesis Device". She desires youth and wants to use the device to switch bodies with Estella. She then uses robot monkeys to attack Pip. Pip escapes and falls unconscious, awakening back home with Joe and Pocket. The anonymous person who sent Pip to London is revealed to be the escaped convict Pip met earlier as a way of repaying Pip's kindness. Because of Pip's kindness, the convict led a life of goodness and became a millionaire. The four of them, Pip, Joe, Pocket, and the convict, decide to stop Miss Havisham.

The group returns to the mansion, discovering many brokenhearted men and boys and Miss Havisham powering up her device. Pip manages to convince Estella to leave the machine, destroying it and setting Miss Havisham on fire. Fleeing the burning mansion, Pip's group and the hostage males escape as Estella finally declares her love for Pip.

== Production and broadcast ==
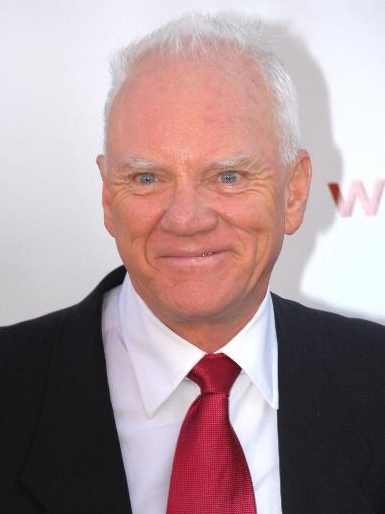
In the live action scenes, actor Malcolm McDowell played the narrator of the episode, simply calling himself "a British person"

Creators Matt Stone and Trey Parker had the idea to recreate Charles Dickens's Great Expectations in the style of South Park from the very beginning of the series. The character of Pip has been a minor character on South Park from the show's onset, having appeared in the pilot episode, "Cartman Gets an Anal Probe". Pip had a somewhat bigger role in the original, unaired version of the pilot, but most of his scenes have been cut from the reworked and shorter broadcast version. One of these cut scenes, a short sequence in the school cafeteria that introduces Pip, was reinserted into the show's fifth episode "An Elephant Makes Love to a Pig" (as the scene came from the pilot, it was created with traditional paper cutout stop motion animation). In the scene, Stan asks Pip about his peculiar name, but Cartman interrupts Pip during his answer. Pip's reply - "my father's family-name being Pirrip and my Christian name Phillip, my infant tongue-" - is identical to the opening line of the novel Great Expectations, which is narrated by its protagonist, Pip.

Production for the episode started after the first run of the series's fourth season, which consisted of four episodes. At the beginning of the second run, of six episodes (which started broadcasting in June 2000), the episode was assigned a production code number of 405 (meaning the 5th episode of the 4th season), and it was planned to air in June or July that year. However, given the complicated nature of the episode's look, where many elements had to be designed from scratch, the studio did not have enough time to finish the episode that summer, and it was moved to the next batch of episodes. As it was already in production before the run, "Pip" was a "banked" episode of South Park, one of the first in the series's history. Whereas most episodes of South Park are created within a week, from scratch, the creators sometimes try to have one episode "in the bank" - meaning that they have "at least half-start[ed]" animating it. This way they can take off a few days during the two-month-long, demanding run, and then go back and finish work on the banked show. After completing the previous episode, "Helen Keller! The Musical", which aired on November 22, 2000, the Wednesday before Thanksgiving (November 23), the creators went to spend time with their families for the holiday, and then came back on Sunday, November 26, to finish "Pip". The episode aired the next Wednesday, on November 29, 2000 on Comedy Central in the United States, as the 14th episode of the season, and the fourth episode of the winter run. Since its original airing, it has been re-run infrequently on Comedy Central.

The episode, directed by South Park animation director Eric Stough, has a unique look compared to most other episodes of the series. The creators wanted a different design for Pip's England featured in the episode. For example, the directions for the exterior scenes were to make them look like they were "right out of a Dickens novel". To achieve the style, assets had to be built from scratch, including many new characters with "new mouths with rotten-out teeth" that were used for most of them. At the beginning of the episode, Pip is dressed in more ragged clothing than he usually wears in South Park. Later, when he becomes a gentleman in London, he is wearing his usual South Park attire, including his bow tie. The character of Pocket is designed to look similar to the children in the 1974 Rankin/Bass animated Christmas television special 'Twas the Night Before Christmas.

The structure of the episode changed often during its production over the season. This storyboard from an earlier version of the episode shows Pip telling his story in front of the class.

From its inception to its broadcast, there were many changes in how the episode is presented. Originally, "Pip" was going to be a musical episode, the first South Park musical since the 1999 movie South Park: Bigger, Longer & Uncut. At one point, the plan was to have Pip tell his own story to the South Park Elementary class. An early storyboard scene shows "Pip walk[ing] up to the class holding a HUGE manuscript of paper. It could be a novel". Beginning his story in the classroom, he starts by introducing the origins of his name, only to be interrupted by Cartman - much like the scene in "An Elephant Makes Love to a Pig". In the end, the finished episode did not include the boys or any other regular characters. As Stone and Parker explained, "bookend[ing] it with the kids or hav[ing] the kids listening to the story" would be too formulaic for their tastes, so they decided to make the episode without the South Park boys, precisely "[b]ecause it's a bad idea". Having an episode's worth of story told in front of the class was later used in the season eighth episode "Woodland Critter Christmas", which has Cartman telling a Christmas-themed story (in a plot twist). The ending of the story's narration in that episode resembles the ending in "Pip". In "Pip", the narrator ends the story with the line "And they all lived happily ever after, except for Pocket, who died of Hepatitis B". In "Woodland Critter Christmas", Cartman finishes the story by saying "And they all lived happily ever after. Except for Kyle, who died of AIDS two weeks later". Another idea was to have Chef narrate the episode, in the style of Masterpiece Theater. In the end, the creators decided to do the Masterpiece parody in live-action, with the narrator played by Malcolm McDowell. The reason behind the introduction was to make it clear to the viewers that it was going to be an "extremely different experience" from the other episodes, and that they are not going to see the regular characters of the show. The creators said that they did this having learned the lesson from the second season episode "Terrance and Phillip in Not Without My Anus" - which also revolves entirely around two minor characters - about the necessity of making the audience aware that they are not to expect to see the regular characters any time during the episode. Both McDowell and the two creators have spoken highly of each other. Parker and Stone said that shooting with McDowell was a positive experience, and that he told old stories about the 1971 film A Clockwork Orange - which McDowell starred in - and its director Stanley Kubrick.

"Pip" features regular voice-acting from Parker and Stone for most characters (with Stone as the voice of Pip), as well as Eliza Schneider (credited both by her real name and her pseudonym "Blue Girl") providing the voice for Estella. Joe was voiced by South Park staff writer Kyle McCulloch, because, according to Stone, McCulloch "can do really good British voices, because he grew up in Canada watching a bunch of British TV".

== Cultural references and themes ==
"Pip" serves as an explanation of the origins of its central character, as well as a retelling of the 1861 Charles Dickens novel Great Expectations. The episode is not a straight adaptation of the novel, but a comedic retelling thereof. As such, the episode's main aim is not to represent Great Expectations, but to use it for the purpose of comedy. Some of Pip's speech, such as "breaky-wakey out of prison" and "that's a lot of money-woney" is a reference to Malcolm McDowell's character Alex's speech in the 1971 film A Clockwork Orange. Many of the central characters of the novel appear in the episode. These include Pip, as well as Joe (Pip's brother-in-law), Mrs Joe (Pip's sister), Miss Havisham, Estella Havisham, Herbert Pocket, and the escaped convict. For most of the episode, the plot stays relatively faithful to the novel's basic story. At one point however, the episode begins major digressions from the novel, mainly Miss Havisham's technology, such as her Genesis Device and robot monkeys. The ending of the episode has been viewed as "a joke about contemporary Hollywood's inability to produce entertainment that does not depend on idiotic spectacle."

The way the story is presented - South Park Classics - is a parody of Masterpiece Theater (now continued as Masterpiece Classic), a drama anthology television series airing on the Public Broadcasting Service (PBS) in the United States, best known for presenting adaptations of classic works of literature. (Incidentally, Masterpiece Theater featured an adaptation of Great Expectations in 1999.) Malcolm McDowell's portrayal of the narrator parodies Alistair Cooke, "a British person" himself, who was the host of Masterpiece Theater between 1971 and 1992. The setup has been viewed as "a joke about America's (or more specifically, the typical PBS viewer's) haughty search for cultural enrichment in the English classics", based on the context of "[t]he cultural authority of the British, so long courted by the American culture industries."

== Reception and home media ==
"Pip" is a relatively unpopular episode of the series. According to creators Matt Stone and Trey Parker, it is "probably one of the least-popular episodes of South Park" they have ever produced, and "most people [...] pretty much hated it". In 2004, Stone said that he considers the episode "really cool" and "really good". In a 2011 Entertainment Weekly feature, the two named what they consider the best 15 episodes of South Park, along with the 53 worst. "Pip" was number 49 on the "Worst" list (following the first 48 spots which collectively consisted of every episode from the first three seasons). Parker said that "Everyone, including we, hates 'Pip'", and Stone said "I don't hate it. But it was like, 'Why did you guys do that?'." The creators said that recreating Great Expectations in South-Park-style "seemed like a decent-enough idea, except that [the novel] kinda sucks, especially its ending". They have concluded that while they sometimes want to do an episode that is different in style and presentation to the other episodes, it is necessary to have the story involve the regular characters, otherwise audiences will not like it.

In his paper about the episode, Jeffrey Sconce wrote that the episode ultimately "proved a rather self-indulgent [...] effort", and that it had failed "in terms of viewer-response and ratings". In their review of the fourth season DVD, IGN called the episode "a serious fizzle", saying that the creators "don't always hit a home-run".
