= South Park season 4 =

Season of television series

South Park
- Season 4
- Home media release cover
- No. of episodes: 17

Release
- Original network: Comedy Central
- Original release: April 5 – December 20, 2000

Season chronology
- ← Previous; Season 3 Next → Season 5

The fourth season of South Park, an American animated television series created by Trey Parker and Matt Stone, began airing on April 5, 2000. The fourth season concluded after airing 17 episodes on December 20, 2000.

The first four episodes in this season have the year 2000 at the end of their episode titles. As explained in the FAQ section on the official website: "When the year 2000 was coming up, everyone and their brother had '2000' in the titles of their products and TV shows. America was obsessed with 2000, so Trey Parker put '2000' in the titles to make fun of the ubiquity of the phrase."

This is the first season not to feature Mary Kay Bergman as a series regular, who provided many of the female voices on the show (Bergman died by suicide on November 11, 1999). Eliza Schneider and Mona Marshall replaced Mary Kay Bergman in season four after her death. It also marks the only whole season without her to be animated with their old software PowerAnimator before switching to Maya.

== Voice cast ==
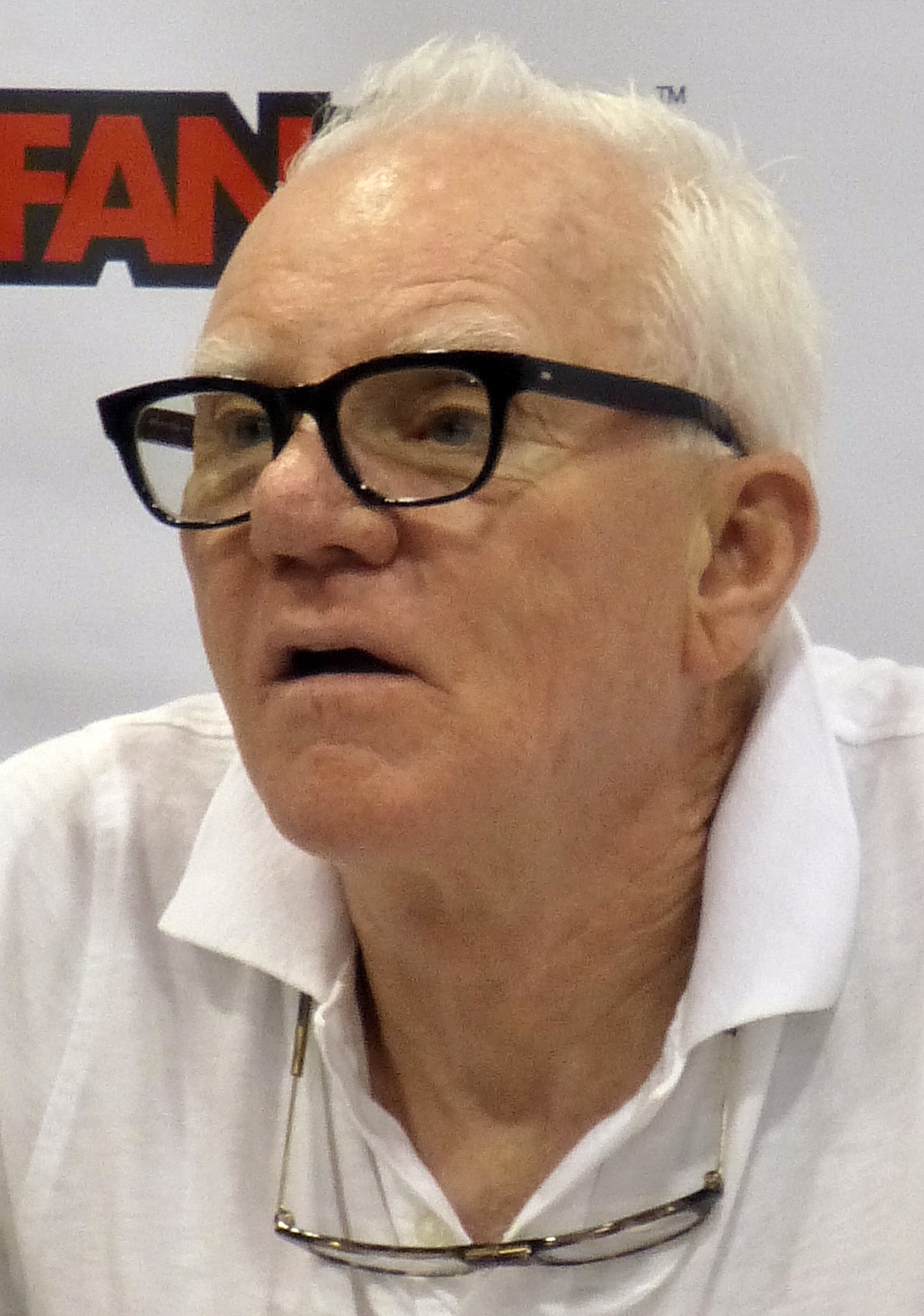
Malcolm McDowell (pictured in 2015), made a guest appearance as the narrator in "Pip"

This is the first season to feature Eliza Schneider and Mona Marshall as series regulars, who would go on to provide many of the female voices on the show. They replaced Mary Kay Bergman, who died on November 11, 1999.

=== Main cast ===
- Trey Parker as Stan Marsh, Eric Cartman, Randy Marsh, Mr. Garrison, Clyde Donovan, Mr. Hankey, Mr. Mackey, Stephen Stotch, Timmy Burch and Phillip
- Matt Stone as Kyle Broflovski, Kenny McCormick, Butters Stotch, Gerald Broflovski, Stuart McCormick, Pip Pirrup, Craig Tucker, Jimbo Kern, Terrance and Jesus
- Eliza Schneider as Liane Cartman, Shelly Marsh, Sharon Marsh, Mayor McDaniels, Carol McCormick, Wendy Testaburger, Principal Victoria and Ms. Crabtree
- Mona Marshall as Sheila Broflovski and Linda Stotch
- Isaac Hayes as Chef

=== Guest cast ===
- Richard Belzer as Loogie ("The Tooth Fairy's Tats 2000")
- Cheech Marin as Carlos Ramirez ("Cherokee Hair Tampons")
- Tommy Chong as Chief Running Pinto ("Cherokee Hair Tampons")
- Dian Bachar as Chris ("Do the Handicapped Go to Hell?" and "Probably")
- Malcolm McDowell as narrator ("Pip")
- Louis Price as Cornwallis's singing voice ("A Very Crappy Christmas")

== Episodes ==
No. overall	No. in season	Title	Directed by	Written by	Original release date	Prod. code	U.S. viewers (millions)
49	1	"The Tooth Fairy's Tats 2000" "The Tooth Fairy's Tats"	Trey Parker	Trey Parker, Matt Stone & Nancy M. Pimental	April 5, 2000	402	2.38
The boys plan to get rich off a scheme involving the tooth fairy, which attracts the attention of an unusual crime boss. Meanwhile, Kyle ponders his existence after his parents tell him the truth about the tooth fairy.
50	2	"Cartman's Silly Hate Crime 2000" "Cartman's Silly Hate Crime"	Trey Parker & Eric Stough	Trey Parker	April 12, 2000	401	2.62
After hitting Token in the head with a rock, Cartman gets arrested after FBI agents claim that he committed a hate crime.
51	3	"Timmy 2000" "Timmy"	Trey Parker	Trey Parker	April 19, 2000	404	2.88 1.83 (HH) (Note: (HH) denotes that the numbers listed are the number of households the episode was viewed in.)
All the kids in South Park are mistakenly diagnosed with attention deficit disorder after the new, mentally disabled student Timmy is misdiagnosed himself. Meanwhile, Timmy joins Skyler's rock band, and Phil Collins plots to separate them.
52	4	"Quintuplets 2000" "Contorting Quintuplets 2000" "Quintuplets"	Trey Parker	Trey Parker	April 26, 2000	403	2.74 1.81 (HH)
Stan's family take in a grandmother and her quintuplet granddaughters from Romania who are on the run from the American and Romanian government. Meanwhile, Kenny practices opera singing and he eventually becomes famous in Eastern Europe.
53	5	"Cartman Joins NAMBLA"	Eric Stough	Trey Parker	June 21, 2000	406	2.75 1.82 (HH)
Cartman's search for mature friends lands him as the poster child for NAMBLA. Meanwhile, Kenny tries to prevent his parents from planning to have a child.
54	6	"Cherokee Hair Tampons"	Trey Parker	Trey Parker	June 28, 2000	407	2.84 1.72 (HH)
Stan must get Cartman to donate one of his kidneys to save Kyle's life when everyone in town is addicted to new-age medicine run by an old woman and her "Native American" co-workers. Meanwhile, Mr. Garrison becomes a romance novelist after getting fired from teaching for his incompetence and his actions in the previous episode. Guest Stars: Cheech Marin as "Chief Running Pinto" and Tommy Chong as "Carlos Ramirez"
55	7	"Chef Goes Nanners"	Trey Parker & Eric Stough	Trey Parker	July 5, 2000	408	2.45
Chef protests against the racist imagery on the South Park flag. Meanwhile, Wendy freaks out when she begins to have a crush on Cartman.
56	8	"Something You Can Do with Your Finger"	Trey Parker	Trey Parker	July 12, 2000	409	2.92 1.81 (HH)
Cartman ropes Stan, Kyle, and Kenny into creating a boy band, Fingerbang, in the quest to get $10 million. Wendy joins in the band and poses as a boy. Meanwhile, Stan's father, Randy, tries to prevent Stan from joining, as his previous ventures in a boy band didn't end well.
57	9	"Do the Handicapped Go to Hell?"	Trey Parker	Trey Parker	July 19, 2000	410	2.24
The boys question whether the handicapped (Timmy) or Jews (Ike and Kyle) go to heaven, while Saddam Hussein returns to Hell, leading to an awkward reunion with Satan.
58	10	"Probably"	Trey Parker	Trey Parker	July 26, 2000	411	3.03 2.01 (HH)
Cartman and the boys start their own church against the wishes of their parents. Meanwhile, Satan must choose between his two lovers.
59	11	"Fourth Grade"	Trey Parker	Trey Parker	November 8, 2000	412	3.60
The boys enter fourth grade, and build a time machine to go back to the third grade. Meanwhile, the fourth grade teacher Ms. Choksondik seeks help in controlling the students from Mr. Garrison, who is now a hermit who won't come to terms with his homosexuality.
60	12	"Trapper Keeper"	Trey Parker	Trey Parker	November 15, 2000	413	3.27
A man from the future wants Cartman's new Trapper Keeper. Meanwhile, Mr. Garrison's kindergarten class holds an election for class president with confusing results in the voting.
61	13	"Helen Keller! The Musical"	Trey Parker	Trey Parker	November 22, 2000	414	3.51 (Note: This episode also received 1.6 million viewers with persons aged 18-34.)
Timmy finds and befriends a live turkey for the Thanksgiving play named Gobbles, but his chances of being in the play are slim when a fancier turkey is brought in. Meanwhile, Butters keeps telling the other fourth graders about the technical superiority of the kindergartners' play, so they're forced to keep upping the stakes.
62	14	"Pip" "Great Expectations"	Eric Stough	Trey Parker	November 29, 2000	405	2.39
A retelling of Charles Dickens' "Great Expectations" starring Pip, with Malcolm McDowell (playing "a British person") narrating.
63	15	"Fat Camp"	Trey Parker	Trey Parker	December 6, 2000	415	3.61 (Note: This episode also received 1.93 million viewers with persons aged 25 to 54.) 2.31 (HH)
Cartman is sent to a weight loss camp. Meanwhile, Kenny becomes famous for doing disgusting and shocking things for money.
64	16	"The Wacky Molestation Adventure"	Trey Parker	Trey Parker	December 13, 2000	416	2.87
The boys, angry at their parents, send them to jail claiming they were "molestered", leaving the town to all of the children.
65	17	"A Very Crappy Christmas"	Adrien Beard	Trey Parker	December 20, 2000	417	3.75 2.30 (HH)
Kyle is upset when Mr. Hankey is too busy with his family to spread holiday cheer, so he and the other boys create a Christmas cartoon based on Parker and Stone's "The Spirit of Christmas."

== See also ==
- South Park (Park County, Colorado)
- South Park City
