= A Very Crappy Christmas =

- South Park episode
- Episode no.: Season 4 Episode 17
- Directed by: Adrien Beard
- Written by: Trey Parker
- Production code: 417
- Original air date: December 20, 2000

Guest appearance
- Louis Price as Cornwallis's singing voice

Episode chronology
← Previous "The Wacky Molestation Adventure"	Next → "It Hits the Fan"
- South Park season 4

"A Very Crappy Christmas" is the 17th and final episode of the fourth season of the animated television series South Park, and the 65th episode overall. It first aired on Comedy Central in the United States on December 20, 2000. In the episode, Kyle awaits Mr. Hankey on Christmas, but he does not show up. In an effort to spread Christmas cheer, Kyle and the boys create their own animated special.

The episode was written by series co-creator Trey Parker and is rated TV-MA in the United States and is rated 12 in the United Kingdom. "A Very Crappy Christmas" is the fourth Christmas episode of the series.

== Plot ==
After Mr. Hankey fails to show up on Hanukkah, Kyle leads Stan, Cartman and Kenny into the sewers to investigate. When they find him, Kyle questions him, stating that nobody seems to have the Christmas spirit anymore. Mr. Hankey reveals that he has not surfaced due to issues with his family: his dissatisfied alcoholic wife Autumn, and their children (which he calls "nuggets") Cornwallis, Amber and Simon. Cornwallis wears glasses, scarf, and hat; Amber wears a hair bow and a dress; and Simon has a peanut sticking out from the top of his head (which renders him as being not too smart).

The boys, along with Mr. Hankey's kids, attempt to revive the Christmas spirit by singing carols on the sidewalk, but are totally ignored. While they lament not getting any presents, Cornwallis begins to wonder about his significance in the world as a piece of poo.

While watching a Peanuts Christmas special, where Snoopy is seen beating a naked Charlie Brown with a board, the boys get the idea to create a short animation to show the townspeople at the local drive-in which they would call The Spirit of Christmas. With backing from Mayor McDaniels, worried about South Park's economic state, the boys set about using cut-out animation to create their cartoon.

Meanwhile, Cornwallis, who has sunk further into depression, reveals his feelings to his father, who comforts him by singing "The Circle of Poo". This shows how poo is the lifeblood of the whole planet, and the song even finishes with Mr. Hankey holding up Cornwallis atop a cliff. Rejuvenated, Cornwallis and the others begin preparing the dilapidated drive-in for the screening.

After Cartman accidentally destroys a frame of the cartoon and quits the project, and Kenny is run over by a car, Stan and Kyle proceed with the project themselves, with Stan dubbing Cartman's voice over (taking extra opportunities to poke fun at his weight in the meantime), Kenny being killed off in the cartoon as well, and sending their cut outs to get made in South Korea. Finally, the film is ready and the whole town gathers to see it, including Cartman, who joins in getting credit for the movie, and claims he never quit in the first place. Only a few seconds in, though, the film breaks up.

As everyone sits at home, forcing the children of South Park to celebrate a Christmas with no presents, Cornwallis and Mr. Hankey fix the projector and the film restarts playing. (The film is made using excerpts of the second The Spirit of Christmas short film from 1995 called "Jesus vs. Santa".) Upon seeing the film, the townsfolk finally come to realize that the true spirit of Christmas is commercialism, and rush to the shops for last minute presents. Finally content, the boys head off to open their presents, turning down an offer to make a TV series out of their film.

== Production ==
According to the DVD commentary, the idea of the episode was to make the boys do The Spirit of Christmas and show how hard it was for Stone and Parker to make the original sketch. Very select scenes from The Spirit of Christmas are shown with a musical score over them, because none of the music was cleared. They decided to have Stan do Cartman's voice in the sketch because Parker had extensively changed how he voices Cartman since The Spirit of Christmas. The song Kyle sings in the episode is from the animated short 'Twas the Night Before Christmas. In fact at one point during the song his face changes to that of Joshua Trundle, one of the main characters from the special.

For "The Circle of Poo", based on the song "Circle of Life" from The Lion King, Cornwallis's singing voice is provided by former Temptation Louis Price (whose name is misspelled "Lewis" in the credits). Amber is voiced by Pam Brady, a member of the writing staff.

== Home media ==
"A Very Crappy Christmas", along with the sixteen other episodes from South Park's fourth season, were released on a three-disc DVD set in the United States on June 29, 2004. The sets included brief audio commentaries by Parker and Stone for each episode. On November 13, 2007, the episode was released on the compilation DVD Christmas Time In South Park.
