= Do the Handicapped Go to Hell? =

- South Park episode
- (From left to right), Saddam, Satan, and Chris at the dinner table.
- Episode no.: Season 4 Episode 9
- Directed by: Trey Parker
- Written by: Trey Parker
- Production code: 410
- Original air date: July 19, 2000

Guest appearance
- Dian Bachar as Chris

Episode chronology
← Previous "Something You Can Do with Your Finger"	Next → "Probably"
- South Park season 4

"Do the Handicapped Go to Hell?" is the ninth episode of the fourth season of the animated television series South Park, and 57th episode of the series overall. Going by the production air order, it would be 10th episode of Season 4. "Do the Handicapped Go to Hell?" originally aired in the United States on July 19, 2000, on Comedy Central. It is the first part of a two-parter, which concludes in the following episode "Probably". The story links some of the events and characters of the film South Park: Bigger, Longer & Uncut into the animated series. The episode is rated TV-MA in the United States.

In the episode, the boys become obsessed with religion after a sermon about Hell scares them. Meanwhile, Saddam Hussein returns to Hell and tries to dispose of Satan's new boyfriend. It is the last episode to feature the original "school bus" opening sequence featuring a singing caricature of Les Claypool; a new one would be introduced two episodes later in "Fourth Grade".

== Plot ==
Frightened into piety by Father Maxi's fire-and-brimstone sermon, Stan, Cartman, and Kenny begin to attend Sunday school classes with a nun named Sister Anne, who teaches them about Communion and confession. Issues arise when the children begin to ask questions regarding their classmates Kyle, who is Jewish, and Timmy, who is disabled and can say little more than his own name. The priest explains that both will go to Hell if they do not confess their sins. Later, in the confessional, Father Maxi tries to choke Cartman after he unwittingly confesses all the pranks he has played on the priest. Cartman tells the other kids that he has felt God's angry hand, which scares them even more.

Meanwhile, Hell, contrary to Maxi's preaching, is shown to be relatively pleasant; Satan and the people of Hell sing The Hukilau Song (featuring Frank Sinatra, Dean Martin, Tiny Tim, Mao Zedong, Princess Diana, Adolf Hitler, among many others). Afterwards, Satan is shown moving into a new luxury condo on the River Styx. Satan is torn between two lovers: Chris, an overly-sensitive man he is living with (voiced by Dian Bachar), and Saddam Hussein, Satan's emotionally-abusive ex whom he had killed at the end of South Park: Bigger, Longer & Uncut. Satan is surprised to see Saddam, though Saddam points out the obvious logic: "Yeah, you killed me. Where was I gonna go, Detroit?" It's apparent that Satan is still attracted to Saddam, and he struggles to choose between him and Chris. Chris invites Saddam over for dinner.

Back in South Park, the boys, frightened of dying without having confessed all their sins, are rushing to church when Kenny is hit by a bus. When they arrive at the church, they discover Father Maxi having sex with a woman in the confessional, sacrilegiously violating his priestly vows in doing so. A brunette woman with glasses runs away and shortly after Father Maxi is on his knees begging forgiveness then yells "Mrs. Donovan is a temptress from hell!" The boys, shocked and outraged at the priest's blatant sinfulness and hypocrisy, decide that they will have to save everyone themselves. The episode ends with Cartman using a bullhorn and a stereotypical, exaggerated Southern Protestant preacher's accent on a street corner, directing a large group of children to the creation of a new religious movement. The episode notes it is "to be continued", setting up one of the series' first two-parters.

== Reception ==
IGN rated the episode 9/10, stating "It's also one of the better religious satires the show has done." They comment that the funniest element is the love triangle between Satan, Saddam Hussein and Chris, and conclude that the episode is an example of "some of the most scathing commentary on social institutions there is."
