= Cherokee Hair Tampons =

- South Park episode
- Episode no.: Season 4 Episode 6
- Directed by: Trey Parker
- Written by: Trey Parker
- Production code: 407
- Original air date: June 28, 2000

Guest appearances
- Cheech Marin as Carlos Ramirez; Tommy Chong as Chief Running Pinto

Episode chronology
← Previous "Cartman Joins NAMBLA"	Next → "Chef Goes Nanners"
- South Park season 4

"Cherokee Hair Tampons" is the sixth episode of the fourth season of the animated television series South Park, and the 54th episode of the series overall. This is the season's seventh episode in production order. "Cherokee Hair Tampons" originally aired in the United States on June 28, 2000, on Comedy Central.

In the episode, Kyle needs a kidney transplant, and Cartman is discovered to be a perfect donor. Cartman gladly offers his kidney to Kyle, for the price of $10 million. Stan, worried about the inevitable loss of his best friend, decides to take matters into his own hands and get Cartman's kidney to save Kyle's life.

== Plot ==
The episode begins with a substitute teacher coming in to teach the 3rd grade class. The boys mess around with the teacher at roll call, with Stan pretending that he is Cartman, Kenny pretending he is Stan, and Cartman pretending he is Kenny. Cartman laughs so hard that milk squirts out of his nose, despite the fact that he was not drinking any. The teacher gives them all an assignment to make a get-well-soon card for Kyle, and Butters literally ends up being the card. Stan visits his sick friend, who is, according to his mother, suffering from kidney failure due to diabetes and needs a transplant. Since they are unable to find a donor and Sheila is worried about the risks of having Kyle undergo surgery, Sharon suggests to Sheila that she try New Age healing to cure Kyle. They visit the holistic medicine store of a newly arrived shopkeeper named Miss Information, who tells them that mysterious "toxins" are the cause of Kyle's ailments and prescribes a series of herbs to help him; they do not help, but she convinces the people of South Park that they are healing him even though it is not visible. The whole town becomes enamored with her remedies and buys such nostrums as "Cherokee hair tampons" from two supposed Native Americans (played by Cheech Marin and Tommy Chong) who share her store. Who for the record, are both Native Mexicans, but South Park's local population assume that the border between Mexico and the United States has always existed. Before long, everyone is so hooked on "holistic medicine" that Miss Information can get away with selling coat hangers as "dream catchers" for very high prices.

Meanwhile, Mr. Garrison is suspended for his incompetence as a third-grade teacher and for being arrested for attempted child molestation in the previous episode. He decides to fulfill his dream of publishing a book and begins to write a romance novel, in which he manages to use the word "penis" 6,083 times.

Stan goes to ask Dr. Doctor for help, and the doctor says that Kyle will die unless he gets a kidney transplant from the only other person in town with a compatible blood type: Cartman. Stan tries to convince everyone that the New Age so-called "healing" is not working and that only a kidney transplant can cure Kyle, but Miss Information insists that the doctor is only interested in making money from the procedure, even as she herself charges exorbitant prices for her holistic healing items. Stan tries to convince Cartman to donate his organ, and Cartman refuses to do it unless he gets $10 million in exchange. Upset at Cartman's callousness (even though he technically has a right), Stan tries to get his other friends to help him take Cartman's kidney by force. However, only Kenny, Butters, and Timmy show up, to Stan's disappointment. An attempt to sneak into Cartman's house and cut his kidney out while he sleeps proves fruitless, as he wears a "Kidney Blocker 2000". Resigned, Stan laments to Kenny over Kyle's imminent death at the hands of holistic medicine, but Kenny, furious at Stan for disregarding his numerous deaths in almost every episode up until then, storms off, only to be crushed by a falling piano. Stan does not notice this as he was busy crying. Mrs. Broflovski brings a very weak and gravely ill Kyle in for a "spiritual healing" by Miss Information's "Native Americans." Upon seeing Kyle, the "Native Americans" are horrified, and tell her that he needs a doctor. When she and the townsfolk try to press them for a solution, they decide to come clean and one of them admits that he’s more of a Mexicans, much to everyone’s horror. The two then reveal to the townsfolk that Miss Information is a fraud who convinced everyone that they were Native Americans and that they had simply neglected to set the record straight. Furious of being scammed, the townsfolk attack and beat Miss Information to death, and Stan declares that he has a plan to get Kyle a kidney.

Cartman awakens the next day to find the Kidney Blocker 2000 destroyed and blood all over his bed. Infuriated, he marches to Stan's house and recovers his kidney, then goes to the doctor and arranges to have it put back in, but not before signing a release form. However, it was all a ruse—part of Stan's plan. Cartman's mom had opened the Blocker and spread ketchup on his bed to fool him. The form he signed was fraud in the factum and actually allowed Kyle to take his kidney; the kidney that Stan had given him was fake. Cartman is angered, Kyle is better, and Mr. Garrison - now a best-selling author - comes to give him a signed copy of his book, In the Valley of Penises. Cartman is still enraged as Kyle and Stan laugh at him until milk comes out of Kyle's nose, and Cartman expresses relief that Kyle got his "crappy kidney."

== Production ==
The Cherokee woman in the live-action commercial was played by South Park audio editor Lydia Quidilla. In an interview, Quidilla stated that she received her first piece of hate mail for the episode. Richard "Cheech" Marin and Tommy Chong, from the comedy duo Cheech & Chong, played the two fake Native Americans. The episode served as a partial reunion of the two, although their voices were recorded separately: Chong recorded his lines at the South Park Studios, whereas Marin recorded his in San Francisco.

The live action segment was rated one of the "Best Live-Action South Park Commercials" by HuffPost.
