= Probably (South Park) =

- South Park episode
- Episode no.: Season 4 Episode 10
- Directed by: Trey Parker
- Written by: Trey Parker
- Production code: 411
- Original air date: July 26, 2000

Episode chronology
← Previous "Do the Handicapped Go to Hell?"	Next → "4th Grade"
- South Park season 4

"Probably" is the tenth episode of the fourth season of the animated television series South Park, and the 58th episode of the series overall. It is also the 10th episode of Season 4 in production order respectively. "Probably" originally aired in the United States on July 26, 2000, on Comedy Central. The episode was rated TV-MA. It is the second part of a two-parter, which concludes the story-line from the previous episode, "Do the Handicapped Go to Hell?"

In the episode, Cartman becomes an evangelical preacher when the boys break off from their church. Meanwhile, the feud between Saddam and Chris continues.

== Plot ==
The South Park children build a church-shaped shack to live in sinlessness, skip school, avoid home as much as possible, and listen earnestly to Cartman, who acts like a televangelist Protestant preacher. Kenny calls from Ensenada, Baja California, Mexico, where the bus that hit him in the previous episode dragged him. However, the boys believe that he is in Hell and that he is calling from "beyond the grave". Cartman uses Kenny's description of Mexico as his profile of Hell for his next sermon.

In the real Hell, Satan's love triangle situation with his former lover, Saddam, and his present one, Chris, has taken a turn for the worse. Chris and Saddam repeatedly murder each other, only to resurrect since they are already in Hell and have nowhere else to go - in other words, as Satan and other characters repeatedly remark, "where [were they] gonna go, Detroit?". Satan wonders if he should be with Saddam, whom he finds sexually attractive despite his abusive nature, or Chris, who is kinder and gentler, but isn't as sexually attractive to him. JonBenét Ramsey suggests that he ask God for help.

The Hell director welcomes a group of new arrivals to Hell. Many of them are observant people practicing different religious faiths who express surprise at being there, but they are told that they picked the wrong religion, and that the Mormons were the right answer regardless of their actions of when they were alive, much to the collective frustration and annoyance of the newly-damned.

Satan goes to visit God for the first time in over 5000 years for advice. God berates Satan for being so emotionally dependent on romantic relationships and not at all as he was when God first cast him out of Heaven. God suggests that Satan dump both lovers, spend time alone, and learn to appreciate himself, stating that this is how good relationships develop. Satan agrees and thanks God for his counsel before returning to Hell.

Meanwhile, Cartman has turned the children's church into an Evangelical-type cult and attempts to perform miracles during his services by slapping demons and curses out of his patients. Soon, Stan and Kyle discover Cartman swimming in cash in the church rectory. Cartman confesses easily that the whole situation has merely been his latest scheme to make ten million dollars by conning the other kids. Stan and Kyle are disillusioned by this, but they can't do anything about it as long as other children keep giving their money to Cartman. Sister Anne, however, asks Jesus to visit. Jesus tells the kids that God does not want them to fear obsessively over Hell, or to spend every waking minute worshiping all day, but to help others and live good, happy lives. The children, touched by this, agree with Jesus and decide to leave and return to their normal lives. Jesus punishes Cartman for blasphemously defrauding his friends by sending him to somewhere "worse" than Hell—Ensenada, Baja California—to think about his sins. Upon arriving there, he is greeted by Kenny.

Satan tells Saddam and Chris that he does not want to be with either of them and asks them to leave him alone. Chris agrees and leaves Satan, but Saddam refuses to go and continues harassing him. Satan blasts a hole in Saddam's abdomen, and when Saddam taunts Satan that he will eventually regenerate and reappear whole as is commonplace with people injured in Hell, Satan informs him that this will not occur, as he asked a favor of a "friend". With that, Saddam finds himself suddenly transported to Heaven, where to his horror, he is greeted by Mormons.

== Production ==
The episode begins with a flashback of the previous episode's plot, but also includes a depiction of the character Fonzie from the TV sitcom Happy Days figuratively and literally jumping the shark from that show's 1977 episode "Hollywood, Part 3," albeit here being eaten by the shark. This is the first instance of Cartman developing a Southern accent. During production, Parker and Stone edited gay pornography into the show as a joke that had to be edited out in post-production.
