= Chef Goes Nanners =

- South Park episode
- Episode no.: Season 4 Episode 7
- Directed by: Eric Stough; Trey Parker
- Written by: Trey Parker
- Production code: 408
- Original air date: July 5, 2000

Episode chronology
| ← Previous "Cherokee Hair Tampons" | Next → "Something You Can Do with Your Finger" |
- South Park season 4

"Chef Goes Nanners" is the seventh episode of the fourth season of the animated television series South Park, and the 55th episode of the series overall. It is eighth in production order. "Chef Goes Nanners" originally aired in the United States on Comedy Central on July 5, 2000.

In the episode, Chef's passionate protest declaring the South Park flag racist inflames the entire town. The kids separate into two opposing camps and prepare to debate the issue. Stan and Kyle champion the current flag while Wendy and Cartman head up the side for a new flag. Meanwhile, Wendy finds herself strangely attracted to Cartman.

== Plot ==
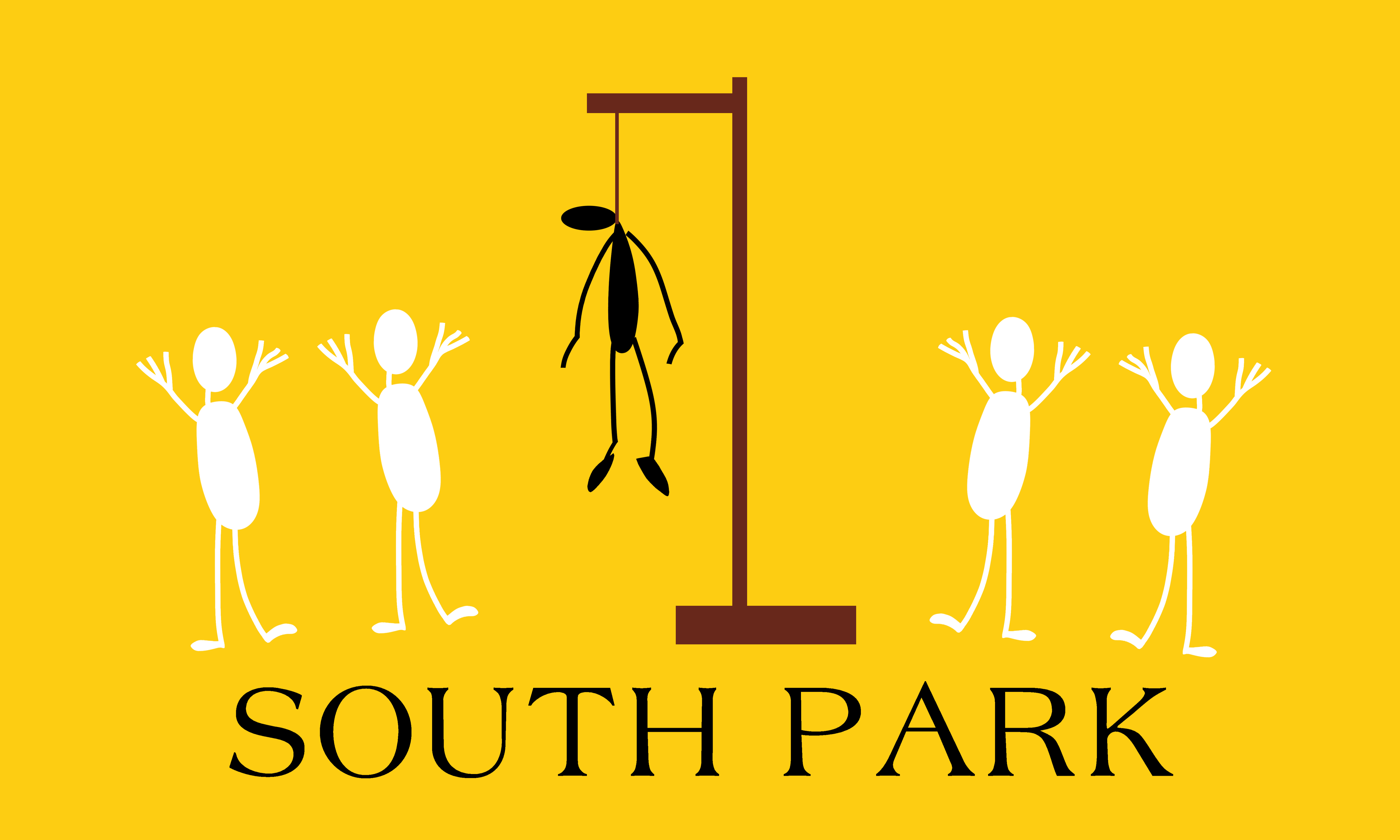
The flag of South Park, as seen in the episode

Jimbo and Chef visit Mayor McDaniels' office, arguing about the South Park town flag: Jimbo wants to keep it, for it has been around since the time of the town's founding; Chef, however, insists it is racist. The South Park flag depicts four white figures hanging a black one on a gallows, inciting Chef's indignation and leads him to believe that the whole town is racist. Chef immediately starts to rally support in order to change the flag. Neither he nor Jimbo can gather a lot of support, as very few townspeople have strong opinions either way on the issue. In school, the class is assigned to debate the "Change the Flag" issue. Stan and Kyle lead the team that wants to keep the flag the same, while Wendy and Cartman lead the side that wants to change it (with Cartman only volunteering presumably to irritate Wendy). During lunch, Stan and Kyle ask Chef for help. They find that the public apathy towards the flag debate has radicalized Chef; he has converted to Islam, and discarded his "slave name" of Chef in favor of "Abdul Mohammad Jabar Rauf Kareem Ali". Upon hearing that they think that the flag should not be changed, Chef gets agitated and verbally abusive towards the boys, who have no idea why Chef is so upset about the flag.

Wendy leads her team in the library when Cartman suddenly interrupts the process with his own strategy. He gets the team to dig up some dirt on Stan and Kyle, hoping to win the debate with ad hominem attacks on their credibility. Meanwhile, Kyle and Stan are at Kyle's father's law office studying how freedom of speech is an issue with the flag. While this is going on, Kenny eats 60 antacid tablets, believing they were mints, and then takes a drink of water, causing himself to explode. At the City Hall, members of the Ku Klux Klan march up, loudly voicing their support for the current flag as a symbol of "white power". This causes discomfort amongst Jimbo, Ned, and a number of the other flag supporters; their argument is genuinely concerned with historical reasons and do not wish to be sided on any issue with the Klan. To remedy this problem, Jimbo and Ned infiltrate the Klan and suggest that if they want the flag to remain unchanged, they should advocate that the flag should be changed, because the majority of people will always vote against whatever the Klan wants because of how discredited the movement is today. The leader embraces the idea, and the Klan switches sides. After Ned and Jimbo sneak out, they run into Chef while still wearing their Klan robes. Chef, mistakenly believing they are KKK members, drives off in anger before they can even explain, but not before splattering them both with mud from his car.

The mayor fails to appease Chef by revising the flag so that the black stick figure being hanged appears to be smiling and decides not to make the decision herself. She lets the kids' debate club decide the fate of the flag. This puts a lot of pressure on Wendy, who, in their study sessions, suddenly begins to feel attracted to Cartman. This scares Wendy, because Stan's her boyfriend and she and Cartman actually hate each other. Bebe later explains the concept of sexual tension to her, advising that she should kiss Cartman just to get it out of her system. During the debate, Wendy is distracted because she is attracted to Cartman and cannot deliver her opening remarks. She walks over and kisses him in front of the whole town, breaking the built-up tension and leaving Stan shocked. After this, she is able to continue her argument, on the basis that it's sometimes necessary to change symbols of a society as it naturally evolves to adopt new values and priorities. When the turn of Stan's team comes, Kyle gives their side of the issue by saying that killing is just a natural part of life and should not be a big deal. Shortly afterwards, Chef stands up and demands they address the racist aspect of the flag, only for him and the rest of the adults to discover that the children had not even perceived the flag as racist; Instead, they saw the flag depicting a man being hanged without registering his color, and they had just thought that the cause of the wedge issue was homicide.

Chef is touched by this, along with the other adults - even the KKK members present. While still acknowledging that he thinks the flag should be changed, Chef admits that when he believed the whole town was racist and threw the slur "cracker" around, he was the one being racist. Jimbo also apologizes for being on the KKK's side and tells Chef that he has no problem with black people; Chef in return assures Jimbo that he recognizes him as a good man. After Jimbo and Chef decide to come to a compromise, Kyle declares that they do not need to debate anymore, although Stan is still frozen with shock after seeing Wendy kissing Cartman. In the end, ethnic diversity is added to the flag: the black stick figure is now being hanged by a group of stick figures of different colors, including another black one to prevent racism; this new design is met with universal approval among the people of South Park. Chef delivers the moral of this story: his experiences with racism almost made him a racist himself, and that perceiving things according to race leads only to further racism.

In the final scene, Wendy says that she is glad that everything is over with and that her feelings for Cartman have disappeared. Cartman agrees and laughs nervously. Wendy runs after Stan, calling his name, leaving Cartman completely alone. After a few moments, Cartman sighs and walks away sadly, implying that he might have started to develop genuine feelings for Wendy.

== Production ==
According to the DVD commentary, the episode was based on the initial controversy over the display of the Confederate flag at the South Carolina State House.

Co-creator Matt Stone has characterized "Chef Goes Nanners" as "kind of half-baked. I remember we wanted to leave the office early. We were like, 'It's the 4th of July...'"
