= The Tooth Fairy's Tats 2000 =

- South Park episode
- Episode no.: Season 4 Episode 1
- Directed by: Trey Parker
- Written by: Trey Parker; Matt Stone; Nancy M. Pimental
- Production code: 402
- Original air date: April 5, 2000

Guest appearance
- Richard Belzer as Loogie

Episode chronology
← Previous "World Wide Recorder Concert"	Next → "Cartman's Silly Hate Crime 2000"
- South Park season 4

"The Tooth Fairy's Tats 2000" (also known as just The Tooth Fairy's Tats or The Tooth Fairy Tats) is the fourth season premiere and the 2nd produced episode of Comedy Central's animated television series South Park, and its 49th overall episode. It originally aired on April 5, 2000. The episode marks the first appearance of Timmy Burch. The plot follows the boys as they decide to make money from the tooth fairy, using other children's teeth, and then become involved with organized crime and the underground tooth market.

The episode was directed by series co-creator Trey Parker and written by series co-creators Trey Parker & Matt Stone and Nancy M. Pimental, being the last episode of the show to have co-writers credited aside from Parker until "Cupid Ye", which aired in 2023.

== Plot ==
The tooth fairy has visited Cartman, leaving him $2. He rushes to the bus stop to share his news with the others. He then unveils his latest plan. If they all combined their lost teeth, the tooth fairy will provide them with enough cash to purchase a Sega Dreamcast. However, Stan and Kyle have lost all their baby teeth, but not Kenny. Cartman tries to get teeth out of his mouth. It turns out Butters has a loose tooth and is waiting for the tooth fairy. Cartman decides to steal Butters' tooth, disguised as the tooth fairy, and place it under his own pillow. Cartman's mother is finally suspicious that he has "lost" 112 teeth and calls their dentist, Dr. Roberts. She also decides to come clean and admit there is no tooth fairy. Cartman tells this to Stan and Kyle, leading Stan to try a new plot with other kids to raise money for a Dreamcast that they place a tooth under a rich kid's pillow and steal the money. Meanwhile, the knowledge that the tooth fairy is not real prompts Kyle to question the truth of all things, including his own existence. He begins to study various philosophies about the nature of reality.

The boys soon find out that there are others who are in the tooth fairy business, and they are taken to the leader, Loogie, who has been the leader of the business after his two brothers. His business is keeping track of which houses his gang hits and having them put teeth under children's pillows, leaving a note for the parents to let them know that their children have lost teeth. They return to collect the money once they have finished the circuit of houses. He gives the four boys a choice: either they work for him and get a 2% cut of the money or have their penises cut off. They choose to work for him.

The American Dental Association is suspicious about the missing teeth and money, and the leader (Dr. Roberts) concludes that the culprit is a giant half chicken, half squirrel that steals either teeth or money from children as they sleep in order to build some kind of giant nest for its genetically superior and potentially dangerous offspring. Another dentist, Dr. Foley, logically concludes that the missing teeth and money are due to a black-market tooth racket that he has seen before in Montreal. The other dentists scoff at him and assume that Montreal is a fictional place.

The boys are now rather wealthy from the tooth racket, but Cartman persuades them to cut their ties to Loogie and make more profits. Loogie learns about this and tries to have Kenny drowned by tying his feet to concrete weights and throwing him into the Platte River, which only covers Kenny up to his ankles. The local TV news reports a story about a child, Billy, who needs $600 for a bone marrow transplant, and has recently lost a tooth, but his parents plan to leave him the money. The story is a trap set by Dr. Foley to prove the ADA wrong. (Although the report was a trap, Billy did have the illness and did need the money.) Loogie and his gang arrive to confront the boys for severing their ties, but as soon as Cartman finally catches the money, the trap is activated and all of the boys (including Loogie) are caught. Kyle, meanwhile, disappears while questioning his own existence, but soon reappears wielding control over all reality, even becoming the half-chicken half-squirrel beast, scaring both Loogie's gang and the ADA away. Only Stan, Cartman, and Loogie remain when Kyle eventually reappears back to normal. Loogie, despite being upset that he would fall for the ADA's trap, decides that the fall of his empire is a good thing, ending the tooth racket and hoping to try out for flag football. Meanwhile, Billy is saved, as he discovers the "tooth fairy"'s money under his bed.

As the credits roll, Kenny who is still attached to his concrete shoes, slowly hops through the shallow river and then falls into a deep spot. As he drowns, Timmy zooms across the bridge above and shouts his own name.

== Production ==
As explained in the FAQ on the official website, "When the year 2000 was coming up, everyone and their brother had '2000' in the titles of their products and TV shows. America was obsessed with 2000, so Trey Parker put '2000' in the titles to make fun of the ubiquity of the phrase."

The episode was directed by series co-creator Trey Parker and written by series co-creators Trey Parker & Matt Stone and Nancy M. Pimental, being the last episode of the show to have co-writers credited, as it would mark Parker as the main and only writer for all the episodes (with the exception of "Broadway Bro Down", which was written by Parker with Robert Lopez as an uncredited co-writer in 2011). Two other exceptions are "Trapped in the Closet" and "Cupid Ye", where the writing and directing was credited to John Smith and Matt Stone as a joke tying into the episodes.
