= Fat Camp (South Park) =

- South Park episode
- Episode no.: Season 4 Episode 15
- Directed by: Trey Parker
- Written by: Trey Parker
- Production code: 415
- Original air date: December 6, 2000

Episode chronology
← Previous "Pip"	Next → "The Wacky Molestation Adventure"
- South Park season 4

"Fat Camp" is the fifteenth episode of the fourth season of the animated television series South Park, and the 63rd episode of the series overall. "Fat Camp" originally aired in the United States on December 6, 2000 on Comedy Central. In the episode, Cartman is sent to lose weight at a fat camp where he discovers a different way to earn money. Meanwhile, Kenny starts doing crazy, disgusting acts for cash in a parody of the television show Jackass.

== Plot ==
During a science class, the boys dare Kenny to eat a manatee's spleen, which Kenny does in exchange for money. He then continues to undertake all manner of bizarre acts for more money, such as eating his own vomit. This leads to him getting his own television program, The Krazy Kenny Show, as a showcase for his outrageous behavior, but Jesus compares him to a prostitute since he takes money to perform acts that require no real talent. When the boys ask Chef to explain, he believes that they are referring to the sexual connotation of being a prostitute and sings a song about it with James Taylor.

Meanwhile, Cartman's mother, Liane and others from the town pay to send Cartman to fat camp against his will. There, a pair of overenthusiastic counselors try to teach him and other overweight children to exercise and live a healthier life, even using fake taco stands and ice cream trucks to catch kids who attempt to escape, referred to as an "Escaperoo" by the male counselor. Though Cartman resists, he soon reappears in South Park, having lost a great deal of weight resulting in a skinny appearance and displaying a more mature attitude. This "Cartman" is actually an escapee from a drug rehabilitation center near the fat camp, who has struck a deal with the real Cartman to smuggle junk food into the camp for him to sell. As a result, none of the other campers lose any weight and their parents (also overweight, and claiming their children are genetically predisposed to obesity) decide to take them home.

Along with shock comedians Tom Green and Johnny Knoxville, Kenny appears on The Howard Stern Show, where Howard Stern offers to pay them to perform oral sex on him. Kenny names the lowest price, but after performing the act, he is arrested for prostitution. When “Cartman” delivers the episode's moralizing statement, saying that it was wrong for them to have encouraged Kenny, Kyle gets suspicious and reveals the deception. At the fat camp, the kids reveal the real Cartman's junk food scheme, and their parents allow them to stay and try to lose weight properly. However, Cartman is banned from the camp; he rails against the counselors and campers, but later sobs as he eats the last doughnut from his stash by himself.

In exchange for not revealing the impostor's scheme with Cartman or his escape from the rehab center, Kyle forces him to carry out Kenny's latest stunt: spending six hours inside Mrs. Crabtree's uterus on live television. After said time, Mrs. Crabtree expels “Kenny” from her uterus, but he has died from the pressure on his body. She then expels the body of a second boy, to the host's great surprise.

== Production ==
This is one of the few episodes before "Kenny Dies" in which Kenny does not actually die, though someone impersonating him does. The Kenny storyline was based on Tom Green and the television show Jackass.
