= Cartman's Silly Hate Crime 2000 =

- South Park episode
- Episode no.: Season 4 Episode 2
- Directed by: Trey Parker; Eric Stough
- Written by: Trey Parker
- Production code: 401
- Original air date: April 12, 2000

Episode chronology
← Previous "The Tooth Fairy's Tats 2000"	Next → "Timmy 2000"
- South Park season 4

"Cartman's Silly Hate Crime 2000" is the second episode of the fourth season of the American animated television series South Park, and the 50th episode of the series overall. It is the first episode in production order of Season 4. It first aired on Comedy Central in the United States on April 12, 2000, and is the second of a four-episode run of titles ending in "2000". The episode contains a general commentary against hate crime legislation.

The episode was written by series co-creator Trey Parker, and was directed by Parker and Eric Stough. It is rated TV-MA in the United States.

== Plot ==
The third grade girls, led by the arrogant and foul-mouthed Lizzy, challenge the boys to a sled race down Phil Collins Hill. After the boys accept the challenge, Cartman gets into an argument with Token (Note: In 2022, the character Token's name was changed to Tolkien.) because he keeps reminding Cartman about his obesity. Cartman threatens to throw a rock at Token's head if he ever calls him fat again. Kyle calls Cartman a "fatass" instead, causing Cartman to accidentally throw the rock at Token, giving him a black eye in the process. Because Token is African-American, the Federal Bureau of Investigation and the entire media overreacts to the situation.

Assuming that the rock was thrown because of racism and not provocation, the government tries Cartman in a federal court. The prosecution's case, although utterly nonsensical, is accepted by the judge, who wishes to make an example out of Cartman to warn against racists. Cartman is convicted of a hate crime and sentenced to juvenile prison until he reaches the age of 21. Cartman escapes the courtroom and enlists Kenny and his toy car to try to flee to Mexico, but it goes extremely slow and they eventually fail after it runs out of battery. Cartman is taken to prison.

The boys realize that they have always taken Cartman's obesity for granted and without his weight on the back of their sled, they are doomed to lose. Clyde takes over for Cartman, since he is the second fattest in the grade (despite the fact that Clyde has normal weight like everyone else), and everyone immediately starts calling him "fatass", much to his dismay. When they sled down the hill, they find they are only average speed, as Cartman's fat "ass" helped the boys go faster. They kick Clyde off and instead use bricks disguised as a kid (having pants and a jacket on it) to help them get faster. However, the sled goes too fast and starts to spin, leading Kenny to be fatally crushed by the bricks.

After a failed attempt to sneak in a nail file hidden inside a cake for Cartman to bust out of jail, Stan and Kyle realize the only way to win is to make Token forgive Cartman. Token is willing to do so, but Token's father, who is against hate crime laws, tells the boys they will have to convince the governor of Colorado to free Cartman. The boys put on a presentation before the governor, complete with visual aids, in which they detail their opposition to hate crime laws, declaring it a "savage hypocracy" [sic] and arguing that all forms of crime warrant some sort of hate and that the laws serve only to encourage discrimination further. The governor is impressed, claiming that it made more sense than anything else he has heard in the last three years.

Meanwhile, Cartman adapts to life in prison by smuggling in things for his cellmate, Romper Stomper, who, along with Cartman, escapes the prison after feeling sorry for him and that he wishes to see Disneyland. They are caught by the authorities, who take Romper back to the prison, but tell Cartman that he has been pardoned by the governor. Cartman returns home, arriving at the sled race just as they are about to begin, and helps the boys beat the girls by throwing two yellow buckets (that Romper himself used as footwear until he gave them to Cartman) at the girls' sled, causing them to fall off a cliff and land on a pile of snow, after which Lizzy is carried off by a bear. The boys celebrate their victory and promise to Cartman that they will never exploit him ever again. After Pip refers to Cartman's "big fat-ass", Cartman throws a rock at Pip, but gets away with it as injuring British people does not count as a hate crime.

Cartman decides to pay a visit to Romper, who always wished to see Disneyland and grants his wish by defecating it (off-camera), having smuggled it in his anus, much to Romper's delight.

== Cultural references ==
- The number given to Cartman, 24601 is a reference to Jean Valjean’s prisoner number in the book Les Miserables
- The low-speed chase Kenny and Cartman get in with the police in Kenny's white Go-Go Action Bronco is a reference to the June 17, 1994 low-speed chase that O. J. Simpson led police on in a white Ford Bronco driven by Al Cowlings.

== Production ==
As explained in the FAQ section on the official website, "When the year 2000 was coming up, everyone and their mother had '2000' in the titles of their products and TV shows. America was obsessed with 2000, so Trey Parker put '2000' in the titles to make fun of the ubiquity of the phrase."

It is the first episode to feature the voice of Adrien Beard for the character Token. According to Parker, the episode is the creator's statement against hate crime legislation, which both Parker and Stone find "silly." Phil Collins Hill is a reference to Parker losing the Academy Award for Best Original Song to Collins. When Cartman is sent to prison, the music that plays is the music from the TV series Oz.
