= List of South Park characters =

South Park title image from season 17 with the four main characters: (left to right) Stan Marsh, Kyle Broflovski, Kenny McCormick, and Eric Cartman in the foreground and most of the recurring, supporting characters in the background.

South Park is an American adult animated television sitcom created by Trey Parker and Matt Stone for the Comedy Central television network. The ongoing narrative revolves around four 4th grade boys, Stan Marsh, Kyle Broflovski, Kenny McCormick, and Eric Cartman and their bizarre adventures in and around the fictional Colorado town of South Park. The town is also home to an assortment of characters who make frequent appearances in the show, such as students and their family members, elementary school staff, and recurring characters.

Stan Marsh is portrayed as the everyman of the group, as the show's official website describes him as "a normal, average, American, mixed-up kid." Kyle is the lone Jew among the group, and his portrayal in this role is often dealt with satirically. Stan and Kyle are best friends, and their relationship, which is intended to reflect the real-life friendship between South Park creators Trey Parker and Matt Stone, is a common topic throughout the series. Cartman—loud, obnoxious, and obese—is sometimes portrayed as the series' antihero and his antisemitic attitude has resulted in an ever-progressing rivalry with Kyle. Kenny, who comes from a poor family, wears his parka hood so tightly that it covers most of his face and muffles his speech. During the show's first five seasons, Kenny died in almost every single episode before returning in the next without explanation.

Stone and Parker perform the voices of most of the male South Park characters. Mary Kay Bergman voiced the majority of the female characters until her death in 1999. Eliza Schneider (1999–2003), Mona Marshall (2000–present), April Stewart (2004–present), and Kimberly Brooks (2008–present) have voiced most of the female characters since. A few staff members such as Jennifer Howell, Vernon Chatman, John Hansen, and Adrien Beard have voiced other recurring characters.

== Creation and inception ==
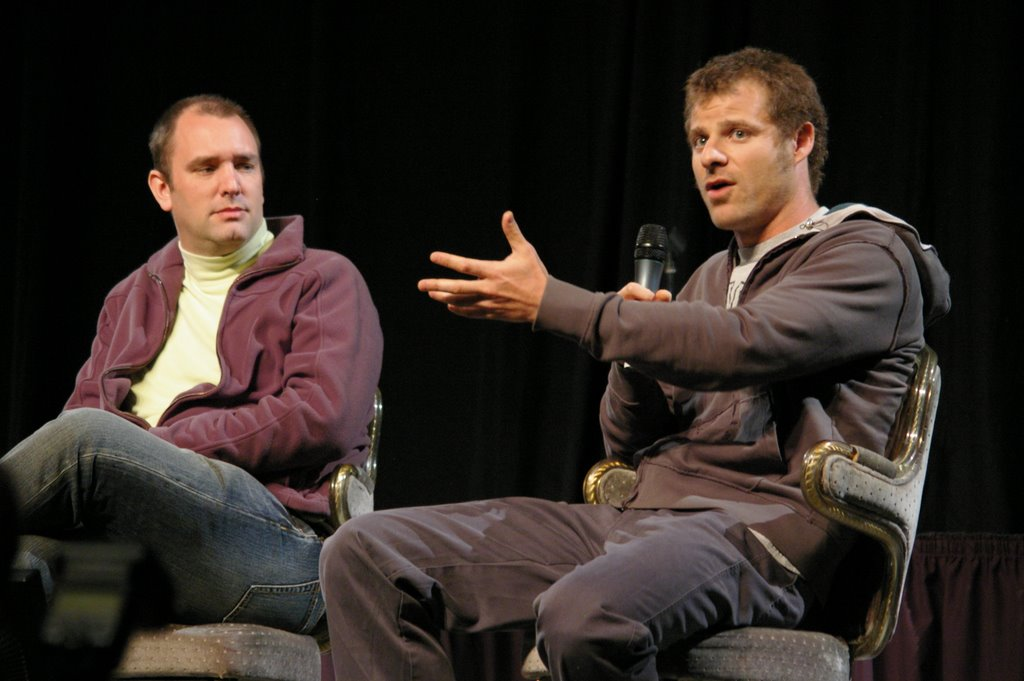
Trey Parker (left) and Matt Stone (right) created the show and currently voice the majority of the male characters on the show.

Following the success of the 1995 short Jesus vs. Santa, creators Trey Parker and Matt Stone conceived a plan to create a television series based on the short, with four children characters as the main stars. The series was originally set up at 20th Century Fox Television for its primetime premiere on FOX, which previously commissioned Parker and Stone to develop the short. However, FOX was not pleased with the show's inclusion of Mr. Hankey, a talking poo character, and felt it wouldn't bode well with viewers. The network's executives also said that placing kids as the stars could not be as funny and popular as it would with the grown-ups and families, like The Simpsons and King of the Hill.

As a result, Parker and Stone broke off relations with FOX and took the series somewhere else. They pitched the series to MTV and Comedy Central, and decided it was best suited for the latter, fearing the former could turn it to a more kid-friendly show later on. Comedy Central agreed to pick up the series, and the premiere episode, "Cartman Gets an Anal Probe", debuted on the network on August 13, 1997, while Mr. Hankey would debut in the tenth episode, "Mr. Hankey, the Christmas Poo".

In tradition with the show's cutout animation style, the characters are composed of simple geometrical shapes and uninflected patches of predominantly primary colors. They are not offered the same free range of motion associated with hand-drawn characters, as they are mostly shown from only one angle, and their movements are animated in an intentionally jerky fashion. Ever since the show's second episode, "Weight Gain 4000", all the characters on the show have been animated with computer software, though they are portrayed to give the impression that the show still utilizes the original technique of cutout animation.

=== Cast ===
Stone and Parker voice most of the male South Park characters. Mary Kay Bergman voiced the majority of the female characters until her death in 1999, near the end of the third season. Eliza Schneider and Mona Marshall succeeded Bergman in 1999 and 2000 respectively, with Schneider leaving the show in 2003, after the seventh season. She was replaced by April Stewart, who, along with Marshall, continues to voice most of the female characters. Bergman was originally listed in the credits under the alias Shannen Cassidy to protect her reputation as the voice of several Disney characters. Stewart was originally credited under the name Gracie Lazar, while Schneider was sometimes credited under her rock opera performance pseudonym Blue Girl.

Some South Park staff members voice other recurring characters; supervising producer Jennifer Howell voices student Bebe Stevens, writing consultant Vernon Chatman voices an anthropomorphic towel named Towelie, and production supervisor John Hansen voices Mr. Slave, the former gay lover of Mr. Garrison. South Park producer and storyboard artist Adrien Beard, who voices Tolkien Black, the only African-American child in South Park, was recruited to voice the character "because he was the only black guy [in the] building" when Parker needed to quickly find someone to voice the character during the production of the season four (2000) episode "Cartman's Silly Hate Crime 2000".

== Main characters ==
=== Stan Marsh ===
- Voiced by Trey Parker

Stanley "Stan" Marsh is voiced by and loosely based on series co-creator Trey Parker. He first appeared in The Spirit of Christmas and is portrayed (in words of the show's official website) as "a normal, average, American, mixed-up kid." Stan is a third- then fourth-grade student who commonly has extraordinary experiences not typical of conventional small-town life in his hometown of South Park. Stan is also commonly portrayed as the main protagonist of the series. He acts as the de facto leader of his friend group, often encouraging them in difficult times and taking charge in social causes. Much like his best friend Kyle, Stan often learns a valuable lesson by the end of episodes. Stan has black hair, light skin, blue eyes (animation error to be brown in the anime style in "Good Times with Weapons"), and is of average nine-year-old height. He usually wears a navy-blue beanie cap with a red trimming and a red pom-pom ball on the top of it, matching red gloves, a light-brown jacket with a matching red collar, blue jeans, and black shoes. Stan has his father's hair color (black) and his mother's skin tone.

=== Kyle Broflovski ===
- Voiced by Matt Stone

Kyle Broflovski is voiced by and loosely based on series co-creator Matt Stone. Having appeared first in The Spirit of Christmas shorts, he often displays the highest moral standard of all the boys and is usually depicted as the most intelligent. When describing Kyle, Stone states that both he and the character are "reactionary", and susceptible to irritability and impatience. In some instances, Kyle is the only child in his class to not initially indulge in a fad or fall victim to a ploy. This has resulted in both his eagerness to fit in, and his resentment and frustration. Kyle is distinctive as one of the few Jewish children on the show, and because of this, he often feels like an outsider amongst the core group of characters. His portrayal in this role is often dealt with satirically, and has elicited both praise and criticism from Jewish viewers. In many episodes, Kyle contemplates ethics in beliefs, moral dilemmas, and contentious issues, and will often reflect on the lessons he has attained with a speech that frequently begins with, "You know, I learned something today..." Kyle has curly red hair, a light skin tone, (no visible eye color due to how the series is animated), and is of average nine-year-old height. He wears a bright-green ushanka hat (ear-flap hat), matching green gloves, an orange coat with a matching green collar, army green cargo pants, and black shoes.

=== Eric Cartman ===
- Voiced by Trey Parker

Eric Theodore Cartman first appeared in the 1992 short series The Spirit of Christmas and is voiced by Parker. Although he is one of the show's main protagonists, Cartman has often served as an antagonist due to his short-tempered, aggressive, prejudiced and emotionally unstable character. These traits are significantly augmented in later seasons as his character evolves, and he begins to exhibit psychopathic and extremely manipulative behavior. Cartman is depicted as highly intelligent, able to execute morally appalling plans and business ideas with success. His intelligence goes further, as Cartman is shown to be a multi-linguist, able to speak many different foreign languages fluently. Among the show's main child characters, Cartman is distinguished as "the fat kid," for which he is continuously insulted and ridiculed. Cartman is frequently portrayed as a villain whose actions set in motion the events serving as the main plot of an episode. Other children and classmates are alienated by his insensitive, racist, homophobic, antisemitic, misogynistic, lazy, (Note: Except he would sometimes act in ways less lazy out of doing the simpler thing ironically, like trying to have a "flashback" in the episode and going through hard work just to have one rather than simply studying in the episode "I'm a Little Bit Country".) self-righteous, and wildly insecure behavior. Cartman is also the most prejudiced character on the show. He often makes antisemitic insults towards Kyle for being Jewish, constantly teases Kenny for being poor, particularly manipulates and mistreats Butters Stotch and displays an extreme disdain for hippies. As a result, Cartman usually gets the consequences for his actions due to a flaw in schemes or other characters proving to be smarter than him. Despite his antagonistic tendencies, Cartman has been portrayed as a protagonist or antihero on several occasions. He has short straight neatly-parted brown hair, pale skin, (no visible eye color due to how the series is animated), and an extremely fat body with neck flab and a double chin. Cartman wears a small teal hat with a small flat yellow puff-ball on top and a matching yellow band where the forehead part of the hat begins, a large bright-red coat, matching yellow gloves, brown khaki pants, and black shoes.

=== Kenny McCormick ===
- Voiced by Matt Stone (muffled voice and unmuffled voice as Mysterion), Eric Stough (main unmuffled voice), and Mike Judge (unmuffled voice in 1999 film and South American Biker Gangs)

Kenneth "Kenny" McCormick debuted in the 1992 shorts. His soft-muffled and indiscernible speech—the result of his parka hood covering his mouth—is voiced by co-creator Matt Stone. He is friends with Stan and Kyle, while maintaining a friendship with Eric Cartman. Kenny is regularly teased for living in poverty, particularly by Cartman. Prior to Season Six, Kenny died in almost every episode, with only a few exceptions. (Note: Exceptions include "Mr. Hankey, the Christmas Poo" and "Fat Camp". He also seems to die (but turns out to be alive) in some episodes, including "Rainforest Shmainforest" and the two-part episode "Do the Handicapped Go to Hell?" / "Probably".) The nature of the deaths was often gruesome and portrayed in a comically absurd fashion, and usually followed by Stan and Kyle respectively yelling "Oh my God! They killed Kenny!" and "You bastard(s)!". In the episode "Kenny Dies", Kenny dies after developing a terminal muscular disease, while Parker and Stone claimed that Kenny would not be returning in subsequent episodes and insisted they grew tired of having Kenny die in each episode. For most of season six, his place is taken by Butters Stotch and Tweek Tweak. Nevertheless, Kenny returned from the year-long absence in the season six finale "Red Sleigh Down", and has remained a starring character since, although he only appears once in Season 20. Kenny's character no longer dies in each episode, and has only been killed occasionally in episodes following his return. Kenny's superhero alter ego, Mysterion, first appeared in the season 13 episode "The Coon". It is revealed in the season 14 three-part story arc "Coon 2: Hindsight", "Mysterion Rises" and "Coon vs. Coon and Friends" that Kenny canonically has an ability to resurrect after dying, though he is always the only one who can ever remember dying, despite his friends always bearing witness. It is revealed that each time he dies, Kenny's mom spontaneously gives birth to him, and then is put back in his orange parka and in bed, to regenerate overnight. This was due to his parents' involvement in the cult of Cthulhu, whose meetings they would only attend because of the free alcohol. Kenny has bright-blond hair, a light skin color, blue eyes, and an average eight-year-old height. He wears a large orange parka whose large hood conceals his blond head completely with a faded-brown inside, matching faded-brown gloves, orange pants that match his parka, and black shoes. Kenny has a brother named Kevin, and a younger sister named Karen with whom he has a good relationship.

== Secondary characters ==
=== Butters Stotch ===
- Voiced by Matt Stone

Leopold "Butters" Stotch is a major character and a student of South Park Elementary. Butters is depicted as more naive, optimistic, and gullible than the show's other child characters and can become increasingly anxious, especially when faced with the likelihood of being grounded, of which he is extremely terrified. As a result, he is often sheltered and unknowledgeable of some of the suggestive content his peers understand, and is also frequently the victim of abuse and manipulation by Eric Cartman. Butters debuted as an unnamed background character when South Park first premiered on Comedy Central on August 13, 1997. His role gradually increased, becoming one of the series's most frequently present characters beginning with season 3 and eventually the de facto fifth main character. Creators Trey Parker and Matt Stone have stated that he is one of their favorite characters. He also has a supervillain alter ego named Professor Chaos.

=== Randy Marsh ===
- Voiced by Trey Parker, Sia (vocals of Randy as Lorde in "The Cissy"), and Patrick Stewart ("Something You Can Do with Your Finger")

Dr. Randy S. Marsh is a major character and the most prominent parent on the show. He is a middle-class married father who alongside his wife Sharon raises their 10-year-old son Stan and 13-year-old daughter Shelley. His first name is derived from the first name of series co-creator Trey Parker's father, and Parker describes Randy as "the biggest dingbat in the entire show."

Randy is 45 years old, and like Parker's father, is a geologist, making his first appearance in the series while monitoring a seismometer in the episode "Volcano" (parodying Pierce Brosnan in Dante's Peak). He was depicted to work at the South Park Center for Seismic Activity, and was later shown to work for the U. S. Geological Survey. He was briefly fired from his geologist job near the end of the 12th season, and quit briefly during the end of the 14th season, but has since been rehired both times. He also serves on the city council, specializing in the town's parks and public grounds. A recurring character trait of Randy's is his being prone to overreacting and obsessively seizing upon irrational ideas and fads, whether by himself or as part of a large contingent of the town's adult population. Though the show frequently depicts him to be a moderate to heavy drinker, numerous episodes have dealt with Randy's belligerent and negligent behavior brought upon by his severe intoxication.

A few instances of personal achievement have made Randy a hero in the eyes of his friends and fellow townsfolk, such as being awarded a Nobel Prize, and twice setting a record for producing the world's largest piece of human excrement. Randy has conversely been subjected to ridicule from the entire town, ranging from when he inadvertently accelerated the effects of global warming by suggesting the entire populace take on a more uninhibited approach to passing gas in order to avoid the hazard of spontaneous combustion, to when he reluctantly exclaimed "niggers" while attempting to solve a puzzle during a live broadcast of Wheel of Fortune. In addition to the professional singing he did in his youth, Randy can also play guitar, as seen in "Guitar Queer-O". He can also speak a little Mongolian, having learned some in college, as seen in the episode "Child Abduction Is Not Funny".

The episode "Gluten Free Ebola" revealed that Randy produces music and performs as the noted musician Lorde, a fact that was explored subsequently in "The Cissy". This has become a running gag that has continued through multiple episodes, such as suggesting much of the Marsh family's income comes from his music career as Lorde rather than his geology job. As of season 22, Randy quit his job and moved the family to the countryside where he sets up Tegridy Farms to grow and distribute cannabis. For most of season 23, Randy was officially the protagonist of South Park as the show focused on his work at the Tegridy Farms instead of the town of South Park and its elementary school. Randy is also responsible for the 2020-2023 COVID-19 pandemic after Mickey Mouse encouraged him to have sexual intercourse with a bat and a pangolin while he was sick during his trip in China ("Band in China").

=== Mr. Garrison ===
- Voiced by Trey Parker

Herbert Garrison was the boys' fourth grade teacher at South Park Elementary until his dismissal, after which he mounted a campaign that resulted in his election as President of the United States. Garrison is particularly cynical, especially in comparison with the rest of South Park's adults, and he is one of the few characters to ever break the fourth wall on the show. For the first eight seasons of the series, the character was known as Mr. Garrison. He underwent a sex change in the season 9 premiere "Mr. Garrison's Fancy New Vagina". The character was thereafter known to the other characters as Janet Garrison or Mrs. Garrison, despite being unmarried. In the season 12 episode "Eek, a Penis!", he undergoes yet another sex change operation, returning to being a man.

Mr. Garrison was in part inspired by a kindergarten teacher who taught Trey Parker, and who used a puppet named Mr. Hat as a teaching resource. Mr. Garrison was also inspired by a British literature professor Parker had at the University of Colorado; Parker said the voice he uses for the character is a dead-accurate impression of him. Parker said he believes Mr. Garrison has become one of the most complex characters on South Park, particularly due to his ever-growing relationship with Mr. Hat and his sexuality and gender issues; Parker said of Mr. Garrison, "He's the soap opera element to the whole series. [He] has a real story going on."

=== PC Principal ===
- Voiced by Trey Parker

Peter Charles, more commonly known as PC Principal, is the current principal of the school, having replaced Principal Victoria after she was fired in season 19; also an alumnus member of the PC Delta fraternity and an alumnus of Texas A&M University. He is dedicated to bring a more politically correct agenda to South Park Elementary. Though he is initially portrayed as an antagonist, particularly towards Stan, Kyle, Kenny, Cartman, and anyone else who is not "PC", he mellows out significantly in the middle of season 19. He is eventually revealed merely to be a pawn in the grand scheme of things, which causes him to become a protagonist in the season's final episode, "PC Principal Final Justice". PC Principal later married Strong Woman, who is the new assistant principal, and is the loving and caring father to their five children, the PC Babies.

During Season 27 and Season 28, in "Sermon on the 'Mount", he rebrands himself to Power Christian Principal, owing to President Donald Trump's push for more Christianity in public schools.

=== Mr. Mackey ===
- Voiced by Trey Parker

Mr. Mackey Jr. is the school guidance counselor. He has a disproportionately large head and mumbles "m'kay" after most sentences. He speaks with a Southern accent, and he is believed to be from Louisiana. It is assumed he is at least 40 years old (he once said he had sex at 19 and that it has been about 21 years since). He is based on Trey Parker's junior high school counselor, Stan Lackey. He has occasionally taught classes at the school, and taught sex education with Ms. Choksondik. During this time he had a sexual relationship with Ms. Choksondik. After her death, he took over the fourth grade class until Mr. Garrison returned.

Despite his awkward appearance and mannerisms, Mr. Mackey is an able and responsible counselor who, much unlike other South Park Elementary faculty and staff, cares about his students. He sometimes appears with Principal Victoria when punishing a student or announcing an important message. His methods as a counselor often reflect real-life controversies in education. For example, when Kyle talks about seeing Mr. Hankey the Christmas Poo, he places Kyle on a heavy dose prescription of Prozac. In an early episode, the children feign having attention deficit disorder, and he prescribes them all Ritalin. During a drug-education class in the episode "Ike's Wee Wee", he passes some marijuana around the classroom, and it is stolen (apparently by one of the children, though it is later revealed that the actual thief was Mr. Garrison). For this, Mr. Mackey is fired by the school and evicted by his landlord, and, feeling depressed, he ends up using alcohol, marijuana and LSD. The episode suggests that his large head is caused by the tightness of his tie around his neck, but in "Child Abduction Is Not Funny", his parents are shown to have large heads as well. He becomes a hippie and travels to India with a like-minded woman. Mr. Mackey is captured by The A-Team, and his former employers, along with Jimbo, say that they should have helped him with his drug problem rather than firing him. Mr. Mackey protests, saying that he likes his new life and that he actually has not done drugs since his first experimentations back in South Park. Nobody listens and in rehab at the Betty Ford Clinic, he is "cured" of his addiction to drugs. Mr. Mackey's social worker then re-ties his tie, which makes his head swell back to its original size.

=== Sharon Marsh ===
- Voiced by Mary Kay Bergman (1997–1999), Eliza J. Schneider (2000–2003), and April Stewart (2004–present)

Sharon Marsh is Stan and Shelley Marsh's mother, as well as Randy Marsh's wife. She first appeared in the Season One episode, "An Elephant Makes Love to a Pig".

Sharon was portrayed in earlier seasons as a loving but stern suburban mother. She wanted to protect Stan from the 'dirty' language and vulgar humor of his favorite cartoon, Terrance and Phillip, in "Death" and South Park: Bigger, Longer & Uncut. In "Spookyfish", she was so protective that she buried the bodies of people she thought Stan had killed, in order to prevent Stan from being charged with murder. In actuality, it was his new pet goldfish that murdered the people, to which Sharon felt regretful for not realizing in the first place. She was also unofficially in charge of the movement against Chinpokomon dolls in "Chinpokomon". However, she has often been caught up in fads around town, such as holistic medicine in "Cherokee Hair Tampons" and atheism in "Red Hot Catholic Love".

During the episodes in which she was voiced by April Stewart, Sharon had become the sane half of her marriage. She serves as a foil to the craziness that surrounds her; craziness is often caused by her husband, Randy. In "The Losing Edge", she was embarrassed by Randy getting drunk and starting fights at Stan's little league games. This was lost on Randy, who imagined her cheering him on in his big fight against the Bat Dad. In "With Apologies to Jesse Jackson", she is noticeably upset and disappointed in the car ride home after Randy says the N-word on Wheel of Fortune. In the Pandemic story arc, she gets repeatedly angry at Randy for videotaping the guinea pig attacks.

Sharon was referred to as "Carol" in the Season One episode, "Death", however, many characters had different names when they were first introduced.

Sharon Marsh is named after Trey Parker's mother, Sharon Parker.

=== Gerald and Sheila Broflovski ===
- Voiced by:
  - Gerald: Matt Stone
  - Sheila: Mary Kay Bergman (1997–1999), and Mona Marshall (1999–present)

Gerald and Sheila Broflovski are an upper-middle-class, Jewish married couple who raise their ten-year-old son Kyle and three-year-old Canadian son Ike. Gerald is a lawyer who also serves on South Park's council as the city attorney, and his role in this profession has been put on display in episodes such as "Sexual Harassment Panda" and "Chef Goes Nanners" in which a trial or legal issue plays a large part in the plot. He is a generally kind, amiable person, though at intervals he has been shown to assume a snobbish attitude that disaffects his friends and family. Examples include the episode "Chickenpox" where it is revealed that he used to be close with Stuart McCormick when they were younger but that the two had a falling out due to economic differences or when he begins acting like an arrogant snob after buying a hybrid car in "Smug Alert!". In "Sexual Harassment Panda", Gerald repeatedly sued South Park Elementary (which was faultless in every case), and later every citizen of South Park, showing his shameless monetary greed and disregard for civil propriety. Gerald was once seen to have a repressed gambling problem, and prior struggles with a fictional form of inhalant abuse known within the show as "cheesing". Gerald is, in season 20 of the show, revealed to be an internet troll. His internet alias is 'Skankhunt42', and initially, everyone thinks that Eric Cartman is, in fact, Skankhunt42. When trolling, he makes provocative statements against women, and, most notably, creates images where he "puts a dick in [women's] mouths". He always drinks red wine and listens to music by Boston when trolling. His antics eventually place him in the news after trolling a Danish Olympian making him of the two main antagonists of the entirety of season twenty alongside Lennart Bedrager.

Sheila made her first appearance in the season one episode "Death" (where she was originally named Carol), and she exhibits several traits commonly associated with those of a stereotypical Jewish mother. In the episode "It's a Jersey Thing", it is revealed that Sheila was originally from New Jersey, where she was known as "S-Wow Tittybang", and that she and Gerald moved to South Park to avoid having their newly conceived child grow up there. Apart from being briefly appointed to the fictional federal position of "Secretary of Offense" under the Clinton Administration, Sheila is a stay-at-home mother. In earlier seasons, Sheila often spearheaded public opposition to things she deemed harmful to children or to the Jewish community. She led a group to New York City to protest Terrance and Phillip, a Canadian comedy duo whose television show's toilet humor is what she believed to be a negative influence on Kyle. Her outrage escalated in South Park: Bigger, Longer & Uncut when she further protested Terrance and Phillip by forming "Mothers Against Canada", which eventually instigated a war between Canada and the United States making her one of the main antagonists of the film. At the climax of the film, she takes her crusade against the duo to the extreme by shooting Terrance and Phillip despite her son's protests, which fulfills an apocalyptic prophecy allowing Satan, his minions, and his ex-lover Saddam Hussein to invade Earth. This aspect has been toned down in recent years, and is more or less completely absent from newer episodes.

=== Liane Cartman ===
- Voiced by Karri Turner (unaired pilot), Mary Kay Bergman (1997–1999), Eliza Schneider (1999–2003), and April Stewart (2004–present)

Liane Cartman is the generally sweet-natured mother of Eric Cartman; though in later seasons, she is a more proactive mother who does not tolerate his antics or foul language. Her promiscuity, often with total strangers, was a running gag initially. It seemed as though all of the adults in South Park had slept with her. Although in episode 7, she is indicated to be a "crack whore", she says in "The Poor Kid" that she has not done drugs in some time, and works "two jobs." Liane's commuting from the home during normal daytime hours implies that at least one of the jobs is a traditional, non-prostitution form of employment, though the nature of this work is never specified. Despite the multiple sources of income, Eric comes to believe that he and Liane are the second poorest family in South Park (at least of those whose children attend South Park Elementary) after Kenny McCormick's. At other times, it is implied that the Cartman household's IRS-reported income mostly comes from government welfare programs, that Liane has simply transformed her prostitution career into a better-organized, safer "escort"-style operation, or that in fact Liane has never held a traditional job and the family is in a more precarious economic state than their depicted lifestyle indicates. As of season 29, current continuity states that Liane has been unable to maintain legitimate employment due to constant demands on her time from Eric, and as a result of this economic stress combined with increases in rent on the family's house, the Cartmans are unable to keep up with their bills and find themselves living in an abandoned hot dog stand. Eric refuses to allow Liane to work, instead of attend to him, when he is awake even when explicitly told that this will cause financial disaster for the family, a storyline which may tie in to depictions of Cartman as homeless in the future.

It is seemingly revealed in season 2 that Liane is a hermaphrodite (and so is Eric's father), though in episode "201" it is revealed that Eric's real father is Jack Tenorman, the father of his nemesis Scott Tenorman. Jack Tenorman was a member of the 1991 Denver Broncos, and the ruse about her being a hermaphrodite was made up to maintain the Broncos' reputation since "they were having a good year". She was named after creator Trey Parker's ex-fiancé, Liane Adamo, whom he broke up with after he discovered that she had an affair.

=== Stephen Stotch ===
- Voiced by Trey Parker, and Matt Stone ("Quintuplets 2000")

Stephen Willis Stotch is Butters Stotch's father and Linda Stotch's husband. He and his wife began appearing more frequently towards the end of the show's fourth season, in correlation with their son becoming a more significant character. His most prominent role as a couple with his wife occurred during the season five finale "Butters' Very Own Episode", in which they had to deal with the issues of Stephen's extramarital homosexual affairs and adhering to their concocted story about their son being abducted when Linda mistakenly thought she had successfully murdered Butters.

=== Jimmy Valmer ===
- Voiced by Trey Parker

James "Jimmy" Valmer (originally James "Jimmy" Swanson) is one of the boys' two handicapped classmates, alongside Timmy Burch. He is physically disabled, requiring forearm crutches in order to walk. His disability has never been specified on the show but seems visually and functionally similar to cerebral palsy. In Season 7 Episode 2 "Krazy Kripples", it is made clear that both Jimmy and Timmy were born with their disabilities. In any case, hampered by his legs, which in many cases he appears not to be able to use, Jimmy primarily uses his crutches both as substitutes for his legs and sometimes even as extra (weaponized) extensions for his arms. He prefers to be called "handi-capable". Jimmy is able to speak coherently, and his various aspirations on several different levels of journalism over time also sometimes even makes him more articulate than any of the other children, though his speech is largely affected by his stuttering, and sometimes also his tendency to end some of his sentences with "...very much". He aspires to be a stand-up comedian, and is often featured performing his routines. His catchphrase during his routines is "Wow, what a terrific audience!"

Jimmy first appears in the season five (2001) episode "Cripple Fight", in which he moves to South Park from a neighboring town and antagonizes Timmy. Parker and Stone initially intended for this to be Jimmy's only appearance, but decided to include the character in subsequent episodes. Now portrayed as a South Park resident, student, and good friend of Timmy, Jimmy has been a recurring character ever since. Jimmy's parents had made fun of disabled children in high school, and believe that Jimmy's disability is a punishment from God. The season eight (2004) episode "Up the Down Steroid" ends with Jimmy addressing the issue of anabolic steroid use in athletic competitions, declaring it as "cheating" while suggesting that professional athletes who use steroids voluntarily reject the accolades and records attributed to them. The episode also reveals that Jimmy has a girlfriend named Nancy. Jimmy is also commonly seen with Craig Tucker, Clyde Donovan, and Tolkien Black as part of "Craig's Gang". Despite his disability, he is also shown to be an extremely accomplished drummer, performing with Stan Marsh's death metal group Crimson Dawn in the episode "Band in China".

In the near future in the movie South Park: Post Covid, Jimmy has his own talk show named "Late Night with Jimmy", à la Jimmy Kimmel Live!, and is called "the king of woke comedy".

=== Wendy Testaburger ===
- Voiced by Karri Turner (unaired pilot), Mary Kay Bergman (1997–1999), Eliza Schneider (1999–2003), Mona Marshall (2003–2004), and April Stewart (2004–present)

Wendy Testaburger is the show's most prominent female student. Her best friend is Bebe Stevens, she is the on-and-off girlfriend of Stan. She is also the other voice of reason (besides Kyle). Wendy has previously been voiced by Karri Turner (in the unaired pilot), Mary Kay Bergman, Mona Marshall, Eliza Schneider, and is currently voiced by April Stewart. Fellow co-creator Matt Stone has also cited the name of Wendy Westerberg, the wife of an old friend from his childhood. She wears a pink beret, a purple coat and yellow pants. She has long black hair with uneven bangs. Wendy made her first appearance unnamed, but clearly recognizable, in "The Spirit of Christmas".

Like her boyfriend Stan, Wendy is mature for her age, critical of popular trends, moral and intellectual, as well as being a feminist, as noted in many of her appearances. She campaigns in several episodes on causes such as breast cancer and the suffering of Bottlenose dolphins, often arguing with Eric Cartman who calls her a "bitch" or "ho" in response. Although the two generally only argue, he pushes her to the limit in the Season 12 (2008) episode "Breast Cancer Show Ever" wherein the two engage in a fight on the playground, in which Wendy badly beats up Cartman.

Wendy is known to be protective of her relationship with Stan. In the Season 1 (1997) episode "Tom's Rhinoplasty" when Stan, along with the other boys, falls in love with an attractive substitute teacher, Wendy accuses her of stealing Stan from her, and eventually formulates a complex plan to get her thrown into the sun. She also sometimes displays jealousy – in the Season 6 (2002) episode "Bebe's Boobs Destroy Society", her best friend, Bebe Stevens, receives more attention than she does because of Bebe's developing breasts. Wendy then gets breast implants, but the boys end up ridiculing her after only just realizing the control Bebe's breasts had on them. This behavior is somewhat contradicted by episodes such as "Stupid Spoiled Whore Video Playset" and "Dances with Smurfs" where she is more concerned with principles than trends and attention.

Wendy is more prominent in the show's earlier seasons, usually quarreling with Eric Cartman or reinforcing her relationship with Stan. She speaks in several episodes (especially in the first season) and is often chosen to help the boys out over her classmates. Wendy and Stan's relationship received less focus over the course of Season 5 (2001), and she has only one minor role in Season 6 (2002). This culminates in her breakup with Stan and pairing with Tolkien Black in "Raisins", after which she makes only scattered prominent appearances until the end of the eleventh season, where she gets back together with Stan in "The List". They subsequently pair up as partners on a field trip in "Super Fun Time", she beats Cartman in a fight in "Breast Cancer Show Ever" and in the episode "Elementary School Musical" Stan suspects that she may leave him for a popular boy named Bridon. Wendy is able to kiss Stan on the cheek in "Elementary School Musical" without his previous nauseated reaction.

=== Clyde Donovan ===
- Voiced by Trey Parker, and Matt Stone (as Mosquito)

Clyde Donovan (Note: His canon name was originally Clyde Goodman until it was rewritten to be Clyde Donovan, then Clyde Harris, then back to Clyde Donovan.) maintains a friendship with the show's main characters and is among the most often-seen of the boys' extended group, playing supporting roles in several episodes. Clyde first appeared in the show's pilot episode "Cartman Gets an Anal Probe". He makes his first prominent appearance in the 1999 season 3 episode "Tweek vs. Craig" in which he tells everyone that both Tweek and Craig decided against fighting each other and went home instead. He has medium-brown hair, wears a burgundy coat, grayish-brown trousers, and sometimes wears ocean-blue mittens. In the season 4 episode "Cartman's Silly Hate Crime 2000", he is nominated as "the second fattest kid in class" besides Cartman, and is chosen to replace him in the sled race. The season 11 episode "Lice Capades" focuses heavily on Clyde and a group of anthropomorphic lice, who are portrayed as living in a civilized society on Clyde's head. Clyde was so embarrassed when a girl at the doctor's office asked what he was going in for that he said he had AIDS.

In "The List", the girls vote him the cutest boy in class, turning him into a superficial ladies' man, though this list is later revealed to have been manipulated by political considerations. Clyde appears in the three-part story arc "Coon 2: Hindsight", "Mysterion Rises", and "Coon vs. Coon and Friends" as his alter-ego, Mosquito. He is the focus of the episode "Reverse Cowgirl", in which he causes his mother Betsy's death when he fails to put the toilet seat down in their home, causing her to fall in and have her organs ripped out by the pressure. The episode also reveals Clyde's father's name to be Roger, and that he has a sister. In the episode South Park (Not Suitable for Children), it is revealed that Roger has remarried with a woman named Janice and Clyde had slowly accepted her as his stepmother.

Despite his friendship with the four main characters, Clyde serves as the main antagonist of the video game South Park: The Stick of Truth. He also plays a role as one of the main characters in South Park: The Fractured but Whole as his superhero alter-ego, Mosquito. who supposedly has the ability to control and has the abilities of a mosquito.

=== Tolkien Black ===
- Voiced by Trey Parker (1999), Adrien Beard (2000–present), and Lou Rawls (singing voice; "Wing")

Tolkien Black (also known as Token Black and Token Williams in "Here Comes the Neighborhood") first appeared in "Cartman Gets an Anal Probe". He is the only black child in South Park until the introduction of Nichole Daniels in "Cartman Finds Love" in season 16. Originally named "Token", "Token Williams", and finally "Token Black" as a play on the notion of a token black character, it is retconned in the second episode "The Big Fix" of the twenty-fifth season (2022) his first name is actually "Tolkien", after J. R. R. Tolkien. In the episode, Tolkien addresses an assembly hosted by Stan in which he states that he hates his namesake, saying that he finds J.R.R. Tolkien's work to be "a bunch of nerdy, jive-ass dragon shit". After his name was changed, Comedy Central changed the synopses and subtitles for every past episode that mentions the name "Token" to "Tolkien".

Episodes in which he plays a major role often address ethnicity-related topics. In "Here Comes the Neighborhood", he becomes self-conscious when his classmates mock him for being the wealthiest one in their class. He attempts to address this by inviting several other wealthy families to move to South Park (who all happen to be black) including Will Smith and Snoop Dogg, leading the townspeople to refer to them as "richers". When he realizes he does not fit in with his wealthy peers either, he goes to live with lions at the zoo, before he learns that his classmates mock him not because they do not like him, but because they all mock each other and because it is part of how they relate to each other.

In "Cartman's Silly Hate Crime 2000", his father declares hate crime legislation to be "a savage hypocrisy". In the season 11 (2007) episode "With Apologies to Jesse Jackson", Stan is perplexed by Tolkien's rebuffs of his attempts to make amends with Tolkien after Stan's father reluctantly exclaimed "niggers" when attempting to solve a puzzle as a contestant during a live taping of Wheel of Fortune. When Stan has an epiphany, he tells Tolkien "I've been trying to say that I understand how you feel, but I'll never understand. I'll never really get how it feels for a black person to [hear] somebody use the N-word", to which Tolkien accepts Stan's apology by saying "Now you get it".

=== Craig Tucker ===
- Voiced by Matt Stone

Craig Tucker, commonly characterized by his blue aviator or chullo hat and deep nasal monotone voice, is one of the more prominent members of the children's classroom. Craig dislikes the four main characters and rivals them in several episodes. Craig is a pragmatist and has no wish to become involved in any extraordinary adventures the other main characters on the show customarily experience. In the first several seasons, Craig has a habit of giving people the finger, a trait the show's official website attributes to his learning the behavior from his family, all of whom frequently use the gesture as well, most notably in the third season episode, "Tweek vs. Craig", in which his entire family take turns flipping each other off at the dinner table. This trait was used less throughout the show's runtime, and was last seen in the episode "Fun with Veal". Along with the rest of the characters, Craig moved to the fourth grade in "Fourth Grade".

Despite his dislike of the main characters, particularly Cartman, he is often depicted as one of the boys who repeatedly join Cartman in his many schemes, at times serving as a right-hand man. Craig is also involved in a homosexual relationship with fellow fourth-grade student Tweek Tweak. In the Season 19 episode "Tweek x Craig", female students of Asian backgrounds started drawing homoerotic "yaoi" images of Craig and Tweek, depicting them as lovers, in contrast to their rival-like role in "Tweek vs. Craig". Immediately, the two try to repudiate the rumors about them prompted by this. They eventually resolve to stage a public "break-up" to end the rumors. Though Tweek fears he cannot do this believably, Craig encourages him that he indeed can. However, Tweek goes too far by claiming that Craig is a manipulative cheater, which has the effect of ruining Craig's reputation with girls. During a later argument between the boys, Tweek reveals that Craig's encouragement gave him the confidence to believe in himself. Following the father-to-son talk between Craig and his father about how "you can't fight being gay", the two boys decide to continue their fake relationship, appeasing the town and maintaining their friendship. In later episodes however, such as the season 21 episode "Put It Down" and the video game The Fractured but Whole, they are shown to have become sincere romantic partners, calling each other "babe" and "honey" and holding hands regularly even when not around the townspeople.

=== Tweek Tweak ===
- Voiced by Matt Stone

Tweek Tweak is a fourth-grade student at South Park Elementary. He drinks lots of coffee, which is laced with methamphetamine, which causes him to be paranoid and have jittery muscle spasms. He made his first appearance in the Season Two episode "Gnomes". He was meant to replace Butters as the fourth member of the group following Kenny McCormick's death. Tweek's namesake, physical appearance, clothing, and speaking voice all match his personality, behaviors, mannerisms, and general nature. Tweek obviously has an anxiety disorder. As a character who is almost always under near constant anxiety, his catchphrase is either "Too much pressure!" or "GAAH! Too much pressure!". When anxious, he will usually exclaim "That's too much pressure!". He usually likes to refer to other members his own age and gender as "man" in his speech.

Beginning with "Tweek x Craig", Tweek is allegedly in a relationship with Craig Tucker. In "Wieners Out", Butters refers to the two as a gay couple when encouraging his male peers to join his movement. Despite their relationship being forced at the start, the two stay together of their own free will and are now more open about their sexualities and their relationship. In "Put It Down", Craig refers to Tweek as "honey" and "babe" even when not in front of other people. Assuming this means that they are actually in a relationship and they are not faking for publicity. This is further shown with them as adults in the future, where they still spend the most time together and are inferred to still be together.

Tweek's personality matches his appearance and his way of speaking. He is rarely seen smiling or expressing positive emotions, being almost constantly on the verge of outright panic. He is usually seen gritting his teeth or generally flipping out. Sometimes he may seem slightly calmer with fewer twitches and spasms when around his boyfriend Craig. He also appears to be easily manipulated, making him a frequent pawn of Cartman's plots ("The Simpsons Already Did It", "Free Hat"), although he does maintain a disliking to Cartman as most others do.

=== Chef ===
- Voiced by Isaac Hayes, Trey Parker (singing, in "Succubus"), and Peter Serafinowicz (Darth Chef)

Jerome "Chef" McElroy was a major character in the first nine seasons of the show. He was voiced by Isaac Hayes. The former cafeteria worker at South Park Elementary, Chef is generally portrayed as more intelligent than the other adult residents of the town, and understanding to the children. His advice is often sought by the boys, as he is the only adult they completely trust. He frequently gives completely honest advice without considering whether it is appropriate for children, usually in the non sequitur form of a lascivious soul song.

Chef was inspired by Hayes and other popular soul singers of the 1970s, as well as an actual dining hall worker encountered by Parker while he attended the University of Colorado. Chef played a less prominent role as the series progressed beyond its earlier seasons, and the character was retired at the beginning of the tenth season in "The Return of Chef" following the controversial departure of Hayes.

=== Terrance and Phillip ===
- Voiced by:
  - Terrance: Matt Stone
  - Phillip: Trey Parker

Introduced in the first season, Sir Terrance Henry Stoot and Sir Phillip Niles Argyle are two Canadian comedians who host The Terrance and Phillip Show: a sketch comedy program which the children of South Park adore. The duo have been compared to Bob and Doug McKenzie as well as Beavis and Butt-Head for their cartoonishly exaggerated stereotypical Canadian mannerisms and crude humor respectively. Series creators Trey Parker and Matt Stone have explained that they view the Canadians as stand-ins for themselves, and often utilize their sketch comedy show to comment on South Park itself. Bolstering this claim, the children have occasionally made reference to the show being animated, with Eric Cartman explaining that he finds the animation "crappy" in South Park: Bigger, Longer & Uncut, though it is subsequently revealed that all Canadians are depicted in a visually similar manner.

Both South Park: Bigger, Longer & Uncut and "Freemium Isn't Free" explain that the success of Terrance and Phillip's show accounts for the majority of Canada's economy. In the episode "Terrance and Phillip: Behind the Blow", it is revealed that the two met in "The Canadian School for Gifted Babies", and began performing across Canada due to their aptitude for musical theater, eventually leading them to perform across North America. Their show features crude low-brow humor, with the punchline often involving the duo farting on one another. In South Park: Bigger, Longer & Uncut the Canadians explain to Conan O'Brien that this is a staple of their country's humor, and go on to explain a variety of "classic Canadian jokes" which are similarly crude and low-brow, although it is later revealed that Terrance pioneered this style of humor accidentally when he farted during an appearance on The Ed Sullivan Show.

The two are nearly identical in design (though Terrance is occasionally depicted as fatter than Phillip), with their only distinguishing features being their hair color and their shirts: Phillip is blonde while Terrance is black-haired, their respective shirts are marked with the letters T and P. Phillip is generally depicted as a more serious actor than his costar, having briefly performed in a production of Hamlet and vehemently protesting the Canadian Broadcasting Company's decision to censor a depiction of the prophet Muhammed in their show, thought it is revealed in Terrance and Phillip: Behind the Blow that Terrance is responsible for much of the content of the duo's show: having written the majority of the sketches they perform. In the episode "Eat, Pray, Queef", they are married to the Queef Sisters: two female comedians who briefly overshadow the duo (though the sisters' show is later canceled offscreen).

Other characters in Terrance and Phillip's in-universe show include Ugly Bob- a brown-haired man identical in appearance to Terrance and Phillip who sports an orange shirt with a lower-case "b" on it who is forced to wear a paper bag on his head as he is perceived as extraordinarily unattractive to other Canadians (though, he claims Americans do not notice this, simply believing him to "look Canadian"), and Scott The Dick: an uptight and abrasive Canadian who often clashes with Terrance and Phillip. Scott becomes poisoned by radiation, thus leading him to grow in size, thus he is referred to as a "giant dick".

The plot of South Park: Bigger, Longer & Uncut centers on the release of Asses of Fire: a film starring Terrance and Phillip, and Kenny's attempt to mimic a scene from the film. Asses of Fire causes a mass hysteria among parents whose children attempt to mimic the vulgar language featured throughout the movie. Mothers Against Canada is thus formed in order to vilify the duo and the entirety of Canada for the crass crude nature of Terrance and Phillip's work.

== Recurring characters ==
Character	Voiced by	Role	First appearance
Shelley Marsh	Mary Kay Bergman, Eliza Schneider, April Stewart	Stan's violent, snobbish, ill-tempered and mischievous older sister who despises her brother and his friends.	Season 1, episode 5 "An Elephant Makes Love to a Pig"
Ike Broflovski	various children of South Park employees Currently: Betty-Boogie Parker	Kyle's younger brother, the Canadian-born adoptive son of Gerald and Sheila.	Season 1, episode 1 "Cartman Gets an Anal Probe"
Linda Stotch	Mona Marshall	Butters' (sometimes) mentally unstable mother. She is also strict like her husband, but not as much.	Season 4, episode 16 "The Wacky Molestation Adventure"
Timmy Burch	Trey Parker	One of the boys' two handicapped classmates, whose vocabulary is mostly limited to the enthusiastic shouting of his own name. Jimmy's best friend.	Season 4, episode 1 "The Tooth Fairy's Tats 2000"
Scott Malkinson	Matt Stone	A classmate of the boys, who they often make fun of for his lisp and diabetes.	Season 8, episode 6 "The Jeffersons" (HD Version) " Season 12, episode 13 Elementary School Musical" (Original)
Jason White	Trey Parker	A student known for his love of sports. Though he has rarely spoken, he was a part of the boys' extended circle of friends, often seen with the members of Craig's Gang. Killed off in "Season Finale", after he was run over by a police car.	Season 1, episode 1 "Cartman Gets an Anal Probe"
Bebe Stevens	Jennifer Howell	The boys' blonde female classmate, Wendy's best friend, Clyde's on-again, off-again girlfriend, and the only child of Mr. and Mrs. Stevens.	Season 1, episode 1 "Cartman Gets an Anal Probe"
Mayor McDaniels	Mary Kay Bergman, Eliza Schneider, April Stewart	The Mayor of South Park.	Season 1, episode 2 "Volcano"
Harrison Yates	Trey Parker	A police detective, married to Maggie with an unnamed son.	Season 7, episode 9 "Christian Rock Hard"
Strong Woman	Jessica Makinson	The vice principal of the school beginning in "Super Hard PCness", who is in a secret relationship with PC Principal. She later gives birth to five children, the PC Babies	Season 21, episode 9 "Super Hard PCness"
Towelie	Vernon Chatman	A talking stoner towel; father of Washcloth.	Season 5, episode 8 "Towelie"
Jimbo Kern	Matt Stone	Sharon's brother, Randy's brother-in-law, and Stan's uncle, who is portrayed as a hunter, TV show host, and gun store owner.	Season 1, episode 2 "Volcano"
Ned Gerblansky	Trey Parker	A hunter and a soldier in the Vietnam War. Jimbo Kern's best friend who lost his right arm and speaks through an electric voicebox.	Season 1, episode 2 "Volcano"
Stuart McCormick	Matt Stone	Kenny's alcoholic and violent father.	Season 1, episode 6 "Death"
Carol McCormick	Mary Kay Bergman, Eliza Schneider, April Stewart	Kenny's alcoholic and violent mother.	Season 1, episode 8 "Starvin' Marvin"
Heidi Turner	Jessica Makinson	One of the boys' female classmates, who briefly was Cartman's on-again, off-again girlfriend.	Season 3, episode 1 "Rainforest Shmainforest"
Nichole Daniels	Kimberly Brooks	Nichole is part of the group of girls at South Park Elementary, with Wendy, Red, Bebe and Heidi. Cartman secretly arranges for her and Tolkien Black to be together.	Season 16, episode 7 "Cartman Finds Love"
Red McArthur	Mary Kay Bergman; Eliza J. Schneider; April Stewart; Currently: Mona Marshall	Red is one of the girl characters, she is often seen in the larger friend group of the fourth grade girls, including Wendy, Bebe, and Heidi. She later becomes Butters' girlfriend.	Season 1, episode 1 "Cartman Gets an Anal Probe"
Principal Victoria	Mary Kay Bergman (seasons 1-3); Eliza J. Schneider (seasons 4-7); April Stewart (seasons 8-present)	The former principal of South Park Elementary School. She spoke with an Upper Midwestern accent and was rational. She was often seen with the school counselor.	Season 1, episode 7 "Pinkeye"
Officer Barbrady	Trey Parker	The town's highly untrained and undereducated police officer with a heart of gold.	Season 1, episode 1 "Cartman Gets an Anal Probe"
Grandpa Marvin Marsh	Trey Parker	Randy's father and Stan's grandfather, who attempts to kill himself or have others do so in “Death”. He has Alzheimer's disease, and often referring to Stan as "Billy" as a result.	Season 1, episode 6 "Death"
Father Maxi	Matt Stone	The town's Catholic priest, who is a moral voice and works to help the town.	Season 1, episode 9 "Mr. Hankey, the Christmas Poo"
Tuong Lu Kim	Trey Parker	The owner of City Wok, a local Chinese restaurant, known for his incredibly thick Chinese accent. It is later discovered that Lu Kim is not actually a Chinese man but rather one of many personalities of William Janus, a therapist with multiple personality disorder. His surname is taken from the Roman god Janus, who is depicted with two faces.	Season 6, episode 1 "Jared Has Aides"
Michael	Matt Stone	Known as the Goth Kids, this clique of four stereotypically goth children often hang out behind the school, at a local coffee shop, or sometimes in the bedroom of Henrietta, one of their members. They typically listen to goth music and smoke cigarettes.	Season 7, episode 14 "Raisins"
Pete Thelman	Trey Parker	Known as the Goth Kids, this clique of four stereotypically goth children often hang out behind the school, at a local coffee shop, or sometimes in the bedroom of Henrietta, one of their members. They typically listen to goth music and smoke cigarettes.	Season 7, episode 14 "Raisins"
Henrietta Biggle	Jessica Makinson	Known as the Goth Kids, this clique of four stereotypically goth children often hang out behind the school, at a local coffee shop, or sometimes in the bedroom of Henrietta, one of their members. They typically listen to goth music and smoke cigarettes.	Season 7, episode 14 "Raisins"
Firkle Smith	Nico Agnone Sebastian Yu Tyrone Jenkins Bill Hader (South Park: The Stick of Truth)	Known as the Goth Kids, this clique of four stereotypically goth children often hang out behind the school, at a local coffee shop, or sometimes in the bedroom of Henrietta, one of their members. They typically listen to goth music and smoke cigarettes.	Season 7, episode 14 "Raisins"
Mr. Slave	John Hansen	Mr. Garrison's former lover and classroom assistant, who later married Big Gay Al.	Season 6, episode 14 "The Death Camp of Tolerance"
Jesus	Matt Stone	The central figure of Christianity, Jesus lives in an ordinary house and hosts a talk show on the local television station, and is the leader of the Super Best Friends, a superhero team primarily composed of religious figures.	The Spirit of Christmas: Jesus vs. Frosty
Mr. Hankey	Trey Parker	A sentient piece of poo who serves as a figure of Christmas. He is kicked out of South Park in "The Problem with a Poo" over some offensive social media posts, ending up in Springfield.	Season 1, episode 9 "Mr. Hankey, the Christmas Poo"
Satan	Trey Parker	The ruler of Hell, portrayed with the outline of a massive phallus upon his abdomen and chest. Killed by ManBearPig in "Nobody Got Cereal?", ironically raising up to heaven afterwards. By the time of "Sermon on the 'Mount", he would be revived and would be the boyfriend of Donald Trump.	Season 1, episode 10 “Damien”
Saddam Hussein	Matt Stone	The former dictator of Iraq who repeatedly schemes to take over Canada, often successfully. He is briefly the boyfriend of Satan, and the central antagonist of South Park: Bigger Longer and Uncut.	Season 2, episode 1 “Terrance and Phillip in Not Without My Anus”
Nathan	Trey Parker	Nathan is a child with Down's Syndrome who appears to adults to be an innocent child, but in reality he is a cunning and shrewd manipulator. He is frequently involved in questionable or criminal activity. His arch-rival is Jimmy Valmer, and by extent, Jimmy's friend, Timmy Burch. He is often accompanied by his burly sidekick, Mimsy.	Season 8, episode 2 "Up the Down Steroid"
Mimsy	Matt Stone	Mimallah "Mimsy" is a mentally handicapped student at South Park Elementary. He is Nathan's henchman in the episodes "Crippled Summer", "Handicar", and "Moss Piglets".	Season 14, episode 7 "Crippled Summer"
Darryl Weathers	Trey Parker	A middle-class construction worker who made his first appearance in Season Eight episode "Goobacks", as a worker who was upset over losing his job to immigrants from the future. Since then, he has made numerous appearances, often leading other redneck or working class characters in chanting "They took our jobs!".	Season 8, episode 7 "Goobacks"
Big Gay Al	Matt Stone	Former scout leader who used to own a sanctuary for gay animals; portrayed as the show's stereotypical gay character.	Season 1, episode 4 "Big Gay Al's Big Gay Boat Ride"
Dr. Alphonse Mephesto	Trey Parker	Local mad scientist and Brando look-alike.	Season 1, episode 5 "An Elephant Makes Love to a Pig"
Kevin Mephesto	Trey Parker	Dr. Alphonse Mephesto's adoptive son and his lab assistant. Kevin is a quiet character who doesn't have any lines, except for him screaming in “201”.	Season 1, episode 5 "An Elephant Makes Love to a Pig"
Santa Claus	Trey Parker	A figure of Christmas, who often makes appearances in the show during Christmas-themed episodes.	The Spirit of Christmas: Jesus vs. Frosty
Pip Pirrup	Matt Stone	The boys' unpopular, stereotypically British classmate, based on the main character in Charles Dickens' 1861 novel Great Expectations. Killed off in "201" by Mecha-Streisand.	Season 1, episode 1 "Cartman Gets an Anal Probe"
Bradley Biggle	Matt Stone	The younger brother of Henrietta Biggle, Bradley was portrayed as a background character until his first major appearance in the Superheroes Saga, beginning with "Coon 2: Hindsight" as Mintberry Crunch. It is actually revealed later on that he indeed is a real superhero with real breakfast cereal-themed superpowers.	Season 3, episode 1 "Rainforest Shmainforest"
Kevin Stoley	Matt Stone	Frequently used as a background character. He wears a light-blue jacket and red gloves. He has an interest in Star Wars and Star Trek, and often quotes lines from them, triggering a response from Cartman saying "Kevin, goddammit." He has a major role in "Fatbeard" where he joins Eric and other kids to sail to Somalia.	Season 1, episode 1 "Cartman Gets an Anal Probe"
Dougie O'Connell	Trey Parker	Dougie is shown to be a loud and lonely kid. Like Butters, he is often picked on. He hangs out with other outcasts and is claimed to be a nerd by others. During Butters' stunts as his supervillain alter ego, Professor Chaos, Dougie joins him as his sidekick, General Disarray.	Season 3, episode 8 "Two Guys Naked in a Hot Tub"
Karen McCormick	Celeste Javier, Colleen Villard	Kenny's shy and reclusive younger sister, who looks to Kenny for protection and comfort when she is upset.	Season 9, episode 4 "Best Friends Forever"
Kevin McCormick	Trey Parker	The eldest child of Stuart and Carol McCormick. He is Kenny and Karen's older brother.	Season 1, episode 8 "Starvin' Marvin"
Skeeter	Trey Parker	Skeeter is the current owner and bartender of Skeeter's Wine Bar and a prominent townsperson. He made his first cameo appearance in the Season One episode, "Cartman's Mom is a Dirty Slut", but his first prominent appearance was in the Season Three episode, "Sexual Harassment Panda". He is often seen at his bar or leading protests.	Season 3, episode 6 "Sexual Harassment Panda"
Diane Choksondik	Trey Parker	Diane Choksondik replaced Mr. Garrison as the 4th grade teacher. Her death occurred in season 6 episode 7 “The Simpsons Already Did It”. Though, her death was shown in "Professor Chaos".	Season 4, episode 11 ”Fourth Grade”
Margaret Nelson	Kimberly Brooks	Margaret Nelson was a former fourth-grade teacher at South Park Elementary after Herbert Garrison left to run for president until he get his job back. She first appeared in the Season Nineteen episode, "The City Part of Town" and died from COVID-19 in the Vaccination Special.	Season 19, episode 3 "The City Part of Town"
Scott Tenorman	Toby Morton Trey Parker	Scott Tenorman is the kid Cartman humiliates in front of a crowd of onlookers at the Chilli Con Carnival in the episode “Scott Tenorman Must Die”. Cartman tricked Scott into eating his own parents in front of his favorite band, Radiohead.	Season 5, episode 4 ”Scott Tenorman Must Die”
Betsy	Betty-Boogie Parker	She was part of Lil' Qties, the children's arm of the conspiracy theory group QAnon. She is based on Betty Boogie Parker, Trey Parker's daughter. She became an average South Park Elementary student.	Season 24, Episode 1 “South ParQ Vaccination Special
Les Claypool		Les Claypool is a singer and bassist. He is best known on South Park as the singer of the South Park Theme, composed by PRIMUS. He and PRIMUS also recorded "Mephesto and Kevin" for Chef Aid: The South Park Album. Claypool is visible in the original South Park intro, where he is shown walking through the town of South Park, singing and playing an acoustic bass guitar.	Season 2 Episode 14 Chef Aid
The New Kid/Douchebag/Dovahkiin	Trey Parker	The New Kid, also known as Butthole, Buttstuff, and Douchebag in South Park canon, is the main protagonist of every South Park Video Game, Their "real name" is revealed by the Big Bad Government Guy to be Dovahkiin (in reference to the protagonist of The Elder Scrolls V: Skyrim), but the only time they are addressed to by that name is when the Big Bad Government Guy starts exposing information about the New Kid. It is also unknown whether this name is the real name or a simple code name.	South Park: The Stick of Truth

== Reception and impact ==
Kyle, Cartman, Stan and Kenny have all appeared on the cover of Rolling Stone magazine.

Cartman is a South Park fan favorite, and is often described as the most iconic character from the series. With a headline to their online written version of a radio report, NPR declared Cartman as "America's Favorite Little $@#&*%". "Respect my authoritah!" and "Screw you guys ...I'm going home!" became catchphrases and, during the show's earlier seasons, were highly popular in the lexicon of viewers. His eccentric enunciation of "Hey!" was included in the 2002 edition of The Oxford Dictionary of Catchphrases. Stone has said that when fans recognize him or Parker, the fans will usually do their imitation of Cartman, or, in Parker's case, request that he do Cartman's voice. Both Cartman's commentary and the commentary resulting in response to his actions have been interpreted as statements Parker and Stone are attempting to make to the viewing public, and these opinions have been subject to much critical analysis in the media and literary world.

Cartman ranked 10th on TV Guide's 2002 list of the "Top 50 Greatest Cartoon Characters", 24th on TV Guide's "25 Greatest TV Villains", 198th on VH1's "200 Greatest Pop Culture Icons", and 19th on Bravo's "100 Greatest TV Characters" television special in 2004. When declaring him the second-scariest character on television (behind only Mr. Burns of The Simpsons) in 2005, MSNBC's Brian Bellmont described Cartman as a "bundle of pure, unadulterated evil all wrapped up in a fat—er, big-boned—cartoony package" who "takes a feral delight in his evildoing".

While Parker and Stone portray Stan and Kyle as having common childlike tendencies, their dialogue is often intended to reflect stances and views on more adult-oriented issues, and have been subject to much critical analysis in the media and literary world and have frequently been cited in publications by experts in the fields of politics, religion, popular culture and philosophy. Kenny's deaths are well known in popular culture, and was one of the things viewers most commonly associated with South Park during its earlier seasons. The exclamation of "Oh my God! They killed Kenny!" quickly became a popular catchphrase, while both Kenny and the phrase have appeared on some of the more popular pieces of South Park merchandise, including shirts, bumper stickers, calendars and baseball caps, and inspired the rap song "Kenny's Dead" by Master P, which was featured on Chef Aid: The South Park Album. The catchphrase also appears in MAD magazine's satire of TITANIC where Stan, Kyle and Cartman are shown on a lifeboat while they were supposedly escaping from the sinking ship. Kenny's deaths have been subject to much critical analysis in the media and literary world. When Sophie Rutschmann of the University of Strasbourg discovered a mutated gene that causes an adult fruit fly to die within two days after it is infected with certain bacteria, she named the gene "Kenny" in honor of the character.

== Merchandise ==
The characters of the South Park franchise have spawned several merchandise items, varying from toys to apparel items. In 2004, the first action figure collection was released by Mirage Toys containing five series each with four characters. In 2006, Mezco toys released a second collection containing a total of six series, each containing six or four figures. Comedy Central itself has made available a variety of products through its website, including T-shirts, figures, hats, pants, and even shot glasses. A number of fan websites provides an even more extended amount of merchandise, ranging from posters, to magnets, ties and even skateboards, South Park Studios offer through their website the possibility of creating personalized South Park avatars. Similar possibilities have been available on multiple fan sites.

== See also ==
- South Park (Park County, Colorado)
- South Park City
