= Liane Cartman =

- South Park character
- First appearance: "Cartman Gets an Anal Probe" (1997)
- Created by: Trey Parker; Matt Stone
- Designed by: Trey Parker; Matt Stone
- Voiced by: Karri Turner (unaired pilot); Mary Kay Bergman (1997–1999); Eliza Schneider (1999–2003); April Stewart (2004–present)

In-universe information
- Full name: Liane Cartman
- Gender: Female
- Occupation: Former Pornstar; Prostitute; Model for Crack-whore magazine; Dominatrix; Former Real Estate Agent
- Family: Mabel Cartman (mother); Harold Cartman (father); Howard Cartman (brother); Stinky Cartman (brother); Bob Cartman (brother); Lisa Cartman (sister-in-law); Florence Cartman (grandmother); Elvin Cartman (nephew); Fred Cartman (nephew); Alexandra Cartman (niece)
- Children: Eric Cartman
- Religion: Christianity (Roman Catholicism)
- Nationality: American
- Residence: South Park, Colorado, United States

Liane Cartman, formerly known as Carol Cartman (Note: As shown in Death.), is a fictional character in the adult animated television series South Park. She is the single mother of main character Eric, who raises him in the fictional town of South Park, Colorado. Liane is considered one of the more prominent parents of all the South Park parents, as she makes many appearances throughout the series.

Liane first appeared in the series' first episode "Cartman Gets an Anal Probe", which premiered on Comedy Central on August 13, 1997. Though the first episode, as well as the "Spirit of Christmas" shorts made by series co-creators Trey Parker and Matt Stone, were animated with construction paper through stop motion, after the series third episode, "Weight Gain 4000", she is animated with a computer and rendered to mimic that style. Liane is named after co-creator Parker's ex-fiancée Liane Adamo, who broke up after he discovered she had an affair. She was originally voiced by Mary Kay Bergman, and later Eliza Schneider, and currently April Stewart.

As she frequently appears in the series, Liane has also appeared in many South Park-related media. This includes appearing in the 1999 film South Park: Bigger, Longer, & Uncut, as well video games like South Park: The Stick of Truth and South Park: Phone Destroyer.

== Character ==
Liane is named after Liane Adamo, the ex-fiancée of series co-creator Trey Parker, who broke up after Adamo committed infidelities against Parker. Like many of the other characters in the series, Liane consists of simple geometric shapes. She has long brunette hair, usually tied in a bun, and wears a turquoise sweater and brick red trousers; her outfit is quite similar to her son's, with her sweater having the color as his knit cap, and her trousers having the same color as his coat. Liane also has the average height of an adult female character in the series.

In the earlier seasons, Liane was frequently shown giving people of the town of South Park her baking, mostly cookies. Coincidentally, there is a picture with her and her son at Mount Rushmore where Liane is holding a plate of cookies. One example of her generosity is seen in "Cartman's Mom is a Dirty Slut", where she gives a plate of cookies to Officer Barbrady at the Drunken Barn Dance.

Yet, like Eric, there are numerous implications that she is racist and antisemitic; usually in the earlier seasons, Eric quotes his mother for use of politically incorrect or offensive statements. For example, in "Good Times with Weapons", Eric claimed that he and Liane went to see the movie The Passion of the Christ for an argument proving that Jews are sneaky liars.

=== Sexuality and employment ===
Earlier in the series, Liane was sexually active and promiscuous. She occasionally worked as a crack whore, and appeared in "Crack Whore Magazine" in "Pinkeye", for which she was then young and needed money. Liane also acted in German scheisse movies. Then, she had no problems with sexual relations with anybody in the town, whereas invites any stranger to her home. But it was hinted that in "Cartman's Mom is Still a Dirty Slut" that she had intercourse with a few citizens of South Park.

In more recent seasons, Liane attempts to commute from home to a traditional form of employment during daytime hours while also engaging in prostitution as a higher-class "escort" (rather than street-level crack whore) on the side. Eric's constant demands for attention cause Liane to be unable to maintain a normal job, and the family is frequently in a precarious economic state. Even with her two sources of income, Liane still qualifies for government welfare payments, and the family is evicted from their rental home and moves into an abandoned hot dog stand for a period of time.

=== Hermaphrodite and parentage ===
In "Cartman's Mom Is Still a Dirty Slut", Dr. Alphonse Mephesto stated that Liane was a hermaphrodite with both male and female sexual organs. Mephesto also told her son Eric that Liane is not his mother but rather his father. It was also stated that in the events of the episode, years ago at the Drunken Barn Dance, Liane proceeded to have sex with numerous men and women.

Eric later becomes skeptical and confronts Mr. Garrison and Mr. Hat during "200" for the truth of the paternity test results. The next episode, "201" reveals that Liane is not a hermaphrodite, and the citizens of South Park lied in order to protect the Denver Broncos from a scandal. Scott Tenorman captures him and reveals that the former's real father was Scott's father Jack Tenorman, a Broncos player who Cartman had arranged to be killed, eventually made into chili, and fed to Scott.

== Family ==
Liane is the single mother of 10-year-old Eric. She has a kind and soft voice and shows great deference towards him. Like her son, she denies Eric's obesity, and also says he's big-boned; however, it was confirmed in the episode "Fat Camp" that she lied about it all along. Liane likes to give her son odd regular-food-mixed-with-junk-food meal combinations, such as the "chocolate chicken pot pie with icing on top" she gave Eric in "Cartman Gets an Anal Probe". Though Eric and Liane share a strong bond, in later seasons, she responds more sternly to his poor actions; these incidents often resolve in later episodes. During "PC Principal Final Justice", Cartman and Liane argue until the former pulls out a gun, after which the latter also responds in the same way and gets Cartman to listen to her. Liane has also gotten tired of her son misbehaving in recent episodes, from Eric not getting his shot causing her embarrassment to her losing her job as a real estate agent and moving from their original home to Coney Island Hotdog as a result. Liane finally stops giving in to Eric after he tries to give her breast enlargement surgery.

Liane and Eric have an extended family, which was first shown in "Merry Christmas, Charlie Manson!". In that episode Liane, along with her son and his friends Stan, Kyle, and Kenny, are in Nebraska to visit Liane's relatives — most of which are similar to Cartman vis-à-vis speech mannerisms as well as catchphrases such as "Respect Mah Authoritah!" or "Kickass!". Liane's relatives are parents Harold and Mabel (who died prior to Cartmanland), brothers Howard, Stinky and Bob, and grandmother Florence. She also has a sister-in-law named Lisa, two nephews named Elvin and Fred, and a niece named Alexandra. Her family, as well as other members of the Cartman family (who've also appeared in the episode) makes an appearance in the beginning of Cartmanland at Mabel's funeral.

== See also ==
- South Park (Park County, Colorado)
- South Park City
