= Fourth Grade (South Park) =

- South Park episode
- Episode no.: Season 4 Episode 11
- Directed by: Trey Parker
- Written by: Trey Parker
- Original air date: November 8, 2000

Episode chronology
← Previous " Probably"	Next → "Trapper Keeper"
- South Park season 4

"Fourth Grade" is the eleventh episode of the fourth season of the animated television series South Park, and the 59th episode of the series overall. It first aired on November 8, 2000. Written by Trey Parker, "Fourth Grade" focuses on the main characters' transition to the fourth grade, a change that would remain consistent in subsequent seasons. It is the episode in which the character Mr. Garrison, who had been homophobic in his rhetoric during the first few seasons, finally comes to terms with his own homosexuality.

== Plot ==
The episode begins with the boys—Stan, Kyle, Cartman, and Kenny—starting their first day of fourth grade. They quickly realize that their new teacher, Ms. Choksondik, is much stricter than their third-grade teacher, Mr. Garrison. The boys, longing for the carefree days of third grade, devise a plan to travel back in time using Timmy's wheelchair and a crude time machine constructed by two Star Trek fans. The time travel attempt fails, causing Timmy's wheelchair to careen erratically throughout the town of South Park. Ms. Choksondik, disappointed with the students' performance in her class, goes on a quest to find Mr. Garrison. Kenny is sent to attempt to stop Timmy's wheelchair but dies in the process. Choksondik finds Garrison living in a feral manner in the mountains and asks him how to handle his former students. Meanwhile, Timmy has been teleported back in time to the era of dinosaurs. The boys try to have another time machine built, but the two Star Trek fans refuse to talk to each other due to a dispute over how many Star Trek episodes there are.

Garrison sends Choksondik into the "tree of insight", where she does not encounter anything. Garrison then enters the "tree of insight", and comes to terms with his homosexuality. The children, after convincing the Star Trek fans to build another time machine, open a portal and prepare to go back in time. Choksondik tells the children they should not go back in time, and should instead focus on moving forward with their lives. The boys realize they don't want to go back in time to third grade, and blame Cartman for making them nostalgic. Timmy returns through the portal and is reunited with the class.

Garrison announces he is gay to the school staff, who congratulate him for accepting his sexuality, and asks them for his teaching job back. Unfortunately for him, his former coworkers tell Garrison that they do not hire gay people and laughing in his face.

== Production ==
The decision to have the characters age into fourth grade was described by Trey Parker in an interview printed in The Vindicator as "kind of a joke" and "a spoof on how shows like Beverly Hills, 90210 change because the actors get older". When questioned by Michael Saunders and Jim Sullivan of The Boston Globe regarding whether the move to fourth grade heralded a shift in tone for the show, Parker replied that "the show in tone is not any different".

== Reception ==
The critical reception of the episode was mostly positive. Terry Morrow, writing for the Knoxville News Sentinel, opined that there was a "renewed energy" in the show and that it "retains its rebellious spirit". Diane Werts writing for Newsday remarked that "the pieces don't fit together quite as brightly as usual, making the whole somewhat less than the sum of its individually clever parts." Joel Brown of the Boston Herald rated the episode three stars out of four and noted the episode had a "demented kind of uplift".
