= Eliza Schneider =

American actress

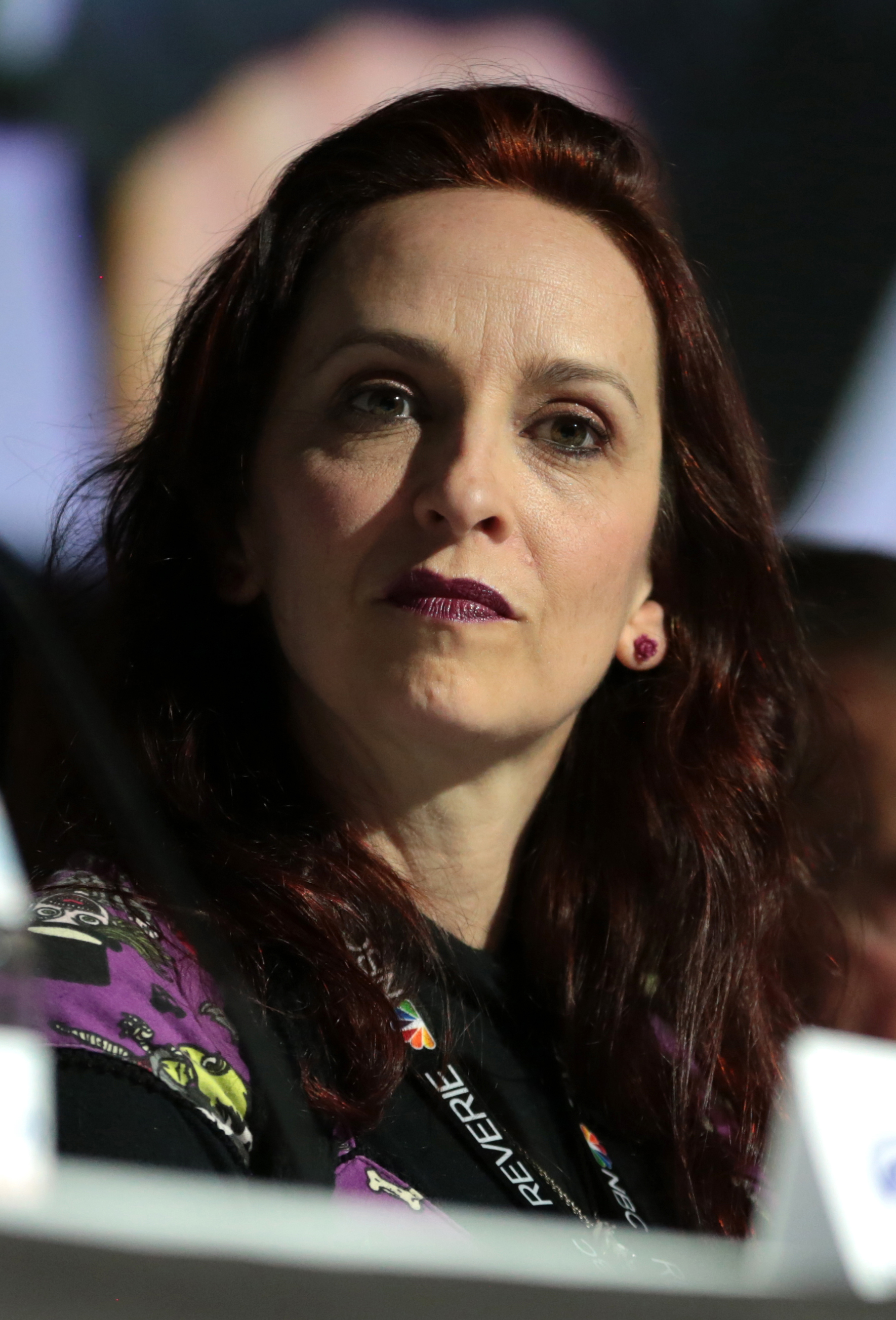
- Schneider at the 2018 WonderCon
- Other name: Blue Girl
- Occupations: Actress, singer, dialectologist, playwright, voice artist, dialect coach
- Years active: 1992–present
- Partner: Roger Ray
- Children: 1
- Website: elizajaneschneidervo.com

Eliza Jane Schneider is an American actress, singer, playwright, dialect coach and dialectologist. She has appeared on television and as a voice over actress on video games and animations. She also performs various musical and stage shows.

== Early life and television work ==
Schneider spent her formative years on a Chippewa reservation in Bemidji, Minnesota with her two older brothers in a mostly Jewish family. Her mother was an attorney for the reservation. She moved to New York at the age of 8. Her father became a math and drama teacher at the School of Arts High School in Rochester, New York, where she graduated as salutatorian. She started playing violin, which she learned from her grandfather, learning the Suzuki method, after seeing L Shenkar. When she was sixteen, she was in her first musical group, IT'S MY PARTY! From ages 7–20, she went to Jewish summer camp, becoming a counselor, and started performing on stage. By the time she was in the fourth grade she began writing and performing her own plays, because the teacher told her that she would only be allowed to stage a play if she "wrote, produced, directed." Four years later she was chosen for a part in Annie; Schneider's parents would not let her tour with the troupe after being cast. She participated in a theater program at Northwestern University's National High School Institute and graduated from UCLA in 1994 as a world arts and cultures major.

While in college she continued going to auditions and got the role of Sheila Brentwood in the television series The Amazing Live Sea Monkeys. For the show she was allowed to cast the actors who played her parents. After the show got canceled, she replaced Alanna Ubach as the assistant and co-host for the second and third seasons of Beakman's World.

== Dialect research and stage shows ==
For her college senior thesis, Schneider made a cross-country road tour in a former ambulance studying regional dialects. During her research into accents, she "visited all the English-speaking countries in the world, conducting more than 7,000 interviews over all." From the interviews she created a one-woman show called Freedom of Speech in which she tells the stories of 34 people in their voices. The various quotes are combined into a story. When interviewed about the shows by Western Washington University newspaper The Western Front, she explained that "People in America today are scared to speak up and tell their perspective on what our nation is or where it is going... I wanted to repeat the peoples' words verbatim so the audience could develop their own perspective." Using a semi-autobiographical approach, Schneider links the quotes and stories together, saying "it's really a love story about a petulant girl who starts out hating America for perpetuating hate. She begins collecting sounds and winds up falling in love with her country." The show won the 2003 New York International Fringe Festival award for "Best Solo Show".

Her ensuing solo show, Words of the Prophets, is composed partially of quotes from "homeless people all over the world."

In 2008, Schneider wrote a play called "Sounds of Silence: A Documentary Puppet Musical Farce" about the 2004 United States election voting controversies in Ohio.

== Music and voiceover work ==
When explaining about her dialect and musical interest she said: "You know how they talk about a photographic memory? That's not actually how my mind works. It's aural. I remember what I hear...when I try to do a piece onstage, I hear the next words [they actually said]. I hear the rest of the monologue. It takes every bit of strength and intellect that I have to control that." In a 2013 interview, she explained that "to me, music, voice, voices of the people, play writing, dialect, language, violin – it all springs from the same well of fascination with sound."

Schneider also provided voice acting on the popular animated comedy South Park. Alongside Mona Marshall, she replaced Mary Kay Bergman in many roles following her death by suicide. In 2003, while Marshall continued to provide voices, Schneider left over the show's producers' refusal to extend her a union contract. She was replaced by April Stewart in 2004. During this time, Schneider was part of Honey Pig, an all-female country music trio.

== Personal life ==
Schneider and her partner, Roger Ray, have a son named Raiden Daniel. Schneider is working as a violin instructor for her son and other children.

In 2012, Schneider joined the cast of Spider Baby the Musical for a San Diego performance, playing the role of Emily Howe.

== Filmography ==
=== Television ===
Year	Title	Role	Notes
1993–1995	Beakman's World	Liza	
1997	Johnny Bravo	Lola (voice)	Episode: "Berry the Butler"
1999–2003	South Park	Various characters (voice)	
2002	The Zeta Project	Jenny (voice)	Episode: "The Wrong Morph"
2002	Girlfriends	Tanya	Episode: "Sister, Sister"
2003	Invader Zim	Moofy (voice)	Episode: "The Girl Who Cried Gnome"
2007	Squirrel Boy	Martha (voice)	2 episodes
2009	Popzilla	Various characters (voice)	
2011	Batman: The Brave and the Bold	Paula von Gunther, Georgette Taylor (voice)	Episode: "The Scorn of the Star Sapphire!"
2015–2016	Sanjay and Craig	Various voices	
2018	Rise of the Teenage Mutant Ninja Turtles	Mrs. Cuddles (voice)	Episode: "Mrs. Cuddles"

=== Film ===
Year	Title	Role	Notes
2003	Finding Nemo	Additional voices	
2012	Foodfight!	Sweet Older Lady (voice)	
2019	Curious George: Royal Monkey	Ana, Fruit Cart Lady (voice)	

=== Video games ===
Year	Title	Role	Notes
2004	The Bard's Tale	Additional voices	
2004	EverQuest II	Additional voices	
2006	Neopets: Petpet Adventures: The Wand of Wishing	Earth Fairy Guardian	
2006	Kingdom Hearts II	Elizabeth Swann	
2006	Pirates of the Caribbean: The Legend of Jack Sparrow	Elizabeth Swann, Nassau Villager	
2006	Saints Row	Stilwater Resident	
2007	Pirates of the Caribbean: At World's End	Elizabeth Swann	
2007	Neverwinter Nights 2: Mask of the Betrayer	Teen, Gnome, Lienna	
2009	Shadow Complex	Claire Duncan	
2009	Assassin's Creed II	Rebecca Crane	
2009	Ratchet & Clank Future: A Crack in Time	Valkyrie	
2010	Dragon Age: Origins	Various voices	
2010	Alice in Wonderland	White Queen, Red Flower, Rosemary	
2010	Blade Kitten	Justice Kreel, Terra-Gin	
2010	Fallout: New Vegas	Female Sorrow	
2010	Assassin's Creed: Brotherhood	Rebecca Crane	
2010	Yogi Bear	Campers	
2010	The Lord of the Rings: Aragorn's Quest	Eowyn	
2010	Epic Mickey	Additional voices	
2011	Captain America: Super Soldier	Hydra Forces	
2011	Call of Juarez: The Cartel	Additional voices	
2011	Assassin's Creed Revelations	Rebecca Crane	
2011	Saints Row: The Third	Additional voices	
2011	Final Fantasy XIII-2	Additional voices	
2012	Kingdoms of Amalur: Reckoning	Windemere Maid	
2012	Diablo III	Additional voices	
2012	Assassin's Creed III	Rebecca Crane	
2013	Sly Cooper: Thieves in Time	Miss Decibel	
2013	The Last of Us	Additional voices	
2013	Saints Row IV	Additional voices	
2013	Grand Theft Auto V	Additional voices	
2013	Infinity Blade III	Additional voices	
2013	Assassin's Creed IV: Black Flag	Rebecca Crane	
2014	Diablo III: Reaper of Souls	Female Necromancer	
2014	Skylanders: Trap Team	Mags, Bat Spin	
2014	Lego Ninjago: Nindroids	Nya	
2015	Final Fantasy Type-0 HD	Arecia Al-Rashia	
2015	Skylanders: SuperChargers	Mags, Bat Spin	
2015	Lego Dimensions	Nya/Samurai X	
2015	Assassin's Creed Syndicate	Rebecca Crane	
2015	Call of Duty: Black Ops III	Additional voices	
2016	Lego Marvel's Avengers	Pepper Potts	
2016	Final Fantasy XV	Additional voices	
2017	Prey	Mikhaila Ilyushin	
2017	LawBreakers	Bomchelle	
2017	Middle-earth: Shadow of War	Humans	
2017	Agents of Mayhem	Agent Rama	
2019	Kingdom Hearts III	Elizabeth Swann	
2020	Assassin's Creed Valhalla	Rebecca Crane	
2023	Disney Speedstorm	Elizabeth Swann	
2023	DreamWorks All-Star Kart Racing	Bridget	
2023	Assassin's Creed Nexus VR	Rebecca Crane	
