= Bike Parade =

- South Park episode
- Episode no.: Season 22; Episode 10
- Directed by: Trey Parker
- Written by: Trey Parker
- Production code: 2210
- Original air date: December 12, 2018

Guest appearance
- Casey Nicholaw as Larry Zewiski

Episode chronology
← Previous "Unfulfilled"	Next → "Mexican Joker"
- South Park season 22

"Bike Parade" is the tenth and final episode of the twenty-second season of the American animated television series South Park. The 297th overall episode of the series, it premiered on Comedy Central in the United States on December 12, 2018. It is the second part of a two-episode story arc that serves as the season finale.

The episode centers upon the new Amazon fulfillment center that has opened in town, where workers have gone on strike, putting delivery of the citizens' Christmas packages in jeopardy. This includes Stan, Kyle and Cartman, whose dreams of winning first prize in the town's bike parade are threatened when their friend, Kenny, eschews commercialism in a sign of solidarity with the striking workers. The episode makes references to events in various episodes of the season.

== Plot ==
Employees of South Park's new Amazon fulfillment go on strike, led by Josh Carter, a former "fulfiller" who was compressed into a small Amazon box. The zombie-like former employees from the South Park Mall have agreed to work at the center as temporary employees. Stan Marsh, Kyle Broflovski, Eric Cartman, and Kenny McCormick are pleased to see that they are finally receiving the items they purchased from Amazon for the town's upcoming bike parade, where they hope to win first prize. Jeff Bezos, who is depicted as an alien Talosian from Star Trek, observes all this through cameras in local Amazon Echo devices. He has Josh kidnapped and tells a group of children that Josh's box holds a bike parade gift, prompting them to rip it open, killing Josh. Mayor McDaniels, who convinced Bezos to open the fulfillment center in South Park, witnesses this and is horrified.

Stuart McCormick is angered that his son Kenny is not boycotting Amazon. Kenny becomes disillusioned with the commercialism in which he has participated, and tells his friends he will not join them in the bike parade, prompting their fear that they cannot win it without him. When the center's manager Stephen Stotch learns of Josh's kidnapping, feels torn between supporting the workers and his family, especially his son, Butters, who is overjoyed to receive a new bike for the parade.

Randy Marsh's cannabis farm, Tegridy Farms, sees an increase in business as the strikers come to him for marijuana to relieve their stress. When he is daunted by competition from other farms, Randy's friend Towelie suggests that they use the e-scooters that began appearing in the episode "The Scoots" so that Tegridy Farms can offer its own delivery to customers.

The boys scheme to force the parade's cancellation. However, when they shop for materials to make signs for their campaign, they discover that the fulfillment center has forced the closure of all of the town's local businesses, for which McDaniels is guilt-ridden. When Santa Claus arrives in town, raising the possibility that he will solve the crisis, but he immediately leaves after learning that his colleague Mr. Hankey was driven out of town for inappropriate tweets (in the episode "The Problem with a Poo"). The despondent boys commiserate over their inability to provoke outrage.

The boys go to City Hall to demand the bike parade's cancellation, but find Bezos sitting at McDaniels' desk. Bezos says that the parade increased local Amazon purchases, leading the townsfolk to take jobs at the fulfillment center. He orders his Amazon Echo to kill Kenny, whose activism is a threat to Bezos. The town's citizens show up at City Hall, where Randy tells Bezos that they now have "Tegridy", have quit the fulfillment center, and are expelling Bezos and his fellow executives from South Park. The bike parade goes on as planned, with Cartman pulling Kenny's coffin on his bike, as the town returns to normal.

== Critical reception ==
Jesse Schedeen, reviewing the episode for IGN, gave it an "Okay" rating of 6.9 out of 10. Schedeen was surprised at the number of continuity references to previous episodes in the season, as such conceits tend to be few and far between on South Park. Though Schedeen questioned the wisdom of this, believing that it provided for an unfocused and anticlimactic narrative, he also believed that it lent itself to a number of hilarious moments, including the Santa Claus cameo, Butters' pride in his new bike, and the use of the Amazon Echo device to create another entry in the recurring but not recently seen gag of Kenny's deaths. Schedeen also praised Randy's collaboration with Towelie and his leadership of the town uprising. He took issue, however, with the episode's metafictional elements, believing they did not work as well as in the episodes "You're Getting Old"/"Ass Burgers" two-parter.

Dani Di Placido, writing for Forbes, called the episode "an insightful, tremendously clever episode", and "a fantastic end to a very strong season," which Di Placido observed focused more on general societal trends over episodic controversies. Di Placido lauded the episode's depiction of Santa Claus' reaction to Mr. Hankey's banishment as a commentary on how real-world outrage culture has evolved since the series premiered; how modern technology has reduced individual privacy, and how the boys' metafictional conversation on the bridge served as Trey Parker and Matt Stone's thoughts on South Park's longevity. He also noted the revelation of Ned Gerblansky's survival following the events of "Time to Get Cereal", and its treatment of President Donald Trump via the shot of Herbert Garrison in handcuffs.

John Hugar of The A.V. Club gave the episode a "B+", calling it an example of how the series has shown itself capable of using the season finale to tie together seemingly unrelated storylines, including ostensibly abandoned ones since it began employing serialized story arcs in Season 18. Hugar also enjoyed many of the gags, and called the scene in which Bezos' former employees are shown looking the wrong way when confronting him "probably the hardest belly laugh of the season." He also singled out Butters' peacocking with his bike. Thematically, Hugar felt that "Bike Parade" improved upon the episode "Buddha Box" with a more realistic portrayal of the effects of anxiety. Hugar also enjoyed Parker and Stone's use of mass drug use in yet another episode on anti-corporatism, and their ideas on the best way to address the worst excesses of modern capitalism.

== See also ==
- Something Wall-Mart This Way Comes, a similar premise from Season 8 involving Wall-Mart.
