= Cancel culture =

Modern form of social rejection

Cancel culture, also called call-out culture, is a cultural and political term that describes the phenomenon in which people criticize an individual they believe to have acted or spoken in an unacceptable manner, and publicly call (often over social media) for the target to be ostracized, boycotted, shunned or fired. This shunning may extend to social or professional circles— whether on social media or in person— with most high-profile incidents involving those with influence in media or politics.

Such subjects are said to have been "canceled". (Note: Merriam-Webster notes that to "cancel", in this context, means "to stop giving support to that person". Dictionary.com, in its pop-culture dictionary, defines cancel culture as "withdrawing support for (canceling) public figures and companies after they have done or said something considered objectionable or offensive.") While the careers of some public figures have been impacted by boycotts— widely described as "cancellation"— others who have complained of cancellation successfully continued their careers.

The term "cancel culture" came into circulation in 2018 and has mostly negative connotations. Some critics argue that cancel culture has a chilling effect on public discourse, that it is unproductive, that it does not bring real social change, that it causes intolerance, that it amounts to cyberbullying, or that it contributes to political polarization.

== Origins ==
Early examples of cancel culture include the conservative campaigns against Hustler magazine and the television show Teletubbies and the backlash received by the Dixie Chicks for their opposition to the Iraq War.

The 1981 Chic album Take It Off includes the song "Your Love Is Cancelled", which compares a breakup to the cancellation of TV shows. The song was written by Nile Rodgers following a bad date Rodgers had with a woman who expected him to misuse his celebrity status on her behalf. "Your Love Is Cancelled" inspired screenwriter Barry Michael Cooper to include a reference to a woman being canceled in the 1991 film New Jack City. This usage introduced the term to African-American Vernacular English, where it became more common.

By 2015, the concept of canceling had become widespread on Black Twitter to refer to a personal decision, sometimes seriously and sometimes in jest, to stop supporting a person or work. According to Jonah Engel Bromwich of The New York Times, this usage of the word "cancellation" indicates "total disinvestment in something (anything)". After numerous cases of online shaming gained wide notoriety, the use of the term "cancellation" increased to describe a widespread, outraged, online response to a single provocative statement, against a single target. Over time, as isolated instances of cancellation became more frequent and the mob mentality more apparent, commentators began seeing a "culture" of outrage and cancellation.

In October 2017, sexual assault allegations against film producer Harvey Weinstein led to the cancellation of his projects, his expulsion from the Academy of Motion Picture Arts and Sciences, and legal consequences, including a conviction on charges of rape and sexual assault. These events contributed to the rise of the #MeToo movement, where individuals shared their own allegations of sexual assault, leading to the cancellation of the careers of those accused. In November 2017, comedian Louis C.K. admitted to sexual misconduct allegations and, as a result, his shows were canceled, distribution deals were terminated, and he was dropped by his agency and management. After a period away from show business, Louis C.K. returned to work in 2018 and won a Grammy award in 2022. However, many people in the entertainment industry said that it was inappropriate to support his career or award him a Grammy due to his past misconduct.

Google searches for the phrase "cancel culture" accelerated in 2020, while searches including broader equivalent terms accelerated in 2021.

Conversations about "cancel culture" increased in late 2019. In the 2020s, the phrase became a shorthand nom de guerre employed by spectators to refer to what they perceived to be disproportionate reactions to politically incorrect speech. In 2020, Ligaya Mishan wrote in The New York Times: "The term is shambolically applied to incidents both online and off that range from vigilante justice to hostile debate to stalking, intimidation and harassment. [...] Those who embrace the idea (if not the precise language) of canceling seek more than pat apologies and retractions, although it's not always clear whether the goal is to right a specific wrong or redress a larger imbalance of power." "Call-out culture" has been in use as part of the #MeToo movement. The #MeToo movement encouraged women and men to call out their abusers on a forum where the accusations would be heard, especially against very powerful individuals.

== Academic and legal perspectives ==
=== Definition ===
Former U.S. Secretary of Labor Eugene Scalia wrote in a 2021 Harvard Journal of Law and Public Policy article that cancel culture is a form of free speech, and is therefore protected under the First Amendment to the U.S. Constitution. Media studies scholar Eve Ng defines cancel culture as "the withdrawal of any kind of support (viewership, social media follows, purchases of products endorsed by the person, etc.) for those who are assessed to have said or done something unacceptable or highly problematic, generally from a social justice perspective especially alert to sexism, heterosexism, homophobia, racism, bullying, and related issues."

Ng also described cancel culture as "a collective of typically marginalized voices 'calling out' and emphatically expressing their censure of a powerful figure". According to Lisa Nakamura, University of Michigan professor of media studies, canceling someone is a form of "cultural boycott" and cancel culture is the "ultimate expression of agency", which is "born of a desire for control [as] people have limited power over what is presented to them on social media" and a need for "accountability which is not centralized".

=== Punishment ===
There are different perspectives on the morality of cancellations. On one hand, there is the view that cancel culture imposes punishments that are not proportional to the offenses or alleged offenses. This is closely related to John Stuart Mill's criticism of public shaming. In On Liberty, Mill argued that society "practises a social tyranny more formidable than many kinds of political oppression, since, though not usually upheld by such extreme penalties, it leaves fewer means of escape, penetrating much more deeply into the details of life, and enslaving the soul itself." Martha Nussbaum similarly says that cancel culture represents the "justice of the mob", but this alleged justice is not "deliberative, impartial or neutral."

On the other hand, there are those who defend the value of shaming as constructive, if done right. People who defend this view maintain that cancel culture often shames people counter-productively but that it can be tweaked or altered in order to be a valuable tool for people's improvement. For instance, holding people accountable for things that they have done wrong can be a powerful way of correcting bad behavior, but it has to be paired with a belief in the possibility of redemption. People who take this approach often agree with Plato that shame is an important feeling that can lead to moral improvements. Everyone in this debate agrees that it is important to avoid what Nussbaum calls a "spoiled identity": to have a spoiled identity is to have the public image of someone who is irredeemable and unwelcome in a community.

In 2023, American conservatives and anti-trans activists engaged in a boycott of Bud Light over its hiring of transgender TikTok personality Dylan Mulvaney. The incident is seen an example of cancel culture and consumer backlash. The Harvard Business Review cited the incident as an example of an attempt to "resonate with younger, more socially-conscious audiences", but that it "generated downstream adjustments from retailers and distributors" that negatively hurt the product's performance. It highlighted the incident as making consumer brand marketing departments fearful of taking a stand on social issues.

=== Academic criticisms ===
Harvard University professor Pippa Norris has stated that the controversies surrounding cancel culture are between those who argue it gives a voice to those in marginalized communities and those who argue that cancel culture is dangerous because it prevents free speech and/or the opportunity for open debate. Norris emphasizes the role of social media in contributing to the rise of cancel culture. Additionally, online communications studies have demonstrated the intensification of cultural wars through activists that are connected through digital and social networking sites. Norris also mentions that the spiral of silence theory may contribute to why people are hesitant to voice their minority views on social media sites and fear that their views and opinions, specifically political opinions, will be chastised because their views violate the majority group's norms and understanding.

In the book The Coddling of the American Mind (2018), social psychologist Jonathan Haidt and Greg Lukianoff, president of the Foundation for Individual Rights and Expression, argue that call-out culture arises on college campuses from what they term "safetyism"—a moral culture in which people are unwilling to make tradeoffs demanded by the practical or moral concerns of others. Cultural studies scholar Frances E. Lee states that call-out culture leads to self-policing of "wrong, oppressive, or inappropriate" opinions. Keith Hampton, professor of media studies at Michigan State University, contends that the practice contributes to political polarization in the United States but does not lead to changes in opinion. According to Eugene Scalia, cancel culture can interfere with the right to counsel, since some lawyers would not be willing to risk their personal and professional reputation on controversial topics.

=== Alternatives ===
Some academics have proposed alternatives and improvements to cancel culture. Clinical counsellor Anna Richards, who specializes in conflict mediation, has stated that "learning to analyze our own motivations when offering criticism" helps call-out culture work productively. Professor Joshua Knobe, of the Philosophy Department at Yale, contends that public denunciation is not effective, and that society is too quick to pass judgement against those they view as public offenders or personae non gratae. Knobe says that these actions have the opposite effect on individuals, and that it is best to bring attention to the positive actions in which most of society participates.

== Usage by the political right ==
Activists on the right have also attempted to and sometimes succeeded in canceling various people.

Historian Nicole Hemmer finds historical "cancel culture" on the right before the term was coined, in various movements. McCarthyism and the Lavender Scare of the 1940s and 1950s aimed to get people suspected of communist sympathies or homosexuality fired from their government or private-sector jobs, including the entertainment industry through the Hollywood blacklist. The Save Our Children campaign in the late 1970s was a movement to make discrimination on the basis of sexual orientation legal, and ban gay and lesbian people from school employment. Conservatives angry at various comments were able to secure the cancellation of Bill Maher's show Politically Incorrect, and the resignation of Van Jones and Shirley Sherrod from the Obama Administration. Attempts to ban LGBTQ-related books (e.g. Heather Has Two Mommies, And Tango Makes Three) in the 1990s and 2000s have continued in the 2020s with groups like Moms for Liberty.

The right has also been criticized for supporting cancel culture in regards to Israel and Palestine. For example, during the Gaza war, Republicans held Congress hearings in which they accused university leaders of not doing enough to silence what they perceived as antisemitic speech on campus. In another example, New York University withheld the diploma of graduating senior Logan Rozos, in retaliation for his criticism of US support for the genocide in Gaza during a graduation speech. Some activists who present themselves as defenders of free speech engage in cancel culture directed at pro-Palestine activists, also known as the Palestine exception to free speech. Other critics of cancel culture have also supported book bans in school and public libraries or censorship of school curriculums.

In the aftermath of the assassination of Charlie Kirk, some conservatives who had previously criticized cancel culture pushed for the firing of people who criticized Kirk after his death. Vice President JD Vance called on Americans to report those allegedly celebrating Kirk's killing to their employers and promised to use the federal government to investigate and punish liberal organizations and donors. Adam Goldstein of the Foundation for Individual Rights and Expression described the shift as a form of right-wing cancel culture, noting that people were being targeted for simply quoting Kirk or failing to mourn his passing adequately, comparing government involvement to McCarthyism. The New York Times described the campaign as morphing into "a conservative version of the cancel culture that only a few years ago was wielded by the American left", and evidence of the rise of a "woke right". Some conservative voices also objected to the Trump administration's efforts to police speech surrounding Kirk's death, with The Wall Street Journal running an editorial saying: "The squeeze on Disney looks to be a case of cancel culture on the right."

== Reactions ==
The expression "cancel culture" has mostly negative connotations and is used in debates on free speech and censorship.

=== Criticism ===
In a speech at the Obama Foundation's annual summit in 2019, former U.S. President Barack Obama criticized the role of "call-out culture" and "wokeness" among young activists on social media. U.S. President Donald Trump criticized "cancel culture" in a speech in July 2020, comparing it to totalitarianism and saying that it is a political weapon used to punish and shame dissenters by driving them from their jobs and demanding submission. He was subsequently criticized as being hypocritical for having attempted to cancel a number of people and companies in the past himself. Trump made similar claims during the 2020 Republican National Convention when he stated that the goal of cancel culture is to make decent Americans live in fear of being fired, expelled, shamed, humiliated, and driven from society.

Pope Francis said that cancel culture is "a form of ideological colonization, one that leaves no room for freedom of expression", saying that it "ends up cancelling all sense of identity". Patrisse Khan-Cullors, the co-founder of the Black Lives Matter movement, states that social activism does not just involve going online or going to a protest to call someone out, but is work entailing strategy sessions, meetings, and getting petitions signed. British prime minister Rishi Sunak included cancel culture, where one group "are trying to impose their views on the rest of us", among the contemporary dangers of the modern world.

Philosopher Slavoj Žižek states that "cancel culture, with its implicit paranoia, is a desperate and obviously self-defeating attempt to compensate for the very real violence and intolerance that sexual minorities have long suffered. But it is a retreat into a cultural fortress, a pseudo-'safe space' whose discursive fanaticism merely strengthens the majority's resistance to it." Lisa Nakamura, a professor at the University of Michigan, describes cancel culture as "a cultural boycott" and says it provides a culture of accountability. Meredith Clark, an assistant professor at the University of Virginia, states that cancel culture gives power to disenfranchised voices. Osita Nwanevu, a staff writer for The New Republic, states that people are threatened by cancel culture because it is a new group of young progressives, minorities, and women who have "obtained a seat at the table" and are debating matters of justice and etiquette.

=== Open letter ===
Dalvin Brown, writing in USA Today, has described an open letter signed by 153 public figures and published in Harper's Magazine as marking a "high point" in the debate on the topic. The letter set out arguments against "an intolerance of opposing views, a vogue for public shaming and ostracism, and the tendency to dissolve complex policy issues in a blinding moral certainty". A response letter, "A More Specific Letter on Justice and Open Debate", was signed by over 160 people in academia and media. It criticized the Harper's letter as a plea to end cancel culture by successful professionals with large platforms who wanted to exclude others who have been "canceled for generations". The writers ultimately stated that the Harper's letter was intended to further silence already marginalized people. They wrote: "It reads as a caustic reaction to a diversifying industry—one that's starting to challenge diversifying norms that have protected bigotry."

=== American public opinion ===
A survey conducted in September 2020 on 10,000 Americans by Pew Research Center asked a series of different questions in regard to cancel culture, specifically on who has heard of the term cancel culture and how Americans define cancel culture. At that time, 44% of Americans said that they have at least heard a fair amount about the new phrase, while 22% have heard a great deal and 32% said they have heard nothing at all. 43% Americans aged 18–29 have heard a great deal about cancel culture, compared to only 12% of Americans over the age of 65 who say they have heard a great deal. Additionally, within that same study, the 44% of Americans who had heard a great deal about cancel culture, were then asked how they defined cancel culture. 49% of those Americans state that it describes actions people take to hold others accountable, 14% describe cancel culture as censorship of speech or history, and 12% define it as mean-spirited actions taken to cause others harm. It was found that men were more likely to have heard or know of cancel culture, and that those who identify with the Democratic Party (46%) are no more likely to know the term than those in the Republican Party (44%).

A poll of American registered voters conducted by Morning Consult in July 2020 showed that cancel culture, defined as "the practice of withdrawing support for (or canceling) public figures and companies after they have done or said something considered objectionable or offensive", was common: 40% of respondents said they had withdrawn support from public figures and companies, including on social media, because they had done or said something considered objectionable or offensive, with 8% having engaged in this often. Behavior differed according to age, with a majority (55%) of voters 18 to 34 years old saying they have taken part in cancel culture, while only about a third (32%) of voters over 65 said they had joined a social media pile-on. Attitude towards the practice was mixed, with 44% of respondents saying they disapproved of cancel culture, 32% who approved, and 24% who did not know or had no opinion. Furthermore, 46% believed cancel culture had gone too far, with only 10% thinking it had not gone far enough. Additionally, 53% believed that people should expect social consequences for expressing unpopular opinions in public, such as those that may be construed as deeply offensive to other people.

A March 2021 poll by Harvard University's Center for American Political Studies and the Harris Poll found that 64% of respondents viewed "a growing cancel culture" as a threat to their freedom, while the other 36% did not. 36% of respondents said that cancel culture is a big problem, 32% called it a moderate problem, 20% called it a small problem, and 13% said it is not a problem. 54% said they were concerned that if they expressed their opinions online, they would be banned or fired, while the other 46% said they were not concerned. A November 2021 Hill/HarrisX poll found that 71% of registered voters strongly or somewhat felt that cancel culture went too far, with similar numbers of Republicans (76%), Democrats (70%), and independents (68%) saying so. The same poll found that 69% of registered voters felt that cancel culture unfairly punishes people for their past actions or statements, compared to 31% who said it did not. Republicans were more likely to agree with the statement (79%), compared to Democrats (65%) and independents (64%).

In a January 2022 Knight-Ipsos study involving 4,000 participants, most Americans surveyed said that some speech should be prohibited. Specifically, they stated that "a variety of private and public institutions should prohibit racist speech". However, most also noted that these same institutions should not ban political views that are offensive. A March 2022 New York Times/Siena College survey of 1,000 Americans found that 84 percent of adults said it is a "very serious" or "somewhat serious" problem that some Americans do not speak freely in everyday situations because of fear of retaliation or harsh criticism. The survey also found that 46 percent of respondents said they felt less free to talk about politics compared to a decade ago, and that only 34 percent of Americans said they believed that all Americans enjoyed freedom of speech completely.

== Criticism of "cancel culture" as a concept ==
A number of professors, politicians, journalists, as well as other citizens and activists have questioned the validity of cancel culture as an actual phenomenon. Connor Garel, writing for Vice, states that cancel culture "rarely has any tangible or meaningful effect on the lives and comfortability of the cancelled". Danielle Kurtzleben, a political reporter for NPR, wrote in 2021 that overuse of the phrase "cancel culture" in American politics, particularly by Republicans, has made it "arguably background noise". Per Kurtzleben and others, the term has undergone semantic bleaching to lose its original meaning.

Historian C. J. Coventry argues that the term is incorrectly applied, and that the label has been used to avoid accountability for historical instances of injustice. (Note: "While I agree that the line between debate and suppression is one that occasionally gets crossed by the so-called left wing, it is almost invariably true that the real cancel culture is perpetrated by those who have embraced the term. If you look through Australian history, as well as European and American history, you will find countless examples of people speaking out against injustice and being persecuted in return. I can think of a number of people in our own time who are being persecuted by supposedly democratic governments for revealing uncomfortable information.") Another historian, David Olusoga, made a similar argument, and argued that the phenomenon of cancellation is not limited to the left. (Note: "Unlike some on the left, I have never doubted that 'cancel culture' exists ... The great myth about cancel culture, however, is that it exists only on the left. For the past 40 years, rightwing newspapers have ceaselessly fought to delegitimize and ultimately cancel our national broadcaster [the BBC], motivated by financial as well as political ambitions.") Indigenous governance professor and activist Pamela Palmater writes in Maclean's magazine that "cancel culture is the dog whistle term used by those in power who don't want to be held accountable for their words and actions—often related to racism, misogyny, homophobia or the abuse and exploitation of others."

Sarah Manavis wrote for the New Statesman magazine, "For the better part of the last decade, we have given a label to something that has existed for the length of human history. Some might call it criticism, others might call it backlash." Additionally, she observed that many opponents of so-called cancel culture had drawn upon the arguments of Jon Ronson's book, So You've Been Publicly Shamed. However, noting that Ronson himself remarked that the term cancel culture is "not useful at all" since it "encompass[es] wildly different people and situations", Manavis wrote that "Ronson himself believes that the 'public shaming of civilians' which Ronson wrote of in his book 'doesn't apply' to the social phenomena labelled as cancel culture." To Manavis, the public shaming of "non-famous people" is not essentially about lack of "free speech", but about "how little power normal people have". To Manavis, "[s]ocial media can be intimidating when you have thousands of people disagreeing with you," but the "right to free speech is not the right to have your unfiltered thoughts published without critique. It’s likely [that,] if you feel this way, you hold more power than most of the world."

=== Consequence culture ===
Some media commentators including LeVar Burton and Sunny Hostin have stated that "cancel culture" should be renamed "consequence culture". The terms have different connotations: "cancel culture" focusing on the effect whereby discussion is limited by a desire to maintain one certain viewpoint, whereas "consequence culture" focuses on the idea that those who write or publish opinions or make statements should bear some responsibility for the effects of these on people.

== In popular media ==
- The 1992 play and 1994 film Oleanna by David Mamet. The plot concerns a power struggle between a college professor and a younger female student, who is backed by an offscreen campus feminist group. The situation escalates to an accusation of sexual harassment and the professor facing the loss of his job. The play and film predate the terms "call out" or "cancel culture" by several decades, but are situated in terms of then-current concerns about political correctness.
- The American animated television series South Park mocked cancel culture with its own "#CancelSouthPark" campaign; in promotion of the show's twenty-second season (2018). In the season's third episode, "The Problem with a Poo", there are references to the 2017 documentary The Problem with Apu, the cancellation of Roseanne after a controversial tweet by Roseanne Barr, and the Brett Kavanaugh Supreme Court nomination.
- In 2019, cancel culture was a primary theme in the stand-up comedy show Sticks & Stones by Dave Chappelle.
- The 2022 film Texas Chainsaw Massacre satirizes cancel culture, with Leatherface killing an individual who threatens to cancel him.
- The 2022 film Tár was interpreted by several critics as exploring themes regarding cancel culture.
- The 2023 film Dream Scenario criticizes cancel culture. The film's creator, Kristoffer Borgli, stated that he conceived the screenplay after reading about university educators who were fired for expressing personal opinions.
- The 2025 film After the Hunt takes on the theme of cancel culture in an academic setting. The plot presents characters on both sides of the cancellation scenario as engaging in a power struggle within the academic hierarchy and includes a counter-narrative suggesting that one of the cancelled individuals is in fact guilty of the behavior he is accused of.

== See also ==
- Blacklisting – Practice of prohibiting people or entities
- Boycott – Voluntary abstention from using a product or service
- Character assassination – Deliberate effort to damage an individual's reputation or credibility
- Culture war – Conflict between cultural values
- Damnatio memoriae – Exclusion of a person from official records and accounts
- Deplatforming – Denying access to a platform to express opinions
- Hate speech – Speech that expresses hatred towards individuals or groups
- Milkshake duck – Internet meme
- Moral entrepreneur – Someone interested in changing social norms
- Moral panic – Fear that some evil threatens society
- Name and shame – Form of dishonoring or disgracing a group or person
- Reactionary – Political view advocating return to a previous societal state
- Scandal – Action regarded as morally or legally wrong and causing public outrage
- Send to Coventry – Deliberately ostracise someone (English idiom)
- Social exclusion – Form of social disadvantage and relegation to the fringe of society
- Social isolation – Lack of contact between an individual and society (Isolation to facilitate abuse)
- Social justice warrior – Pejorative term for a socially progressive person
- Witch-hunt – Search for witchcraft or subversive activity
