= Chivalry: Medieval Warfare =

2012 video game

- Developer: Torn Banner Studios (Note: Ported to PlayStation 3 and Xbox 360 by Mercenary Technology, ported to PlayStation 4 and Xbox One by Hardsuit Labs)
- Publishers: Torn Banner Studios; Activision (consoles)
- Director: Steve Piggott
- Producer: Steve Piggott
- Designers: Justin Pappas; Steve Piggott; Andrew Seyko
- Programmer: Michael Bao
- Artists: Tyler Brenot; Lucas Annunziata; Richard Yang; Rickard Drakborn; Yan Le Gall
- Composer: Ryan Patrick Buckley
- Engine: Unreal Engine 3
- Platforms: Windows; Xbox 360; PlayStation 3; OS X; Linux; PlayStation 4; Xbox One
- Release: October 16, 2012: Windows; October 16, 2012; Xbox 360; December 3, 2014; PlayStation 3; February 10, 2015; OS X, Linux; February 25, 2015; PlayStation 4, Xbox One; December 1, 2015
- Genre: Hack and slash
- Mode: Multiplayer

Chivalry: Medieval Warfare is a multiplayer-focused hack and slash video game developed by Torn Banner Studios and published by Activision as their first commercial title. It was released on October 16, 2012, for Windows. The game is set in a fictional setting. The developers had confirmed that the game would be PC exclusive initially, but in October 2014, they confirmed that the game would be coming to PlayStation 3 and Xbox 360 in December 2014.

The game received generally positive reviews upon release. A standalone expansion pack called Chivalry: Deadliest Warrior was released on November 14, 2013, as a tie-in for the television series Deadliest Warrior. A sequel, Chivalry 2, was released in 2021.

== Gameplay ==
Chivalry: Medieval Warfare has improved graphics (bottom) over the original Age of Chivalry (top). In both shots, a player uses his sword to guard from an attacker.

Chivalry has similar gameplay mechanics to Age of Chivalry, a Half-Life 2 mod created by some same developers. Combat is primarily melee, carried out from either a first person or third-person perspective using medieval implements of war: swords, maces, longbows, and other weaponry of the time are used to hack, smash, and rain arrows down upon enemies. The game also features ballistae, catapults, and boiling oil to use on enemies and their fortifications. Online matches are affected through objective-based gameplay, such as breaching a castle gate with a battering ram or looting a foe's camp. While the game does not have a single-player campaign, there are plans to create an offline mode in the future.

In the game, the fictional nation of Agatha is in a civil war, with two factions – the Agatha Knights and the Mason Order – vying for control of the region. Players pick their sides and choose from four character classes, each with a different set of skills and choice of weaponry.

The game also features large amounts of exaggerated gore.

=== Game modes ===
Chivalry: Medieval Warfare features a number of game modes. The main game modes are:

Free For All: Every player fights only for themselves. The player with most score when the time runs out is declared the winner.

Duel: Players fight in a tournament and compete in 1v1 matches. When the player is dueling with another player, the other players are having their own duels at the same time. The player who has the most victories in the end wins.

Team Deathmatch: Two teams fight against each. Both teams have the same amount of resources at the beginning of a game. The game ends when either team runs out of their resources and their remaining players on the battlefield are killed.

Last Team Standing: Two teams fight in an arena and each player has only one life. The arena features environmental hazards like wall spikes and fire towers. The team with players still alive at the end wins a round.

King of the Hill: Two teams try to hold an area in the middle of the map. First team to hold the area for a certain amount of time wins.

Capture the Flag: Both teams have to capture a flag from enemy base and bring it back to their base, while defending their own flag. First team to reach 3 captures wins.

Team Objective: Players play in either the attacking team or defending team. The attacking team must complete various objectives like pillaging a village, pushing a battering ram to the enemy gates and killing the king while the defending team must stop them.

=== Classes ===
Player can choose one of four playable classes. The four classes are the same for both Agatha Knights and Mason Order, the only difference being the color and style of their armor.

Archer: Archers use weapons like bows and javelins to attack from afar. Archers also have shortswords or daggers for close combat. Archers have barely any armor and should only draw their blades when necessary.

Man-at-Arms: Men-at-Arms are the most nimble of all classes. They use one-handed weapons, like swords and maces, and are equipped with a shield for more effective blocking. Their armor is not as good as other melee classes, but they can make use of their speed to their advantage, as they are fast and can perform dodges.

Vanguard: Vanguards use long weapons, like polearms and greatswords, and prefer to stay a bit farther from the enemy. After sprinting for a while, they can perform a deadly sprint attack that does massive damage and heavily puts the enemy off balance if the attack is blocked. Vanguards have a drawback in which they cannot use shields, unlike other classes.

Knight: Knights are the heaviest of all classes. They use large, two-handed weapons, such as the longsword and battleaxe. They can also use bigger shields than the other classes. Sacrificing speed for armor, they are the slowest class in the game, as they move very slowly and their attacks leave them open for longer periods of time than other classes. The unique skill of the Knight allows him to wield a main sword (but not the axes or hammers) in a single hand, use a shield, or increase his speed at the expense of base damage.

=== Primary Weapons ===
The four different classes use weapons mostly faithful to their medieval counterparts.

Archer: Archers use ranged weaponry like longbows, short bows, war bows, crossbows, light crossbows, heavy crossbows, javelins, short spears, heavy javelins, and slings.

Man-at-Arms: The light and nimble Man-at-Arms uses one-handed weaponry such as broadswords, Norse swords, falchions, hatchets, war axes, Dane axes, flanged axes, morning stars, quarter staffs, and holy water sprinklers.

Vanguard: Vanguards use two-handed weapons with a long reach, which include greatswords, claymores, zweihänders, thrusting spears, forks, brandistocks, bardiches, billhooks, halberds, and pole hammers.

Knight: The heaviest class in the game uses strong and heavy weapons which hit slow and hard, e.g. flails, broadswords, war hammers, throwing axes, and war axes.

== Development ==
The game is based on the free Age of Chivalry mod for Half-Life 2. The developers revamped the combat system from the mod, making changes to both melee and ranged combat. Chivalry also features interactive environments and a "more intuitive" movement system, as well as new graphics and animations. The original mod was created using Half-Life 2's Source game engine, whereas Chivalry was developed with Unreal Engine. The game was first announced under the title Chivalry: Battle For Agatha on May 20, 2010, but has since changed its name to the current title. On September 15, 2012, Chivalry was successfully funded on Kickstarter.

== Reception ==
=== Critical reception ===
Reception

Aggregate score
Aggregator	Score
Metacritic	PC: 79/100; PS4: 58/100; XONE: 51/100

Review scores
Publication	Score
Destructoid	8.5/10
Eurogamer	8/10
GameTrailers	8.6/10
IGN	7.9/10
AusGamers	9/10

The game received generally favorable reviews with a Metacritic score of 79/100 based on 24 different critics. IGN gave it a 7.9/10, praising its medieval style ultra-violent multiplayer gameplay, but also mentioned that the game had a limited number of classes. AusGamers gave the game a 90/100 noting that the game's only downfalls were the lack of different environments and a few bugs. PC Gamer rated the game 81/100 noting "Chivalry is Quake to War of the Roses' Battlefield, and those seeking a faster-paced bloodier experience will undoubtedly prefer Chivalry's type of steel."

=== Sales ===
In August 2013 it was announced that the game has sold 1.2 million copies. As of October 2014, the game has sold 2 million copies.

== Sequel ==
A sequel, Chivalry 2, was announced on June 10, 2019 and was released on June 8, 2021. It was released on PC, PlayStation 4, PlayStation 5, Xbox One, and Xbox Series X/S, with cross-platform play supported on all platforms.

== See also ==
- List of video games derived from modifications
