= Red Dead Redemption 2 =

2018 video game

- Developer: Rockstar Games
- Publisher: Rockstar Games
- Producer: Rob Nelson
- Designer: Imran Sarwar
- Programmer: Phil Hooker
- Artist: Aaron Garbut
- Writers: Dan Houser; Michael Unsworth; Rupert Humphries
- Composer: Woody Jackson
- Series: Red Dead
- Engine: RAGE
- Platforms: PlayStation 4; Xbox One; Windows; Stadia
- Release: PlayStation 4, Xbox One; October 26, 2018; Windows; November 5, 2019; Stadia; November 19, 2019
- Genre: Action-adventure
- Modes: Single-player, multiplayer

Red Dead Redemption 2 is a 2018 action-adventure game developed and published by Rockstar Games. The game is the third entry in the Red Dead series and a prequel to the 2010 game Red Dead Redemption. The story is set in a fictionalized representation of the United States in 1899 and follows the exploits of Arthur Morgan, an outlaw and member of the Van der Linde gang, who must face the challenges of a declining Wild West, while attempting to survive against government forces, rival gangs, and other adversaries. The game is presented through first- and third-person perspectives, and the player may freely roam its interactive open world. Gameplay elements include shootouts, robberies, hunting, horseback riding, interacting with non-player characters, and maintaining the character's honor rating through moral choices and deeds. A bounty system governs the response of law enforcement and bounty hunters to crimes committed by the player.

The game's development lasted over eight years, beginning soon after Red Dead Redemption's release, and it became one of the most expensive video games ever made. Rockstar co-opted all of its studios into one large team to facilitate development. They drew influence from real locations as opposed to film or art, focused on creating an accurate reflection of the time with the game's characters and world. The game was Rockstar's first built specifically for eighth-generation consoles, having tested their technical capabilities while porting Grand Theft Auto V. The game's soundtrack features an original score composed by Woody Jackson and several vocal tracks produced by Daniel Lanois. Development included a crunch schedule of 100-hour weeks, leading to reports of mandatory and unpaid overtime. Red Dead Online, the game's online multiplayer mode, lets up to 32 players engage in a variety of cooperative and competitive game modes.

Red Dead Redemption 2 was released for the PlayStation 4 and Xbox One in October 2018, and for Windows and Stadia in November 2019. It broke several records and had the second-biggest launch in the history of entertainment, generating US$725 million in sales from its opening weekend and exceeding the lifetime sales of Red Dead Redemption within eight days. The game received critical acclaim, with praise directed at its story, characters, open world, graphics, music, and level of detail, but some criticism at its control scheme and emphasis on realism over player freedom. It won more than 175 Game of the Year awards and received multiple other accolades from awards shows and gaming publications. It is considered one of eighth-generation console gaming's most significant releases and among the greatest video games ever made. It is the fourth-best-selling video game with over 89 million copies shipped.

== Gameplay ==
The player may choose to respond positively or negatively to non-player characters throughout the game world, which affects their reputation within the game.

Red Dead Redemption 2 is a Western-themed action-adventure game. Played from a first- or third-person perspective, the game is set in an open-world environment featuring a fictionalized version of the United States in 1899. (Note: The epilogue takes place in 1907.) It features single-player and online multiplayer components, the latter released under Red Dead Online. For most of the game, the player controls outlaw Arthur Morgan, a member of the Van der Linde gang, as he completes missions—linear scenarios with set objectives—to progress the story; from the epilogue, the player controls Red Dead Redemption protagonist John Marston. Outside of missions, they can freely roam the interactive world. They may engage in combat with enemies using melee attacks, firearms, bow and arrow, throwables, or dynamite, and can dual wield weapons. The player can swim as Arthur but not as John. (Note: The inability to swim as John is a reference to Red Dead Redemption, where entering the deep water led to instant death.)

Red Dead Redemption 2's world features different landscapes with occasional travelers, bandits, and wildlife, and urban settlements ranging from farmhouses to towns and cities. Horses are the main forms of transportation, of which there are various breeds with different attributes. The player can steal horses and must train or tame wild horses to use them; to own a horse, they must saddle or stable it. Repeated use of a horse begins a bonding process, increased by leading, petting, cleaning, and feeding it, and the player will acquire advantages as they ride their horse. Stagecoaches and trains can be used to travel; the player can hijack a train or stagecoach by threatening the driver and rob its contents or passengers. The player may witness or partake in random events in the world, including ambushes, crimes, pleas for assistance, ride-by shootings, public executions, and animal attacks. They may be rewarded when helping others. They may partake in side activities, including tasks with companions and strangers, dueling, bounty hunting, searching for collectibles such as rock carvings, and playing poker, blackjack, dominoes, and five finger filet. Hunting animals provides food, income, and materials for crafting items. The choice of weapon and shot placement affect the quality and value of meat and pelt, and the player can skin the animal or carry the carcass, which will rot over time, decrease its value, and attract predators.

Some story moments give the player the option to accept or decline additional missions and lightly shape the plot around their choices. They can choose different dialogue trees with non-player characters (NPCs), such as being friendly or insulting. If they choose to kill an NPC, they can loot their corpse. The Honor system measures how the player's actions are perceived: morally positive choices and deeds like helping strangers, following the law, and sparing opponents in a duel will increase Honor, while negative deeds such as theft and harming innocents will decrease it. Dialogue and outcomes often differ based on Honor level, and attaining milestones grants unique benefits: high Honor provides special outfits and store discounts, while low Honor grants more items from looting.

Red Dead Redemption 2's Dead Eye targeting system allows the player to slow down time and mark targets. Once the targeting sequence ends, the player fires to every marked location in a very short span of time.

In addition to health and stamina bars, the player has cores, which affect the rate at which their health and stamina regenerate. Freezing or overheating rapidly drains cores, preventable by wearing weather-appropriate clothing. The player can gain or lose weight depending on how much they eat; an underweight character will have less health but more stamina, while an overweight character can better absorb damage but with less stamina. Eating and sleeping replenishes cores. The player can bathe to remain clean and visit a barber to change hairstyles; hair grows realistically over time.

Weapons require cleaning to maintain their performance. Using a certain type of gun extensively improves weapon handling, reduces recoil, and increases the rate of reloading. The player can take cover, free aim, and target a person or animal. Individual body parts can be targeted to take down targets without killing them. Weapons consist of pistols, revolvers, repeaters, rifles, shotguns, bows, explosives, lassos, mounted Gatling guns, and melee weapons such as knives and tomahawks. The player can use Dead Eye to slow down time and mark targets. Once the targeting sequence ends, they fire to every marked location in a very short space of time. The Dead Eye system upgrades progressively and grants abilities such as targeting fatal points.

When the player commits a crime, witnesses alert the law; the player can stop them to avoid repercussions. Law enforcers investigate once alerted. When the player is caught, a bounty is set on their head; as they commit more crimes, their bounty grows higher and more lawmen will be sent to hunt them. If the player escapes the law, bounty hunters track them down. After committing enough crime, the U.S. Marshals will be sent to the player's location. To escape law enforcement, they can evade the wanted vicinity, hide from pursuers, or kill them. The bounty will remain on their head, lawmen and civilians will be more vigilant, and regions where crimes have been committed will be on lockdown. When caught by lawmen, the player can surrender if they are unarmed and on foot. They can remove their bounty by paying it off or spending time in jail.

== Synopsis ==
=== Setting and characters ===
The world of Red Dead Redemption 2 spans five fictitious U.S. states: New Hanover, Ambarino, and Lemoyne are located to the immediate north and east of New Austin and West Elizabeth, which return from Red Dead Redemption. (Note: The Mexican state of Nuevo Paraíso, which featured in Red Dead Redemption, is not a part of the new game world.) Ambarino is a sparsely populated mountain wilderness, with the only settlement being the Wapiti Indian Reservation; New Hanover encompasses a sweeping valley, woody foothills, and plains, while featuring the livestock town of Valentine, the riverside Van Horn Trading Post, and the coal town of Annesburg; Lemoyne is composed of bayous and plantations resembling the Deep South, and is home to the Southern town of Rhodes, the Creole village of Lagras, and the former French colony of Saint Denis, analogous to New Orleans. West Elizabeth consists of wide plains, dense forests, and the prosperous port town of Blackwater; the region is expanded from the original game with a northern portion containing the mountain resort town of Strawberry. New Austin is an arid desert region on the border with Mexico and centered on the frontier towns of Armadillo and Tumbleweed, featured in the original game. Parts of New Austin and West Elizabeth were redesigned to reflect the earlier time: Blackwater is under development, Armadillo is a ghost town as a result of a cholera outbreak, and Tumbleweed is on the decline.

The player controls Arthur Morgan (Roger Clark), an enforcer and veteran member of the Van der Linde gang, led by Dutch van der Linde (Benjamin Byron Davis), a charismatic anarchist who extols personal freedom and decries the encroaching march of modern civilization. The gang includes Dutch's best friend and co-leader Hosea Matthews (Curzon Dobell), John Marston (Rob Wiethoff) and his partner Abigail Roberts (Cali Elizabeth Moore) and son Jack Marston (Marissa Buccianti and Ted Sutherland), the lazy Uncle (John O'Creagh and James McBride), gunslingers Bill Williamson (Steve J. Palmer), Sean MacGuire (Michael Mellamphy), Javier Escuella (Gabriel Sloyer), and Micah Bell (Peter Blomquist), Black Indian hunter Charles Smith (Noshir Dalal), and housewife-turned-gunslinger Sadie Adler (Alex McKenna). The gang's criminal acts bring them into conflict with wealthy oil magnate Leviticus Cornwall (John Rue), who recruits the Pinkerton Detective Agency, led by Andrew Milton (John Hickok) and his subordinate Edgar Ross (Jim Bentley), to hunt them down. The gang also encounters Dutch's nemesis Colm O'Driscoll (Andrew Berg) and his gang, the warring Southern Gray and Braithwaite families, Italian Mafia boss Angelo Bronte (Jim Pirri), and controversial Cuban governor Colonel Alberto Fussar (Alfredo Narciso). Later in the story, Arthur helps the Native American leader Rains Fall (Graham Greene) and his son Eagle Flies (Jeremiah Bitsui), both members of the Wapiti Indian tribe, whose land is targeted by the U.S. Army, led by Colonel Henry Favours (Malachy Cleary).

=== Plot ===
After a botched ferry heist in 1899, the Van der Linde gang are forced to leave their substantial money stash and flee Blackwater. Realizing the progress of civilization is ending the time of outlaws, they decide to gain enough money to escape the law and retire. They rob a train owned by Cornwall, who hires Pinkertons to apprehend them. The gang perform jobs to earn money, as Dutch continually promises the next heist will be their last. Following a shootout with Cornwall's men in Valentine, the gang relocate to Lemoyne, where they work simultaneously for the Grays and Braithwaites in an attempt to turn them against each other. However, the families double-cross them: the Grays kill Sean during an ambush in Rhodes, while the Braithwaites kidnap and sell Jack to Bronte. The gang retaliate and destroy both families before retrieving Jack from Bronte, who offers them leads on work but eventually double-crosses them as well. Dutch kidnaps and feeds him to an alligator as revenge, disturbing Arthur and John.

The gang rob a bank in Saint Denis, planning to escape to Tahiti, but the Pinkertons intervene, killing Hosea and arresting John. Dutch, Arthur, Bill, Javier, and Micah flee on a ship bound for Cuba. A storm sinks the ship, and the men wash ashore on the island of Guarma, where they become embroiled in a war between tyrannical sugar plantation owner Fussar and the enslaved locals. After helping the revolutionaries kill Fussar, the group secure transport back to the United States and reunite with the rest of the gang, though they are soon assaulted by Pinkertons whom they repel.

Dutch, paranoid that a Pinkerton informant is within the gang, obsesses over one last heist. He doubts Arthur's loyalty after he disobeys him by liberating John earlier than planned, naming Micah his top lieutenant in Arthur's place. Arthur becomes concerned about Dutch, as he becomes insular, abandons their ideals, and murders Cornwall. Faced with his mortality after being diagnosed with tuberculosis, Arthur reflects on his actions and how to protect the gang, urging John to flee with Abigail and Jack and defying Dutch by aiding the local Wapiti Indians. Several gang members become disenchanted and leave, while Dutch and Micah arrange one final heist of an Army payroll train.

Arthur's faith in Dutch is shattered when he abandons Arthur to the Army, leaves John for dead, and refuses to rescue a kidnapped Abigail. Arthur and Sadie rescue Abigail from Milton, who names Micah as the Pinkertons' informant before Abigail kills him. Arthur returns to camp and openly accuses Micah of betrayal. Dutch, Bill, Javier, and Micah turn against Arthur and a newly returned John, but the standoff is broken when Pinkertons attack. The player can choose to have Arthur aid John's escape by delaying the Pinkertons or return to the camp to recover the gang's money. Micah ambushes Arthur, and Dutch intervenes in their fight. Arthur convinces Dutch to abandon Micah and leave. If the player has high honor, Arthur succumbs to his injuries and disease while watching the sunrise; if the player has low honor, Micah executes him.

Eight years later, in 1907, John and his family are trying to lead honest lives. They find work at a ranch where John reveals his combat experience against bandits threatening the ranch. Believing John is unwilling to give up his old ways, Abigail leaves with Jack. John takes a loan from the bank to purchase a ranch. He works with Uncle, Sadie, and Charles to build a new home, and proposes to Abigail on her return. Learning Micah is alive and formed his own gang, John, Sadie, and Charles assault his camp. They find Dutch, who shoots Micah after a tense standoff and leaves in silence, allowing John to kill Micah and claim the gang's Blackwater stash to pay his debt. John marries Abigail and they start a new life on their ranch alongside Jack and Uncle, as Sadie and Charles leave for other pursuits.

Mid-credits scenes show the fates of other surviving gang members. Edgar Ross tracks down Micah's killer, which leads him to John's ranch, foreshadowing the events of Red Dead Redemption.

== Development ==
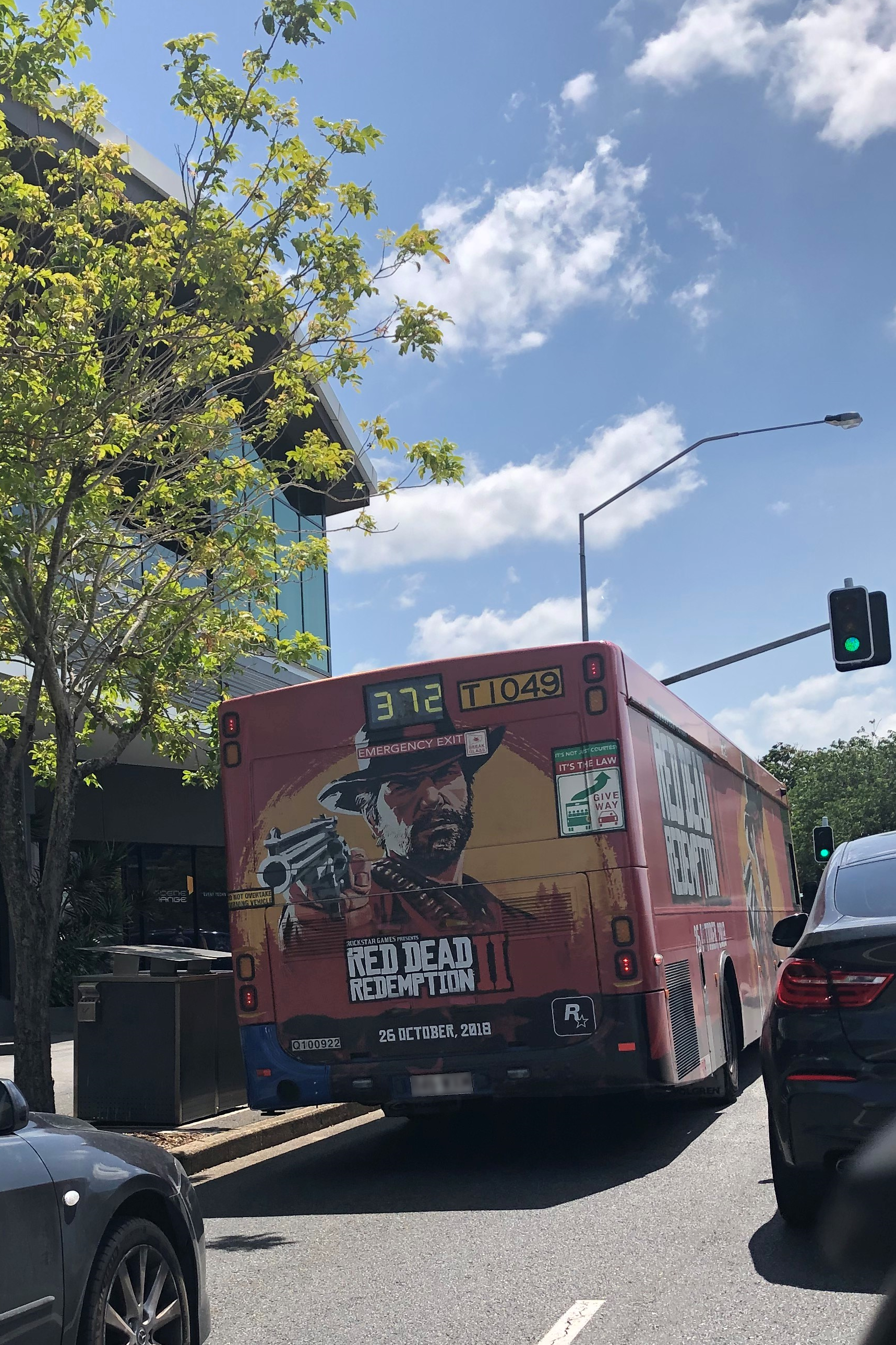
Brisbane, Queensland

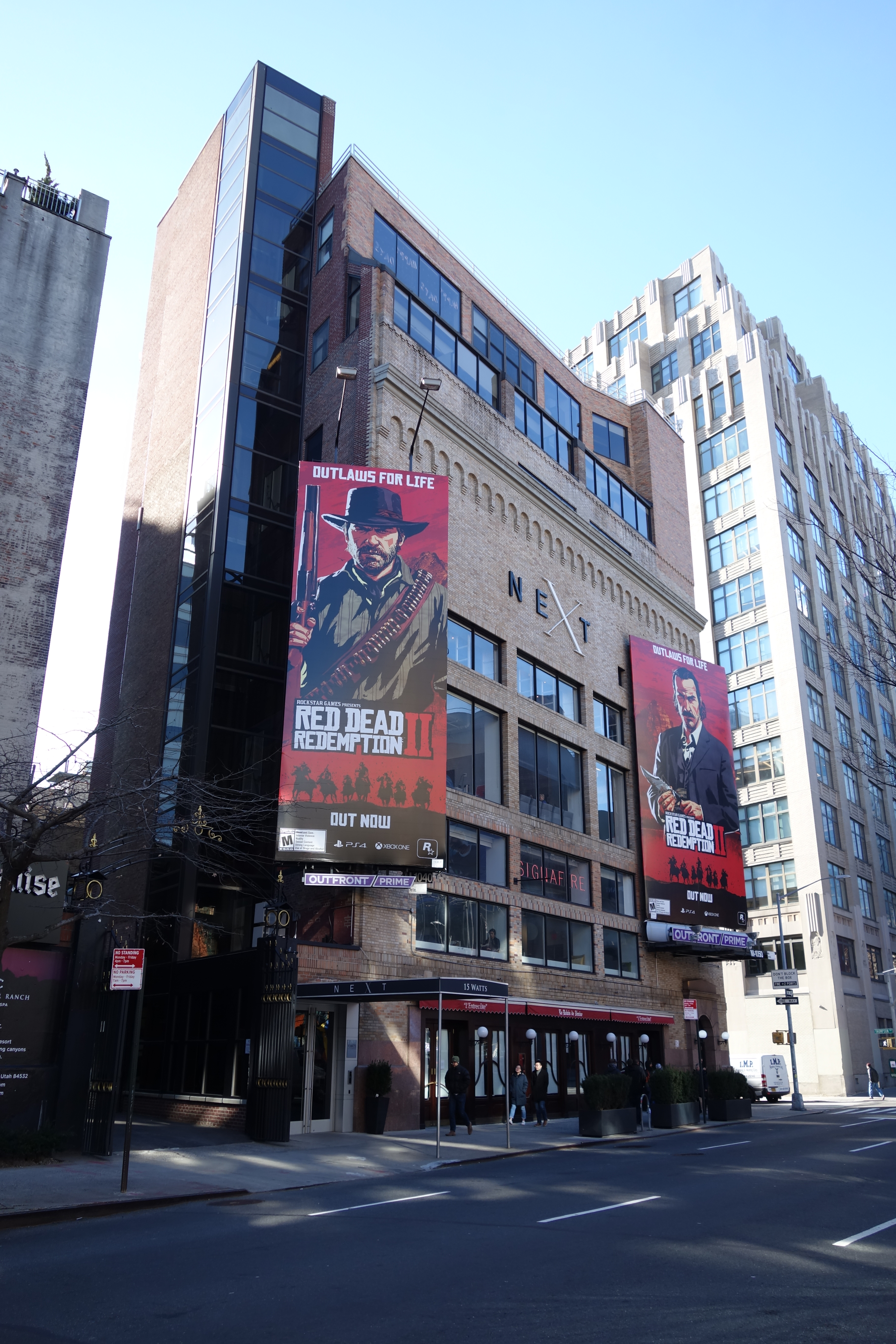
SoHo, Manhattan

The game was extensively promoted throughout the world.

Preliminary work on Red Dead Redemption 2 began shortly following the release of the original game, Red Dead Redemption (2010). Rockstar San Diego, the studio behind the original game, had a rough outline of the game by mid-2011, and by late 2012, rough scripts of the game had been completed. When Rockstar Games realized a group of distinct studios would not necessarily work, it co-opted all of its studios into one large team, presented simply as Rockstar Games, to facilitate development between 1,600 people; a total of around 2,000 people worked on the game. Analyst estimations place the game's combined development and marketing budget between US$370 million and US$540 million, which would make it one of the most expensive video games to develop.

While the main theme of the original game was to protect family at all costs, Red Dead Redemption 2 tells the story of a family's breakdown in the Van der Linde gang. The team was interested in exploring the story of why the gang fell apart, as frequently mentioned in the first game. Rockstar's Vice President of Creativity Dan Houser was inspired by film and literature when writing the game, though he avoided contemporary works to avoid being accused of stealing ideas. The team was not specifically inspired by film or art but rather real locations. They sought to create an accurate reflection of the time, with people and locations: the citizens feature a contrast between rich and poor, while the locales contrast between civilization and wilderness. Houser viewed the game as historical fiction, opting to allude to historical events instead of retelling them due to their unpleasantness.

Red Dead Redemption 2's recording sessions began in 2013. Rockstar wanted a diverse cast of characters within the Van der Linde gang. The writers put particular focus on the individual stories behind each character, exploring their life before the gang and their reasons for remaining with the group. Several characters were cut from the game during development as their personalities failed to add to the narrative. The actors sometimes improvised some additional lines, but mostly remained faithful to the script. The team decided the player would control one character in Red Dead Redemption 2, as opposed to the three protagonists in Rockstar's previous title Grand Theft Auto V (2013), to follow the character more personally and understand how the events impact him. They felt a single character is more appropriate for the narrative structure of a Western.

Red Dead Redemption 2 is the first game from Rockstar built specifically for the PlayStation 4 and Xbox One. Rockstar had tested these consoles' technical capabilities when porting Grand Theft Auto V, initially released on the PlayStation 3 and Xbox 360, to them. Once the team had defined what limitations were sustainable, they found the areas requiring the most focus. One of Rockstar's goals with Red Dead Redemption 2's gameplay was to make the player feel as though they are living in a world, instead of playing missions and watching cutscenes. A method used to achieve this was through the gang's moving camp, where the player can interact with other characters. The team ensured the characters maintained the same personality and mood from cutscene to gameplay to make the world feel more alive and realistic.

Woody Jackson, who worked with Rockstar on the original game and Grand Theft Auto V, returned to compose Red Dead Redemption 2's original score. Red Dead Redemption 2 has three different types of score: narrative, which is heard during the missions in the game's story; interactive, when the player is roaming the open world or in multiplayer; and environmental, which includes campfire singing songs or a character playing music in the world. The game's music regularly reacts according to the player's decisions in the world. Jackson purchased several instruments from the Wrecking Crew featured on classic cowboy films. In total, over 110 musicians worked on the music for the game. Daniel Lanois produced the original vocal tracks for the game, collaborating with artists such as D'Angelo, Willie Nelson, Rhiannon Giddens, and Josh Homme. Director of music and audio Ivan Pavlovich engaged saxophone player Colin Stetson, experimental band Senyawa, and musician Arca to work on the score.

Prior to the game's release, Dan Houser stated the team had been working 100-hour weeks "several times in 2018", which many sources interpreted as "crunch time" for the entire development staff. Rockstar clarified it only meant senior writing staff and only for three weeks. Houser added the company would never expect or force any employee to work as long as was stated, and those staying late were powered by their passion. However, other Rockstar employees argued Houser's statements did not give an accurate picture of the company's culture, which included "mandatory" overtime and years-long periods of crunch. Due to the salary-based nature of employment contracts, many employees were not compensated for their overtime work and instead depended on year-end bonus payments that hinged on sales performance. Many employees concurred that working conditions had improved since Red Dead Redemption's development. By April 2020, several employees reported the company had made significant changes and many were cautiously optimistic about Rockstar's future.

Rockstar Games first teased Red Dead Redemption 2 on October 16–17, 2016, before the official announcement on October 18, 2016. Originally due for release in the second half of 2017, the game was delayed twice: first to Q1/Q2 2018, and later to October 26, 2018. According to Rockstar, the game required extra development time for "polish". To spur pre-order sales, Rockstar collaborated with several retail outlets to provide special edition versions of the game. A companion app, released alongside the game for Android and iOS devices, acts as a second screen wherein the player can view in-game items such as catalogs, journals, and a real-time mini-map. The game was released for Windows on November 5, 2019, (Note: The game launched for Windows through the Rockstar Games Launcher and select other storefronts in November, and launched on Steam in December.) and was a launch title for Stadia when the service launched on November 19, 2019. The Windows version has visual and technical improvements.

=== Red Dead Online ===
The online multiplayer component to Red Dead Redemption 2, titled Red Dead Online, was released as a public beta on November 27, 2018, to players who owned a special edition of the base game, and then progressively opened to all owners. Players customize a character and are free to explore the environment alone or in a group. The game world features events in which up to 32 players can partake individually or with a posse group. As players complete activities throughout the game world, they receive experience points to raise their characters in rank and receive bonuses, thereby progressing in the game. Though Red Dead Online and Red Dead Redemption 2 share assets and gameplay, Rockstar viewed them as separate products with independent trajectories, reflected in its decision to launch the multiplayer title separately. Player progression in the public beta carried over when the beta ended on May 15, 2019. A standalone client for Red Dead Online was released on December 1, 2020, for PlayStation 4, Windows, and Xbox One. Post-release content was added to the game through free title updates. In July 2022, Rockstar announced Red Dead Online would not receive more major updates, instead focusing on smaller missions and the expansion of existing modes as development resources were withdrawn to focus on Grand Theft Auto VI.

== Reception ==
=== Critical response ===
PlayStation 4 and Xbox One reception

Aggregate score
Aggregator	Score
Metacritic	97/100

Review scores
Publication	Score
Destructoid	9.5/10
Edge	10/10
Electronic Gaming Monthly	10/10
Game Informer	10/10
GameSpot	9/10
GamesRadar+	5/5
Giant Bomb	5/5
IGN	10/10
USgamer	4.5/5

Red Dead Redemption 2 received "universal acclaim" from critics, according to review aggregator Metacritic. It is one of the highest-rated games on Metacritic, and the highest-rated PlayStation 4 and Xbox One game alongside Rockstar's Grand Theft Auto V. Reviewers praised the story, characters, open world, graphics, music, and level of detail. Matt Bertz of Game Informer described the game as "the biggest and most cohesive adventure Rockstar Games has ever created", and GamesRadar's David Meikleham felt it "represents the current pinnacle of video game design". Keza MacDonald of The Guardian declared it "a landmark game" and "a new high water-mark for lifelike video game worlds"; IGN's Luke Reilly named it "one of the greatest games of the modern age". Peter Suderman, writing for The New York Times, considered Red Dead Redemption 2 an example of video games as works of art, comparing its abilities to "[tell] individual stories against the backdrop of national and cultural identity, deconstructing their genres while advancing the form", to the modern state of film and television with similar works like The Godfather and The Sopranos.

Regarding its narrative, Meikleham of GamesRadar called Red Dead Redemption 2 "perhaps the boldest triple-A game ever made", praising the unpredictability of the narrative and comparing its epilogue to The Last of Us (2013). The Guardian's MacDonald praised the story's twists, applauding the writers' ability to feed smaller stories into the overall narrative. Nick Plessas of Electronic Gaming Monthly (EGM) noted the best stories "are to be found in the margins", discovered and written by the player. Game Informer's Bertz felt the narrative rarely suffered from repetition, an impressive feat considering the game's scope, though expressed desire for more passive, quiet moments. Conversely, GameSpot's Kallie Plagge was frustrated by the predictability later in the narrative though acknowledged its importance to Arthur's story. Alex Navarro of Giant Bomb felt the narrative suffered in its clichéd Native American portrayal and side missions. Some reviewers commented on the game's slow opening hours and its lengthy epilogue.

EGM's Plessas found the journey of redemption for Arthur "far more redeeming" than John's in Red Dead Redemption, noting his sins heightened his sympathy for the character. Conversely, Eurogamer's Martin Robinson considered Arthur less compelling than Marston, resulting in a confusing narrative. GameSpot's Plagge felt the new characters contributed to the story's quality and Mike Williams of USgamer wrote they "feel like actual people" due to their varied personalities. IGN's Reilly praised the cultural variety and avoidance of caricatures, and Giant Bomb's Navarro noted the characters possess humanity often lacking in other Rockstar games, particularly in the thoughtful portrayal of Arthur's internal conflicts. MacDonald of The Guardian found the performances led to more believable characters. Polygon's Chris Plante found the political commentary shone when focusing on the Braithwaite and Gray families but considered the portrayal of Native American characters insensitive and confusing. Eirik Gumeny, writing for Polygon, praised the realistic and unfiltered depiction of tuberculosis, including the misguided and hostile reactions from others.

Red Dead Redemption 2's open world was praised as one of the greatest in video games.

Several critics considered Red Dead Redemption 2's open world among the greatest in video games; EGM's Plessas said it "pushes industry boundaries in both size and detail", and The Guardian's MacDonald praised the imitation of real American landscapes. IGN's Reilly considered the world "broader, more beautiful, and more varied" than its predecessor's, due in part to how each environment feels alive. GameSpot's Plagge felt compelled to explore the open world due to its variety, reactivity, and surprises. GamesRadar's Meikleham called Red Dead Redemption 2 "the best looking video game of all time" with some of the most impressive lighting and weather systems, and USgamer's Williams considered it one of the best-looking on PlayStation 4 and Xbox One. IGN's Reilly praised the lighting engine, facial animation, and level of granular detail. Game Informer's Bertz lauded the attention to detail and found the world felt more alive due to "an unrivaled dynamic weather system, ambient sound effects, and the most ambitious ecology of flora and fauna ever seen in games".

Several reviewers lauded the level of detail in all aspects of gameplay—EGM's Plessas felt the attention to detail led to deeper immersion—though some found the sheer amount of realism restricted opportunities and unnecessarily prolonged some animations. IGN's Reilly felt Arthur's movement did not feel cumbersome despite being "heavier" than Grand Theft Auto V's protagonists, and found the intimate battles more exciting. Polygon's Plante considered the conversation options limited but still an improvement over the violence of other action games. Eurogamer's Robinson voiced frustration at the lack of freedom in some story missions. Some reviewers criticized the controls and found its button layout and user interface inconsistent and confusing.

A YouTube channel was briefly suspended in November 2018 after posting several videos of his player character murdering a female suffragette NPC, including feeding her to an alligator and dropping her down a mineshaft; (Note: YouTube suspended the channel for violating their community guidelines, citing its gratuitous violence. The creator protested the decision, calling it hypocritical as in-game violence against men did not receive the same response. He claimed the actions were apolitical and he did not support sexist comments but did not wish to censor them; GameRevolution's Matt Leonard called this "plain bullshit" as he continued posting similar videos encouraging the same behavior. YouTube, noting a reviewer had misinterpreted its guidelines, restored the channel with an age restriction on the suffragette videos.) the majority of the videos' comments were misogynistic. Some critics questioned if Rockstar was partly to blame for the behavior, as the game does not limit attacks on the suffragette as it does other characters, such as children; in Games and Culture, Kristine Jørgensen and Torill Elvira Mortensen acknowledged this concern but recognized the responsibility ultimately lay with the player, and limiting attacks could be interpreted as a political statement from Rockstar and a restriction on the player's freedom of expression. Writing for The Journal of the Gilded Age and Progressive Era, Hilary Jane Locke and Thomas Mackay wrote it "points to a sharp contrast between the game's portrayal of Progressive Era politics ... and how some players have responded to its depictions thereof". In Public History Weekly, Moritz Hoffman noted the incident reflected a newer issue of open world games: granting freedom without penalties promotes disinhibition.

Windows reception

Aggregate score
Aggregator	Score
Metacritic	93/100

Review scores
Publication	Score
Destructoid	9.5/10
Jeuxvideo.com	19/20
PC Gamer (US)	88/100
PCGamesN	10/10
PCMag	4/5

Red Dead Redemption 2's Windows release received "universal acclaim" according to Metacritic; it is one of the highest-rated PC games. PCGamesN's Sam White thought the graphics improvements made the open world "[look] the best it ever has". Destructoid's Carter praised the addition of the Photo Mode. Sam Machkovech of Ars Technica felt the cutscene animations did not scale well to higher frame rates but considered the gameplay far superior to console. Rock, Paper, Shotgun's Matthew Castle lauded the adapted controls, particularly when painting targets in Dead Eye, though felt they took longer to familiarize oneself with. PC Gamer's James Davenport found the first-person perspective superior on the Windows version due to the responsiveness of the mouse but noted the game crashed several times; Jeuxvideo.com's Jean-Kléber Lauret echoed similar criticisms, observing the graphical and technical enhancements required advanced hardware. Polygon's Samit Sarkar criticized the port's technical issues and declared it unplayable at the time. One week after release, PCMag's Tony Polanco said the technical issues had been mostly solved.

=== Accolades ===
Red Dead Redemption 2 won over 175 Game of the Year awards, receiving wins at the Australian Games Awards, Brazil Game Awards, Fun & Serious Game Festival, and Italian Video Game Awards, and from outlets such as 4Players, AusGamers, Complex, Digital Trends, Edge, Electronic Gaming Monthly, Gamereactor, GameSpot, The Guardian, Hot Press, news.com.au, The Telegraph, USgamer, and Vulture. On Metacritic, Red Dead Redemption 2 was the highest-rated game of 2018. The game was named among the best games of the 2010s by Entertainment.ie, The Hollywood Reporter, Metacritic, National Post, NME, Stuff, Thrillist, VG247, and Wired UK. At the Game Awards 2018, the game received eight nominations and won four awards: Best Audio Design, Best Narrative, Best Score/Music, and Best Performance for Clark as Arthur. At the 6th SXSW Gaming Awards, Red Dead Redemption 2 was named Trending Game of the Year and won Excellence in SFX and Technical Achievement. The game earned eight nominations at the 22nd Annual D.I.C.E. Awards, seven at the 19th Game Developers Choice Awards, and six at the 15th British Academy Games Awards.

== Sales ==
Since the previous installment in the series was among the highest-reviewed and best-selling games of the seventh generation of video game consoles, many analysts believed Red Dead Redemption 2 would be one of the highest-selling games of 2018 and have a great effect on other game sales during the fourth quarter. After the game's announcement in October 2016, analyst Ben Schacter of Macquarie Research estimated it would sell 12 million copies in its first quarter, while analysts at Cowen and Company gave a "conservative" estimate of 15 million sales. In July 2018, industry analyst Mat Piscatella predicted Red Dead Redemption 2 would be the best-selling game of 2018, outselling other blockbuster releases such as Battlefield V, Call of Duty: Black Ops 4, and Fallout 76; some industry commentators noted annual franchises like Assassin's Creed and Call of Duty were launching their 2018 entries—Odyssey and Black Ops 4, respectively—earlier than usual, predicting an avoidance of competition with Red Dead Redemption 2. Shortly before release in October 2018, Schacter estimated the game would sell 15 million copies in its first quarter, though noted investor expectations were at 20 million copies; Michael Pachter of Wedbush Securities predicted 25 million. Piper Jaffray's Michael Olson projected revenue between US$400 and $500 million in the first three days, while Cowen Inc.'s Doug Creutz estimated between $550 and $600 million.

Red Dead Redemption 2's cumulative quarterly sales. (Note: Red Dead Redemption 2's total sales as of: 2018: 23 million; 2019: 29 million; 2020: 36 million; 2021: 43 million; 2022: 50 million; 2023: 61 million; 2024: 70 million; 2025: 82 million) View source data.

Red Dead Redemption 2 had the largest opening weekend in entertainment history, making over US$725 million in revenue in three days. It was the second-highest-grossing entertainment launch (behind Grand Theft Auto V) and set records for largest pre-orders, first-day sales, and three-day sales on the PlayStation Network. The share price for Rockstar's parent company, Take-Two Interactive, rose 9% in the week after release. VentureBeat's Dean Takahashi noted the game likely broke-even in its first week and, based on analyst estimates, would begin to earn a profit by December 2018. The game exceeded Red Dead Redemption's lifetime sales within eight days, and shipped over 17 million copies within thirteen and 23 million by the end of the year, generating $1.38 billion in revenue; sales reached 50 million in 2022, with yearly increases of six to twelve million. By dollar sales, it was the best-selling game of its first seven years and the seventh-best of the 2010s. It is the third-best-selling video game, with over 89 million sold by June 2026.

In the United States, Red Dead Redemption 2 was 2018's best-selling game, ranking second in October behind Black Ops 4, first in November, and third in December. It was the twelfth-best-selling game of 2019, and maintained its placement in the top charts throughout 2019 and early 2020. In the United Kingdom, Red Dead Redemption 2 was the best-selling retail game in its first week and the second-fastest-selling game of 2018 behind FIFA 19. The opening week physical sales doubled its predecessor's (with 68% from the PlayStation 4 version) and it was the third-fastest-selling non-FIFA game in its generation, behind the Call of Duty games Black Ops III and Advanced Warfare. It consistently ranked within the yearly best-sellers in Europe (Note: In Europe, Red Dead Redemption 2 was the second-best-selling game in 2018, fifth in 2019, tenth in 2020, sixth in 2021, twelfth in 2022, eighth in 2023, and seventh in 2024.) and the United Kingdom (Note: In the United Kingdom, Red Dead Redemption 2 was the second-best-selling game in 2018, fifth in 2019, eleventh in 2020, sixth in 2021, ninth in 2022, and eighth in 2023.) for several years, including second in 2018. Within its first week in Japan, the PlayStation 4 version sold 132,984 copies, charting at number one overall. In Australia, it was the best-selling game of 2018 and fifteenth in 2020. Worldwide, the Windows version sold 406,000 copies upon launch in November 2019, doubling to over one million after its release on Steam the following month.

== Legal disputes ==
On February 6, 2018, we published an article that was sourced from a confidential corporate document. We should have known this information was confidential and should not have published it. We unreservedly apologise to Take-Two Games and we have undertaken not to repeat such actions again. We have also agreed to donate over £1 million to charities chosen by Take-Two Games.

— Trusted Reviews, November 2018

In February 2018, Trusted Reviews published an article leaking several features due to be included in Red Dead Redemption 2, including a first-person perspective and Red Dead Online's battle royale mode. The information was obtained from a leaked document in August 2017, which had been sent to other sites at the time; Trusted Reviews published the article when promotional material validated the document's authenticity. In November 2018, the article was replaced with an apology, noting the "information was confidential" and should not have been published. In a settlement with Take-Two, Trusted Reviews agreed to donate more than £1 million (US$1.3 million); Rockstar directed it be donated to the American Indian College Fund, the American Prairie Reserve, and the First Nations Development Institute. Neither Take-Two nor Trusted Reviews indicated any specific laws had been violated. Several journalists recognized the uniqueness of successful legal action against media outlets; MCV/Develop's Seth Barton called it "an incredible development for games industry journalism" and felt it would result in hesitancy to leak information regarding Rockstar in future. Kotaku's Keza MacDonald similarly described the events as "extraordinary" as it likely meant Take-Two argued the information was a trade secret and Trusted Reviews was unable to use a public interest defense; she added "it might prove to be influential" and prevent publications from leaking information, even if obtained legally.

Securitas AB, the parent company of the modern-day Pinkerton agency, issued a cease and desist notice to Take-Two Interactive on December 13, 2018, asserting Red Dead Redemption 2's use of the Pinkerton name and badge imagery was against their trademark and demanded royalties for each copy of the game sold or they would take legal action. Take-Two filed a complaint against Securitas on January 11, 2019, maintaining the Pinkerton name was strongly associated with the Wild West, and its use of the term did not infringe on the Pinkerton trademark. Take-Two sought a summary judgment to declare the use of Pinkerton in the game as allowed fair use. Game Informer's Javy Gwaltney agreed with Take-Two's claims, questioning why Securitas had not targeted other works depicting the Pinkerton agency in the past; he felt "the company likely just wants a cut of [the game's] profits". In response to Take-Two's complaint, Pinkerton president Jack Zahran described the game's portrayal of Pinkertons as "baseless" and "inaccurate", noting Pinkerton employees would "have to explain to their young game players why Red Dead Redemption 2 encourages people to murder Pinkertons", but hoped the companies could come to an "amicable solution". By April 2019, Securitas withdrew its claims and Take-Two moved to withdraw its complaint.

== Legacy ==
=== Critical reassessment ===
Critics agreed Red Dead Redemption 2 was among the best games of the eighth generation of video game consoles. GQ's White described it as "a generation-defining release", and VG247's McKeand named it "a benchmark for other open world games to aspire to". IGN ranked the game as the third-best Xbox One game and eleventh-best PC and PlayStation 4 game. In November 2020, TechRadar listed it among the greatest games of the eighth generation; editor Gerald Lynch felt it set the bar for believable open world games. In December, GamesRadar+ ranked it the fifth-best game of the generation, noting it had already begun to influence the open-world and role-playing genres.

Since its release, Red Dead Redemption 2 has been cited as one of the greatest video games ever made. In March 2019, Popular Mechanics ranked it 24th on its list of greatest games. In October, IGN added Red Dead Redemption 2 to its list of top 100 video games, ranked 62nd in 2019 and promoted to 8th in 2021; editor Luke Reilly praised its "uncompromising detail" and wrote it "stands shoulder-to-shoulder with Grand Theft Auto V as one of gaming's greatest open-world achievements". In July 2020, Dylan Haas of Mashable considered the game his second favorite of all time, citing its realism, world, characters, and narrative. In November 2021, GamesRadar+ ranked it 28th on its list of top 50 games, describing it as "one of the best sandbox games ever made".

In April 2022, GamingBolt's Ravi Sinha ranked Red Dead Redemption 2 the second-best game of all time, citing its characters, narrative, attention to detail, and visual fidelity, naming it Rockstar's "finest work". In September, USA Today ranked it 21st on its list of best games, praising Arthur as "one of the most likable protagonists in games" and describing the world as "the real star of the show". In May 2023, over 200 developers, journalists, and content creators surveyed by GQ ranked Red Dead Redemption 2 the 15th-best game; GQ's Sam White and Robert Leedham called it "perhaps the greatest flex in video game history" which set a "benchmark for cinematic storytelling and attention to detail". In January 2025, Rolling Stone ranked it the 16th-best game; Ashley Bardhan praised its environment as "one of the most lavishly designed open worlds in existence".

=== Cultural influence ===
Red Dead Redemption 2 was mentioned several times in the South Park episodes "Time to Get Cereal" and "Nobody Got Cereal?" in November 2018. Game footage was used in the first music video for "Old Town Road" by Lil Nas X in December, which scholars saw as the influence of the game on Western culture and country music. Tenacious D mentioned the game in their song "Video Games", describing it as "an incredible journey through old American history". The Legend of Zelda: Tears of the Kingdom (2023) producer Eiji Aonuma said open world games like Red Dead Redemption 2 inspired the developers.

Joe Meizies won Virtual Photographer of the Year at the London Games Festival in April 2022 for his virtual photography in Red Dead Redemption 2. Tombstone Redemption, a fan event organized by Kenney Palkow, was held in Tombstone, Arizona, on July 29–30, 2023, with an estimated 10,000 attendees, including fourteen cast members from the series. Tombstone was redressed to resemble the in-game Blackwater. The event returned the following year as Black Hills Redemption, held in Deadwood, South Dakota, on June 21–23, with twenty actors present as guests.

In July 2021, a study published by the University of Exeter and Truro and Penwith College found Red Dead Redemption 2 players had an increased understanding of ecology and animal behavior; players were able to identify three more animals on average than other gamers. In late 2021, University of Tennessee professor Tore Olsson started teaching "Red Dead America", a class about United States history in the late nineteenth and early twentieth centuries, including the frontier myth, Jim Crow laws, settler colonialism, and women's suffrage, inspired by the lack of academic discourse surrounding the game's history. Olsson found the class attracted larger enrollments than other history subjects. He published a book about the topic, titled Red Dead's History, in August 2024; the audiobook is narrated by Roger Clark, who portrayed Arthur.
