= Dead Kids (South Park) =

- South Park episode
- Episode no.: Season 22; Episode 1
- Directed by: Trey Parker
- Written by: Trey Parker
- Production code: 2201
- Original air date: September 26, 2018

Episode chronology
← Previous "Splatty Tomato"	Next → "A Boy and a Priest"
- South Park season 22

"Dead Kids" is the first episode in the twenty-second season of the American animated television series South Park. It is the 288th episode of the series overall, and first aired on Comedy Central in the United States on September 26, 2018.

The episode addresses the phenomenon of school shootings in the United States, and parodies the cultural significance of the 2018 superhero film Black Panther.

== Plot ==
A school shooting occurs at South Park Elementary resulting in a fatality. However, when a SWAT member storms the classroom to secure it, the fourth grade teacher and her students are nonchalant, attempting to ignore the disruption while reviewing a recent mathematics test. Eric Cartman is angry because having copied his answers from classmate Tolkien Black, he failed the test, and believes that Tolkien initially put incorrect answers on his own test paper in a deliberate ploy to cause Cartman's failure. Cartman becomes worried that Tolkien was motivated by rumors that Cartman disliked the feature film Black Panther, whose success holds cultural significance for Black Americans, but Tolkien says he has not seen the film, spurring the paranoid Cartman to try to confirm his suspicions. Ultimately, despite Tolkien's repeated denial of ever having seen the film, Cartman concludes that Tolkien saw it, and shares his own opinion that the film was not that good. After Cartman and Tolkien successfully evade gunshots at yet another shooting at their school with help from Butters who is serving as armed hall monitor, Tolkien allows Cartman to copy his answers on their next test.

Sharon Marsh, the mother of Cartman's classmate Stan, is outraged not only at the school shootings, but at the nonchalance on the part of other townspeople, including her husband Randy, who comes to believe that her disposition is caused by either her menstrual cycle or the onset of menopause. He attempts to shower her with love in the form of a party at which he serenades her, but Sharon angrily informs Randy and their neighbors that she is not undergoing menopause, and storms off. She later apologizes to an astonished Randy for the pain and suffering they have been experiencing, admitting that she may have been overly emotional lately. They receive word that Stan was shot at another shooting at his school. Instead of panicking, Sharon exhibits a calm, nonchalant attitude like those of Randy and the others, and a relieved Randy lovingly embraces her.

== Reception ==
The episode scored 1.09 in the ratings. This is the lowest for any season premiere in the show's history, and well below the 1.68 ratings which the season 21 premiere earned.

John Hugar of The A.V. Club gave the episode a B, stating "at this point, South Park has reached a point that we might call 'predictably shocking.' We know they're going to take an issue of the day, and present in some skewed subversive fashion, to the point that when they do so, it really shouldn't be surprising anymore. Yet somehow, figuring out exactly how they're going to pull it off is not only still enjoyable, but it can still produce plenty of 'wait, what?!' moments over the course of a season, or in this case, in the course of a single episode."

Jesse Schedeen of IGN gave the episode a 6.8 out of 10, stating it "definitely hit close to home, finding a darkly comic and relatable take on a uniquely American problem. However, this episode struggled to build on the elegant simplicity of its premise, rehashing a lot of the same beats over the course of the half hour."
