= Torn Banner Studios =

Canadian video game developer

Torn Banner Studios Inc.
- Type: Private
- Industry: Video games
- Founded: 2010; 16 years ago
- Founder: Steve Piggott
- Headquarters: Toronto, Canada
- Key people: Steve Piggott (president)
- Products: Chivalry: Medieval Warfare; Mirage: Arcane Warfare
- Website: tornbanner.com

Torn Banner Studios Inc. is a Canadian video game developer based in Toronto.

== History ==
Torn Banner Studios was founded in 2010 by Steve Piggott of Team Chivalry, the development team of Age of Chivalry, a 2007 mod for Half-Life 2. The studio's first game was Chivalry: Medieval Warfare; after a successful Kickstarter campaign raising $85,934, it was released independently in October 2012. The game received the 2012 "Indie of the Year" award from Indie DB. Sega released Torn Banner's NeverMine in July 2016 as part of the Help: The Game collection, with proceeds going to the War Child charity.

Torn Banner was affected by the 2022–2025 video game industry downturn and announced it was laying off staff in December 2024, but remained committed to shipping No More Room in Hell 2 out of early access and to a full release.

== Games developed ==
Year	Title	Platform(s)	Publisher(s)
2012	Chivalry: Medieval Warfare	Microsoft Windows, OS X, Linux, PlayStation 3, PlayStation 4, Xbox 360, Xbox One	Torn Banner Studios, Activision
2016	NeverMine	Microsoft Windows	Sega
2017	Mirage: Arcane Warfare	Microsoft Windows	Torn Banner Studios
2021	Chivalry 2	Microsoft Windows, PlayStation 4, PlayStation 5, Xbox One, Xbox Series X/S	Tripwire Interactive
2024	No More Room in Hell 2	Windows	Torn Banner Studios
