= Nobody Got Cereal? =

- South Park episode
- Episode no.: Season 22; Episode 7
- Directed by: Trey Parker
- Written by: Trey Parker
- Production code: 2207
- Original air date: November 14, 2018

Episode chronology
← Previous "Time to Get Cereal"	Next → "Buddha Box"
- South Park season 22

"Nobody Got Cereal?" is the seventh episode of the twenty-second season of the American animated television series South Park. The 294th overall episode of the series, it aired on Comedy Central in the United States on November 14, 2018.

The episode is the second part of a two-episode story in which former U.S. Vice President Al Gore is enlisted by the main characters in response to a rampage by a demonic being called ManBearPig. It serves as a parody of climate change denial.

== Plot ==
In continuation from the previous episode, the demonic monster ManBearPig (a creature first referenced in the episode of the same name) continues his rampage through the town of South Park, brutally murdering and consuming citizens in broad daylight. Stan Marsh and his friends Kyle Broflovski, Eric Cartman and Kenny McCormick are in a jail, having been arrested by Sergeant Yates, who believes that the recent murders were the result of school shootings perpetrated by the four boys. Exploiting their guard's obsession with the video game Red Dead Redemption 2 (a pastime popular among the townsfolk that serves as a recurring reference throughout the two-episode story), Stan and his friends escape jail. When Stan learns that his grandfather, Grampa Marsh, has been talking about ManBearPig since Randy was 14, Stan confronts him. Grampa Marsh reveals that when he and his friends were young and foolish, and South Park was a smaller town, they made a deal with ManBearPig for luxurious things like expensive cars and premium boutique ice cream, not thinking about the future, or what this would mean for their grandchildren.

Sergeant Yates continues to deny the existence of ManBearPig, insisting that the gruesome crimes are the result of school shootings. Stan and his friends reconvene in the woods with their allies, former U.S. Vice President Al Gore and Satan, whom the group summoned in the previous episode, to inform them of ManBearPig's origin. After contending with the haughty and self-satisfied Gore's continued self-aggrandizement, Cartman convinces Satan that it is time that he did something for the people of South Park, who lately have been doing a lot of his work for him. Satan confronts ManBearPig in a furiously violent brawl in the middle of town, but is fatally beaten, and ascends to heaven as an angel.

Grandpa Marsh takes refuge with Stan and his friends at South Park Elementary, where they are again surrounded by the police. However, Sergeant Yates appears and admits that he has been a fool by denying ManBearPig's existence, and did not realize this until he saw the effect that his stubbornness had on his marriage. Yates muses that it is never too late to do the right thing, and asks Stan and his friends if they know what that is. Stan says that they do, and will put an end to the deal once and for all: he and his friends are given power of attorney to represent the town, and enter sit-down negotiations with ManBearPig and his attorney to void their prior deal. ManBearPig agrees to leave the town and never return in exchange for the town's agreement to give up soy sauce and Red Dead Redemption 2, but the town's reluctance to do this leads to continued negotiations, and increased demands by ManBearPig. The people of South Park selfishly end up making a new deal with ManBearPig at the expense of Third World children, letting it have a new murder rampage in five years.

== Reception ==
Jesse Schedeen with IGN rated the episode an 8.3 out of 10, and summarized in his review, "The latter half of Season 22's epic two-parter definitely lacks the novelty of the first. That's to be expected given how much this episode leans on the same ManBearPig and Red Dead Redemption material. Still, it manages to escalate that conflict in amusing ways while further hammering home the climate change metaphor."

John Hugar with The A.V. Club gave the episode a B grade, and commented in his review, "It was a bit reminiscent of episodes like 'The Biggest Douche in the Universe', where the public's willingness to completely ignore the obvious truths being laid before them in order to continue believing what they want to believe is played for laughs. While South Park's politics have evolved over the years, one of its most firmly held beliefs is that people are idiots, and that was fully on display in 'Nobody Got Cereal.'"

During filming of his appearance on The Daily Show, Al Gore was asked about the way South Park had portrayed him and ManBearPig in the two episodes, and replied, "I thought it was a hell of a statement by South Park, and I appreciated it a lot."

== See also ==
- An Inconvenient Sequel: Truth to Power (2017)
- Climate change adaptation and mitigation
