= Tegridy Farms =

- South Park episode
- Episode no.: Season 22; Episode 4
- Directed by: Trey Parker
- Written by: Trey Parker
- Production code: 2204
- Original air date: October 17, 2018

Episode chronology
← Previous "The Problem with a Poo"	Next → "The Scoots"
- South Park season 22

"Tegridy Farms" is the fourth episode of the twenty-second season of the American animated television series South Park. The 291st overall episode of the series, it aired on Comedy Central in the United States on October 17, 2018.

The episode parodies the popularity of vaping, its increased use by children, and the legalized use of marijuana in Colorado.

== Plot ==
Randy and Sharon Marsh are called in to school counselor Mr. Mackey's office because their daughter Shelly has been texting inappropriate pictures to the recess monitor so that she can get away with vaping during recess. Frustrated with recent problems in South Park, including events over the previous three episodes, Randy convinces Sharon to sell their home and move out to a cannabis farm Randy names Tegridy Farms, where he harvests the plant and manufactures a variety of products from hemp. Randy meets an agricultural inspector who will authorize him to sell his marijuana. That inspector turns out to be Towelie, who personally samples the various strains of marijuana. Randy is later visited by a representative of a vape manufacturer called Big Vape Colorado, who wants to add Randy's product to their line, but Randy angrily refuses, not wanting to be associated with vaping.

Fourth grader Kyle Broflovski discovers that his younger brother Ike and his kindergarten classmates are also vaping. Kyle and his friends, Stan Marsh, Eric Cartman, and Kenny McCormick discover that Butters Stotch is the person selling vaping pens and accessories to the children. Cartman punches Butters, ostensibly for this reason, but it is later revealed that Butters and Cartman are partners in this venture. When Kyle learns this, he resolves to report this to the principal, but Cartman begs Kyle to let them continue selling until they get out of debt for the products they already purchased. Kyle agrees on the condition that Cartman promise to stop marketing to kindergartners, but Cartman nonetheless has a costumed mascot named Vaping Man crash through the cafeteria wall in the style of the Kool-Aid Man to boost sales among young children, much to Kyle's outrage. Cartman and Butters introduce Kyle to their dealer outside the headquarters of Big Vape Colorado, where he has just purchased his supplies, but then Cartman implicates Kyle and Butters by beating the dealer and planting a dead prostitute's body near his two classmates before stealing the dealer's cash and vape products. Kyle goes to Mr. Mackey's house to ask for help, but Butters and Cartman are already there. Pulling Kyle aside, they tell him that the sixth graders are angry at all of them for attacking their vape supplier, and that the only solution is to rob the vape store to appease the original dealer, who is revealed to be Vaping Man.

Angered that his neighbor Joe has sold his farm to Big Vape, and further outraged that his son Stan was caught with a vaping pen at school, Randy goes to a Big Vape Colorado store and attacks the patrons there. Kyle, Butters, and Cartman steal the store's vape juice, only to be confronted by the Big Vape Colorado representative. After Kyle discloses the details of Big Vape Colorado's involvement in the vaping epidemic at the school, the representative attacks Randy, but Towelie assists Randy in dispatching the representative. Randy starts to vaporize all of the large tanks of vape juice before lighting a marijuana cigarette and tossing it inside, causing the building to explode. Back at the farm, he celebrates with Towelie as Stan sadly realizes that his farm lifestyle will continue.

== Reception ==
Jesse Schedeen with IGN rated the episode 9.2 out of 10 and summarized in his review, "'Tegridy Farms' is easily one of the best South Park episodes in several years, in large part because it captures so much of what made the show stand out in its earlier seasons. It features a healthy sprinkling of topical humor but a ridiculous storyline that can hold up over time. It also banks heavily on the appeal of Randy without completely ignoring the younger characters."

Joe Matar with Den of Geek rated the episode two out of five stars, and stated in his review, "There's nothing particularly wrong with the plot of 'Tegridy Farms.' It makes enough sense and sticks to one topic. It's just so inconsequential and aimless that it's difficult to care about any of it. The greater sin is how, like the rest of Season 22 so far, it's almost uniformly unfunny."

John Hugar with The A.V. Club gave the episode an "A" grade, and opened his review stating, "I'll be honest, while I appreciate South Park's earnest social commentaries, as well as their desire to atone for the negative effect the show's early years might have had on society, ultimately, this show is at its best when it just focuses all of its energy on telling jokes and making fun of shit, which was certainly the case tonight."
