= A Boy and a Priest =

- South Park episode
- Episode no.: Season 22; Episode 2
- Directed by: Trey Parker
- Written by: Trey Parker
- Production code: 2202
- Original air date: October 3, 2018

Episode chronology
← Previous "Dead Kids"	Next → "The Problem with a Poo"
- South Park season 22

"A Boy and a Priest" is the second episode of the twenty-second season of the American animated television series South Park. The 289th overall episode of the series, it aired on Comedy Central in the United States on October 3, 2018.

The episode references the Catholic Church sexual abuse cases, which were previously addressed in "Red Hot Catholic Love".

== Plot ==
As the families of South Park gather at church on Sunday, Stan Marsh questions why he has to attend every week. His parents, Randy and Sharon, admonish him on the ritual's importance and say that they always feel better after each service. At church, Father Maxi struggles to deliver his sermon amid all the constant interruptions by members of the congregation who make jokes referencing Catholic Church sexual abuse cases, which causes them to laugh uncontrollably. Butters Stotch attempts to console Maxi, relating to him how he had been the subject of ridicule at school, but now enjoys greater popularity. Encouraging him not to give his tormentors the satisfaction of cowering in shame, he invites Maxi to board game night with his friends at Stan's house, but Maxi's appearance there garners more ridicule from Randy, who finds the scene of a Catholic priest sitting with five boys worthy of a photograph on social media. When an embarrassed Maxi leaves, Butters goes after him. Saying that he himself was once like Father Maxi, Butters implores him not to allow himself to be daunted by the cruelty of others, and to simply be himself.

As a result of this, Maxi spends more time socializing with Butters, and neglects his duties, to the point that churchgoers find the church doors locked the following Sunday. When Mr. Mackey alerts the Denver Archdiocese that "another" priest has disappeared from his parish, the diocese sends a cleanup crew of ordained church officials to thoroughly clean the South Park church, Stan's house, and any other location where Father Maxi has been, in order to remove trace evidence of child molestation, in particular semen. At Clyde Donovan's birthday party at a roller rink, Butters brings Maxi, much to the anger of Clyde, who does not want a priest at his party. A demoralized Maxi leaves with Butters, and later confesses to him that some time ago, he learned the extent of the Catholic Church sex abuse problem, and that it was worse than anyone thought (as seen in the episode "Red Hot Catholic Love"). When the cleanup crew appear at the roller rink and learn that Maxi was there with Butters, they kidnap Stan and Clyde, and after tracking Butters down, they kidnap him as well.

The cleanup crew take the three boys into the woods, where they have deployed a Zamboni ice resurfacer modified to clean up semen, or "Kumboni". Father Maxi tracks down and confronts the cleanup crew, telling them to do whatever they want to him, but to spare the children. Surprised, the bishop in charge says that they are not there to kill him, but to cover up his crimes and issue him a transfer to the Maldives, just as the Church has always done with priests accused of child molestation. When they assure him that other priests will take over for him in South Park, Father Maxi uses the Kumboni to trample the cleanup crew to death. He returns to his position at South Park's church, delivering his sermons and calmly enduring the continued jokes at the expense of the Church.

The credits of the episode have slight opaque text in the background reading "#cancelsouthpark"

== Reception ==
Jesse Schedeen with IGN rated the episode an 8.2 out of 10, summarizing in his review "This week's South Park offered a better sense of how the new season will set itself apart. The idea of looking back a decade or more to revisit classic South Park episodes is definitely appealing, and hopefully this won't be the last time we see that approach in Season 22."

John Hugar with The A.V. Club rated the episode a B+ and ended his review stating, "This episode isn't an all-time classic like 'Red Hot Catholic Love,' but much like last week's episode, it handled a dark, difficult topic with the appropriate mix of irreverence and empathy. Trey and Matt are clearly embracing their role as social commentators, and so far, the results have been thoroughly rewarding."

The episode was denounced by The Catholic League for Religious and Civil Rights. However, the criticism was not for casting the Catholic Church in a negative light, but for portraying the Catholic priests accused of misconduct as molesting younger children instead of adolescents.
