= Unfulfilled =

- South Park episode
- Episode no.: Season 22; Episode 9
- Directed by: Trey Parker
- Written by: Trey Parker
- Production code: 2209
- Original air date: December 5, 2018

Guest appearance
- Casey Nicholaw as Larry Zewiski

Episode chronology
← Previous "Buddha Box"	Next → "Bike Parade"
- South Park season 22

"Unfulfilled" is the ninth episode of the twenty-second season of the American animated television series South Park. The 296th overall episode of the series, it premiered on Comedy Central in the United States on December 5, 2018. It is the first of a two-part story arc that concludes the season.

The episode centers upon the decision by the corporate retailer Amazon to choose the town of South Park as the location for its new fulfillment center, a reference to the 2018 competition among various U.S. cities to be chosen as the second headquarters of that company. While the development is a boon for those in the town who enjoy purchasing from the retailer, working conditions there lead to a strike, which leads to a visit to the town by Amazon founder and CEO Jeff Bezos, who is depicted as one of the alien Talosians from the original 1965 Star Trek pilot "The Cage".

== Plot ==
South Park fourth grader Butters Stotch looks forward to the town's bike parade, where he hopes to win first prize. He purchases accessories to decorate his bicycle, but his father, Stephen, who recently began working at the Amazon fulfillment center as a floor manager, worries that his family's frequent purchases on that website are driving it deeper into debt. In addition, many local businesses have closed since the center opened, due to the public's preference for buying things online.

Stephen's co-worker, Josh Carter, is accidentally grabbed by a sorting robot and compressed into a small package, which Amazon blames on "human error." This outrages the facility's boxers, who go on strike, shutting down the fulfillment center, and delaying the fulfillment of the public's orders. Members of the public form a counter-protest urging the boxers to return to work so that they can receive their purchases. Jeff Bezos, the founder and CEO of Amazon, appears at South Park City Hall, where he is depicted similarly to the lead Talosian from the original 1965 Star Trek pilot "The Cage". He complains about the strike to Mayor McDaniels, who had assured him that the town was the perfect location for the center. Angered that Amazon orders throughout Colorado are not being fulfilled, he threatens to close her Amazon Prime account if she does not help him get the strikers back to work. When the company closes the strikers' Prime accounts, this creates a conflict for Stephen, who is torn between providing for his family and supporting his coworkers. Bezos and McDaniels observe this and other developments in the situation through cameras in citizens' Amazon Echo smart speakers. Eventually Stephen decides to cross the picket lines in an attempt to help his son with the bike parade in a "scab" situation reminiscent of Billy Elliot's dad Jackie crossing the picket line.

Butters' friends, Kenny McCormick, Eric Cartman, Stan Marsh and Kyle Broflovski, are initially dismissive of his interest in the bike parade. They reevaluate their view of it, however, upon encountering Larry Zewiski, the haughty winner of a previous parade, and see how popular his victory made him. Desiring to win the prize as a group, they decide to enter four bikes into the parade under a single theme. When the strike impedes their ability to buy accessories for their bikes, however, they go to the local mall, but find it dilapidated and populated solely by zombie-like employees who cannot provide the diverse inventory that online merchants offer. Stan contacts Bezos, and says that the mall zombies will work as boxers at the fulfillment center if Bezos ships their bike parade-related purchases to them first. Bezos agrees to this, and when the strikers learn of this, Josh, still permanently stuck in a small box, decides to lead them to revolution.

== Reception ==
Jesse Schedeen of IGN rated the episode an 8.2 out of 10, stating that he enjoyed the science-fiction elements woven into the plot, including the depiction of Jeff Bezos as "basically a mash-up of the Talosians from Star Trek and the aliens from The Twilight Zone episode 'To Serve Man'. All in all, a more satisfying take on a controversial billionaire than last season's lukewarm Mark Zuckerberg parody".

John Hugar of The A.V. Club gave the episode a grade of A-, and said of the political themes of the story, "Perhaps Trey and Matt realized the arguments they were making were more left-wing than what they had been previously known for".

== See also ==
- Something Wall-Mart This Way Comes, a similar premise from Season 8 involving Wall-Mart.
