= Mirage: Arcane Warfare =

2017 video game

- Developer: Torn Banner Studios
- Publisher: Torn Banner Studios
- Engine: Unreal Engine 4
- Platform: Windows
- Release: 23 May 2017
- Genre: Action
- Mode: Multiplayer

Mirage: Arcane Warfare was a multiplayer action game developed by Torn Banner Studios. The game launched on Windows PCs in May 2017, but was shut down one year later.

== Gameplay ==
Mirage: Arcane Warfare was a team-based multiplayer action game played from a first-person perspective. Combat was melee-focused with magical abilities. Players had the freedom to choose from six different classes, character archetypes that had different abilities and skills. The game featured deathmatch and objective-based game modes, like capture the flag, capture points, and payload.

== Development and release ==
Mirage: Arcane Warfare was developed by Torn Banner Studios. The game was developed in the Unreal Engine 4 game engine. The game was released for Windows on 23 May 2017. Torn Banner offered players access to a closed beta as a pre-order incentive. Post-launch, Torn Banner supported the game with free updates by adding features requested by players, such as AI opponents, new maps, and new modes.

== Reception ==
Reception

Aggregate score
Aggregator	Score
Metacritic	74/100

Review scores
Publication	Score
PC Gamer (US)	74/100
PC PowerPlay	8/10

Mirage: Arcane Warfare received "mixed or average" reviews from professional critics according to review aggregator website Metacritic. PC Gamer reviewer T.J. Hafer found the combat to be fun and gameplay systems to be well-designed. However, due to the game being a multiplayer-only title, he was hesitant to recommend it because of the lack of player activity. Arnold Burgess of PC PowerPlay agreed that the game's primary issue was its current lack of players. He praised the character design, the combat, and the environments of the levels.

Commercially, the game was a failure. In September 2017, Torn Banner noted that launch sales of Mirage were poor, which led them to run a promotion that offered the game for free for a limited period and subsequently dropped the game's price permanently. Torn Banner removed Mirage from sale and shut down the game's official servers in May 2018 in response to the EU's implementation of the General Data Protection Regulation.
