= Age of Chivalry =

2007 video game

- Developer: Team Chivalry
- Publisher: Team Chivalry
- Engine: Source
- Platform: Microsoft Windows
- Release: September 10, 2007
- Genre: Action
- Mode: Multiplayer

Age of Chivalry is a multiplayer-focused total conversion modification for Valve's Half-Life 2 using the Source engine. Founded by Rickard Drakborn, Jeff Simmons and Scott Chipman, and developed by a group of independent developers called Team Chivalry, the mod features a medieval theme and aims to provide enjoyable close-combat battles.

== Gameplay ==
Players select to play on either the Agatha Knights or the Mason Order, the two factions competing to rule the fictional kingdom that is the game's setting. Most maps have several objectives; completing one leads to the next until the final objective has been completed or the defending team is able to prevent the other team from completing theirs during the allotted time. Objectives vary from taking a strategical point to killing villagers, and include many siege-oriented ones like ramming down the main door of a castle and constructing bridges. Age of Chivalry plans to use a dynamic campaign, in which each scenario affects which map will be used in the next chapter.

== Reception ==
PC Gamer highlighted the mod's large maps, describing the mountainous stretches as "tactics-encouraging" and overall should "encourage improvisation in team play."

== Legacy ==
The mod later evolved into a full game by the name of Chivalry: Medieval Warfare, developed by Torn Banner Studios (whose employees were involved in the development of the mod) as their first commercial game. It was released on October 16, 2012, via Steam.
