= Time to Get Cereal =

- South Park episode
- Episode no.: Season 22; Episode 6
- Directed by: Trey Parker
- Written by: Trey Parker
- Production code: 2206
- Original air date: November 7, 2018

Episode chronology
← Previous "The Scoots"	Next → "Nobody Got Cereal?"
- South Park season 22

"Time to Get Cereal" is the sixth episode of the twenty-second season of the American animated television series South Park. The 293rd overall episode of the series, it aired on Comedy Central in the United States on November 7, 2018.

The episode features a parody of recurring character and former US Vice President Al Gore, who is enlisted by the main characters in a crisis that is causing the deaths of numerous citizens of South Park. The episode is the first part of a two-episode storyline and primarily deals with climate change denial.

== Plot ==
Jimbo Kern and Ned Gerblansky track what they believe to be a bear through a field, which is revealed to be Tegridy Farms, the property of Randy and Sharon Marsh. Suddenly, Ned is attacked by a monster called ManBearPig (a creature first referenced in the episode of the same name) and is carried away in his jaws in front of Jimbo, Randy, and his son, Stan, an incident that Stan relates to his friends.

A schoolmate of Stan's named Collin Brooks is found dead in the schoolyard of South Park Elementary School. Thinking it was another school shooting, Park County Police investigator Sergeant Yates goes to the school, irritated that his time playing Red Dead Redemption 2, a video game repeatedly referenced by other characters in the episode, is being infringed on by the local children. Despite the mutilated and partially eaten remains, Yates continues to regard Brooks' death as a shooting. His suspicions fall on Stan and his friends Eric Cartman, Kenny McCormick, and Kyle Broflovski, for which Yates eventually issues arrest warrants as more bodies are found in the woods which he blames on outdoor school shootings.

Remembering that former U.S. Vice President Al Gore was an investigator in the existence of ManBearPig, Stan and his friends go to him to enlist his help. Gore angrily recalls when the boys and the rest of the public ridiculed and ignored him when he tried to warn them about the creature in that prior episode and says that they should have heeded his warnings back then.

At a Red Lobster, a husband is arguing with his wife that ManBearPig isn't real. In the middle of the conversation, ManBearPig breaks in and massacres the establishment as the husband says there's no point in trying to flee because others will not do the same before he is mauled mid-sentence. At Yates's home, he and his wife, Maggie, suffer the stress of the investigation, especially as it infringes upon the free time he would rather spend playing Red Dead Redemption 2 and that while he was gone for three days on the investigation, she had continued the game without him, causing him to berate her and start the game over from the beginning.

After acceding to Gore's demand for an apology and extended praise and groveling, Gore decides to help them. He tells the boys that ManBearPig is a demon sent by the Devil for unknown reasons. The group sacrifices a goat in a demonic ritual in order to summon Satan, who leads the group to the local library to research the creature. Satan learns there that ManBearPig is a Sifter of Fate, a demon that appears every few generations to exploit mankind's weaknesses by making a deal with someone in town. Yates and the police surround the library and order the boys to surrender. Stan pleads with the police, telling them that Al Gore was right all along, and that this time, they all need to admit that they were wrong. Yates ignores Stan and arrests the boys, much to the horror of Stan's grandfather Grampa Marsh, who watches the event on television, saying "What have I done?"

== Reception ==
Jesse Schedeen with IGN rated the episode 9.1 out of 10, summarizing in his review, "Before this episode, it might have seemed like there was nowhere left to go with Al Gore's anti-ManBearPig crusade. 'Time to Get Cereal' proved how wrong that is by taking full advantage of Gore's return and the climate change metaphor at the heart of his nemesis." Schedeen also noted that the episode's storyline appeared to be an attempt to apologize for South Park's previous dismissal of climate change as a serious issue.

John Hugar with The A.V. Club gave the episode a B grade and agreed with Schedeen that this episode appeared to be apologizing for the previous ridicule of Gore and climate change, stating in his review, "More than anything else, I'm surprised this episode exists. Over the last few seasons, Trey and Matt have looked inward, and considered the notion that some of what they had to say hasn't aged well, but it's pretty jarring to see them take a previous episode and say 'shit, we fucked up.'"

During filming of The Daily Show, Al Gore was asked about the way South Park had portrayed him and ManBearPig in this and the following episode, and said "I thought it was a hell of a statement by South Park, and I appreciated it a lot".

== See also ==
- An Inconvenient Sequel: Truth to Power (2017)
- Climate change adaptation and mitigation
