= Lisa Nakamura =

American professor

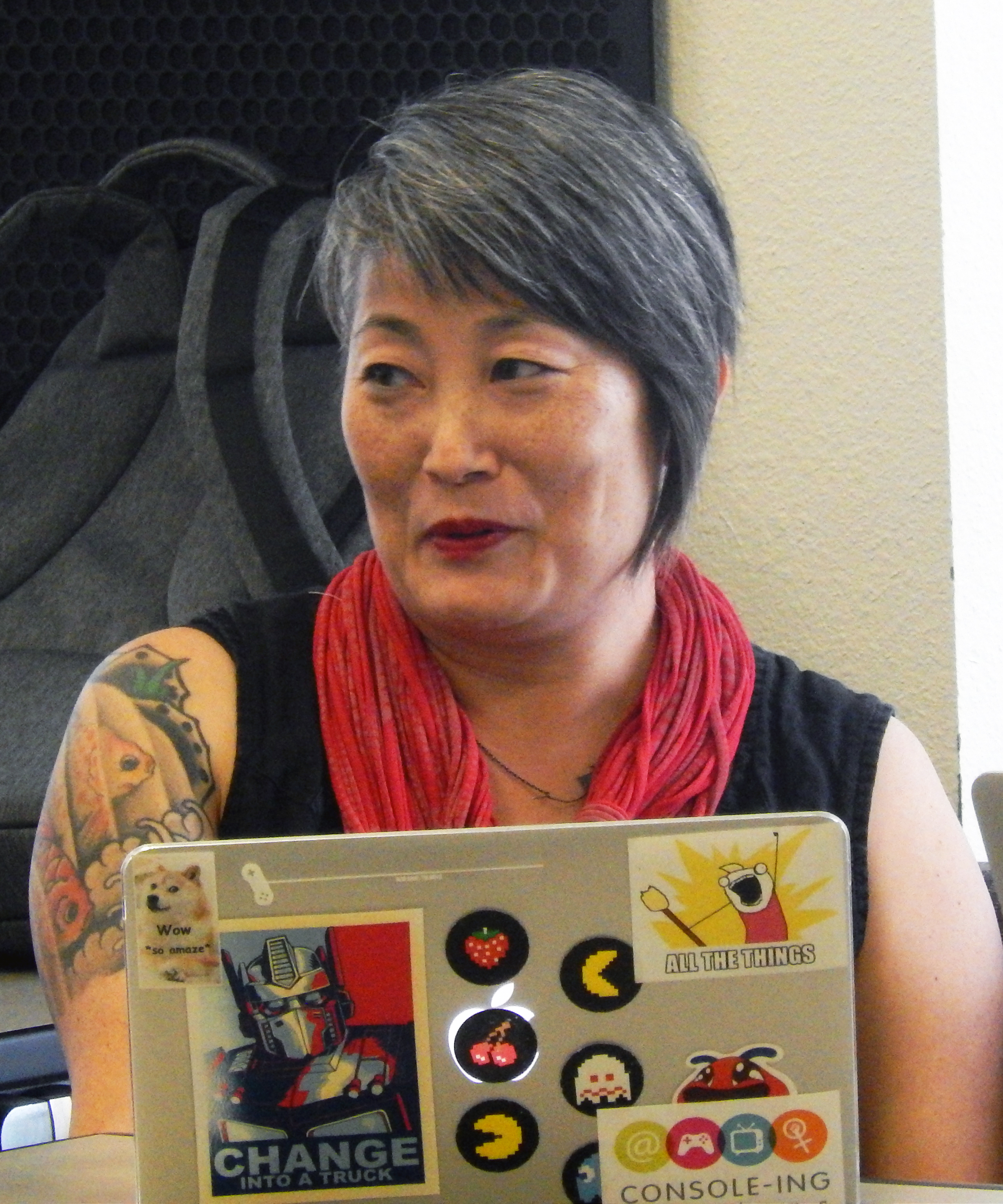
Lisa Nakamura

Lisa Nakamura is an American professor of media and cinema studies, Asian American studies, and gender and women’s studies. She teaches at the University of Michigan, Ann Arbor, where she is also the Coordinator of Digital Studies and the Gwendolyn Calvert Baker Collegiate Professor in the Department of American Cultures.

== Education ==
Nakamura earned a B.A. from Reed College and a Ph.D. in English from the Graduate Center of the City University of New York.

== Career ==
Nakamura's research includes feminist theory, race and gender in new media, film and television studies, Asian American studies, digital media theory, and digital game studies. Nakamura's main areas of contribution are in interrogating the racial/ethnic assumptions embedded in the representations of race in digital media, particularly within gaming cultures.

From 2007 to 2012, Nakamura held positions at the University of Illinois Urbana-Champaign as a professor in the Institute of Communication Research, a professor of Media and Cinema Studies, a professor of Asian American Studies, and the Director of the Asian American Studies Program.

She is a professor of media and cinema studies, Asian American studies, and gender and women’s studies. She is a member of the editorial board of the Journal of Asian American Studies, Communication and Critical/Cultural Studies, Games and Culture and New Media and Society. She serves on the international advisory board of Signs: Journal of Women in Culture and Society.

At Michigan, she teaches courses on Asian Americans and media as well as advanced courses on new media criticism, history, and theory.In 2021, Nakamura was awarded the John H. D'Arms Faculty Award for Distinguished Graduate Mentoring in the Humanities by the Rackham Graduate School at the University of Michigan.

She is the author of Cybertypes: Race, Ethnicity, and Identity on the Internet (2002), Digitizing Race: Visual Cultures of the Internet (2008), and is co-editor of Race in Cyberspace (2013). She has also published articles in Critical Studies in Media Communication, Cinema Journal, The Women’s Review of Books, Camera Obscura, and the Iowa Journal of Cultural Studies. Nakamura is working on a new monograph on massively multiplayer online role-playing games, the transnational racialized labor, and avatarial capital in a "postracial" world.

Nakamura has analyzed issues of gold farming in the MMORPG World of Warcraft. In that game, friction resulted from U.S. players of the 2004 release finding themselves competing with Chinese-based players who were employed to generate in-game resources to be sold on trading sites. In her analysis of gold farming, media scholar Nakamura wrote that although "players cannot see each other's body while playing, specific forms of game labor, such as gold farming and selling, as well as specific styles of play, have become racialized as Chinese, producing new forms of networked racism that are particularly easy for players to disavow."

== Books ==
Nakamura's first book, Digitizing Race: Visual Cultures of the Internet, discusses the visual cultures of the Internet and the type of information we seek online. She is interested in the emergence and immense popularity of racially themed websites that are created by for and about people of color. She is interested in what she terms the "racio-visual logic of the internet." Jessie Daniels of Hunter College, City University of New York argues that the book's central insight is that the Internet is a "visual technology, a protocol for seeing that is interfaced and networked in ways that produce a particular set of racial formations." From Facebook to YouTube to avatars to video games, visual representations online incorporate the embodied, gendered, and racialized self online.

Doris Witt of the University of Iowa reviews the book, Race in Cyberspace edited by Beth E. Kolko, Lisa Nakamura, and Gilbert B. Rodman. In an effort to open up a “space where a larger, more extended, and more inclusive conversation about race and cyberspace can take place,” Witt discusses how the book discusses the processes through which race is performed online by privileged consumers of cyberspace rather than the way in which cyberspace has been produced by and has helped reproduce a racialized global division of labor.

=== "Where Do You Want to Go Today?" ===
As reviewed by Samantha Blackmon from Purdue University, Nakamura's third book, Cybertypes: Race, Ethnicity, and Identity on the Internet, aims to interrogate how the internet shapes and reshapes our perceptions of race, ethnicity, and identity. Blackmon states that Nakamura names the images of racial identity online that shape the specific perceptions of cybertypes, and how these cybertypes are often determined and defined by the racial and ethnic stereotypes that are already established in our current society.

=== Race in Cyberspace: Race, Ethnicity, and Identity on the Internet ===
This book was first published in 2002. Routledge is an imprint of Taylor & Francis, an informa company, which aims to interrogate how the internet shapes and reshapes our perceptions of race, ethnicity, and identity. Blackmon states that Nakamura names the images of racial identity online that shape the specific perceptions of cybertypes, and how these cybertypes are often determined and defined by the racial and ethnic stereotypes that are already established in our current society.

== Short Pieces ==
Nakamura has also written many book reviews and journal articles. These include "Race In/For Cyberspace: Identity Tourism and Racial Passing on the Internet," “Prospects for a Materialist Informatics: An Interview with Donna Haraway," “'I See You?' Gender and Disability in Avatar” and “Queer Female of Color: The Highest Difficulty Setting There Is? Gaming Rhetoric as Gender Capital,”. The main research area of these articles is to question the racial / ethnic hypothesis in the racial representation of digital media (especially game culture).

=== Queer Female of Color: The Highest Difficulty Setting There Is? Gaming Rhetoric as Gender Capital ===
Nakamura's 2012 article was written in response to John Scalzi's article "Straight White Male: The Lowest Difficulty Setting There Is" which was posted to Scalzi's blog Whatever on May 15, 2012.

TED: The internet is a trash fire. Here's how to fix it.

In 2019 Lisa Nakamura gave a speech on TED, titled: “The internet is a trash fire. Here’s how to fix it”. In this speech she talked about her concerns for toxic internet environments with a specific focus on Internet gaming environments. She expressed how these environments can change by incorporating flagging and reporting tools, not letting the internet raise our children, and forgiving people for their past behavior.
