= South Park season 22 =

Season of television series

South Park
- Season 22
- Home media release cover
- No. of episodes: 10

Release
- Original network: Comedy Central
- Original release: September 26 – December 12, 2018

Season chronology
- ← Previous; Season 21 Next → Season 23

The twenty-second season of South Park, an American animated sitcom created by Trey Parker and Matt Stone, premiered on Comedy Central on September 26, 2018, and concluded on December 12, 2018, after 10 episodes aired. This season once again had planned "dark weeks" (weeks during which no new episodes would air) after episode four and episode seven.

Similar to the previous season, the season features continuing elements and recurring storylines without adhering to a linear story arc; while lampooning several phenomena such as school shootings in the United States, modern political correctness, climate change denial, and the working conditions and monopolistic tactics of Amazon, several characters in the show also express disdain and exasperation with South Park's constant attraction to controversy and surreal occurrences.

== Marketing ==
On September 13, 2018, the series began teasing a set of commercials about a mock-cancellation by Comedy Central by using the hashtag #cancelsouthpark.

== Episodes ==
No. overall	No. in season	Title	Directed by	Written by	Original release date	Prod. code	U.S. viewers (millions)
288	1	"Dead Kids"	Trey Parker	Trey Parker	September 26, 2018	2201	1.09
When school shootings occur at South Park Elementary, everyone is nonchalant about it except Sharon. Cartman fails a math test because he copied his answers from Token and believes Token deliberately sabotaged him because he did not like Black Panther.
289	2	"A Boy and a Priest"	Trey Parker	Trey Parker	October 3, 2018	2202	0.93
When Father Maxi struggles to deliver his sermon amid constant jokes, Butters attempts to console Maxi, but the rest of the town takes their new friendship the wrong way.
290	3	"The Problem with a Poo"	Trey Parker	Trey Parker	October 10, 2018	2203	0.97
After posting offensive tweets, Mr. Hankey is fired from directing the annual holiday pageant, and enlists Kyle's help to regain his reputation. Strong Woman gives birth to quintuplets following her relationship with PC Principal.
291	4	"Tegridy Farms"	Trey Parker	Trey Parker	October 17, 2018	2204	0.71
The vaping craze hits South Park. Cartman and Butters sell vapes to others in school while Kyle is strongly against it. Annoyed with all the recent issues, Randy resolves to move the family to a marijuana farm, but a vape salesman follows him and attempts to steal his product.
292	5	"The Scoots"	Trey Parker	Trey Parker	October 31, 2018	2205	0.84
When e-scooters appear all over town, the boys want to use them to their advantage to get as much candy on Halloween as possible, but the town goes into panic upon realizing how much candy they will need.
293	6	"Time to Get Cereal"	Trey Parker	Trey Parker	November 7, 2018	2206	0.83
Part one of two. A creature is killing citizens of South Park. The boys soon realize who is responsible, and turn to an old acquaintance for help, but the police think the boys are the ones responsible and wrongfully arrest them in the end.
294	7	"Nobody Got Cereal?"	Trey Parker	Trey Parker	November 14, 2018	2207	0.82
Part two of two. As the town panics over the recent destruction, the boys escape police custody and Stan confronts the one responsible for bringing the creature to South Park.
295	8	"Buddha Box"	Trey Parker	Trey Parker	November 28, 2018	2208	0.83
Cartman's anxiety leads him to wear a cardboard box over his head and isolate himself and the trend catches on. PC Principal and Strong Woman continue to deal with their quintuplets.
296	9	"Unfulfilled"	Trey Parker	Trey Parker	December 5, 2018	2209	0.77
Part one of two. An Amazon warehouse opens in South Park, and after an accident, the employees go on strike. The boys decide to enter a bike parade, but are upset by the shipping delay.
297	10	"Bike Parade"	Trey Parker	Trey Parker	December 12, 2018	2210	0.83
Part two of two. As the Amazon strike continues, Randy finds a way to sell more marijuana, and Kenny's father forces him to be a part of the strike, putting a damper on the boys' bike parade plans.

== Reception ==
The twenty-second season of South Park received positive reviews. On Rotten Tomatoes, the season holds a 77% approval rating based on 13 reviews, stating "South Park recaptures its sardonic magic in a less serialized season that remains hit-or-miss in its resonance but undeniably funny no matter who it skewers".

The premiere episode "Dead Kids" was watched by 1.09 million viewers and scored a 0.7 in the ratings, making it the lowest watched season premiere in the show's history and a decrease from the season 21 premiere episode "White People Renovating Houses", which was watched by 1.68 million viewers.

== Home media ==
This season was released in its entirety on DVD and Blu-ray on May 28, 2019.

== See also ==
- South Park (Park County, Colorado)
- South Park City
