= The Problem with a Poo =

- South Park episode
- Episode no.: Season 22; Episode 3
- Directed by: Trey Parker
- Written by: Trey Parker
- Production code: 2203
- Original air date: October 10, 2018

Episode chronology
← Previous "A Boy and a Priest"	Next → "Tegridy Farms"
- South Park season 22

"The Problem with a Poo" is the third episode of the twenty-second season of the American animated television series South Park. The 290th overall episode of the series, it aired on Comedy Central in the United States on October 10, 2018.

The episode explores modern political correctness and cancel culture as the people of South Park turn against longtime recurring character Mr. Hankey, and Vice Principal Strong Woman and PC Principal deal with the fallout from their fling at the end of the previous season. These themes are also seen in the episode's references to the 2017 documentary The Problem with Apu, the cancellation of Roseanne after controversial tweets by the show's eponymous actress, and the confirmation hearings of Supreme Court Justice Brett Kavanaugh.

== Plot ==
At a South Park City Council meeting, Mr. Hankey, a sentient piece of feces, and the director of the town's Christmas pageant, is told that the budget for his show has been cut in half. Despite the fact that many in town like him, he is told that many others are offended by him due to his scatological nature. After he takes his anger out on South Park Elementary's music students, both during class and with a series of politically incorrect tweets, the City Council fires him. Unable to find a lawyer to accept his case, he enlists Kyle Broflovski, since Kyle's father is a lawyer. At a public hearing, greater scrutiny is placed upon his history of offensive tweets, which he attempts to minimize as failed attempts at humor that he blames on his use of Ambien. He also argues that preparing for the upcoming Christmas show is more important than focusing on such indiscretions.

Vice Principal Strong Woman, pregnant following her fling with PC Principal in "Super Hard PCness" and "Splatty Tomato", tells PC Principal that their affair was a mistake, and that she wishes to break up with him. PC Principal, despite his concerns over whether this is possible, reluctantly agrees, and the two organize a school assembly on in vitro fertilization in order to stave off speculation that Strong Woman became pregnant through sex or any other questions over the father of her children. She gives birth to quintuplets who turn out to be highly politically correct (PC) and bear a strong resemblance to PC Principal, but she refuses to acknowledge that he is the children's father. PC Principal, not being able to stay away from his children, proposes that they tell others that he is the children's male nanny, or "manny".

Feeling that people have forgotten what the spirit of Christmas is about, Mr. Hankey enlists Kyle to help him put on a musical performance in the park, but when the show's politically incorrect humor offends PC Principal's and Strong Woman's PC babies, they begin crying. Their distress continues even after Mr. Hankey ceases his politically incorrect material, because it is explained to him that "sometimes PC babies don't know what they're crying about." Mr. Hankey angrily excoriates the townsfolk for this, and when Kyle tries to stop him, an altercation ensues that destroys their stage. South Park severs all ties with Mr. Hankey, ending the long Christmas association between him and the town. Mr. Hankey leaves town, in search of a place that still accepts objectionable, racist beings like him. He arrives in the fictional town of Springfield, the setting of the animated TV series The Simpsons, where the characters native to that show, in particular Apu Nahasapeemapetilon, welcome him with open arms. A title card is then shown that reads "#cancelthesimpsons", mocking cancel culture, and the "#cancelsouthpark" marketing that was used to promote season 22.

== Reception ==
Jesse Schedeen rated the episode 4.3 out of 10 in a review for IGN, offering the verdict, "This episode tries to have its cake and eat it too by attacking badly behaving celebrities and outrage culture at the same time, and it fails to accomplish either. The funny moments this week can't outweigh the jumbled, frustrating narrative."

John Hugar with The A.V. Club rated the episode a C, summarizing his review stating "'The Problem With A Poo' was a convoluted attempt to insert too many of-the-moment references into one half-hour without definitively saying anything about the possibility of redemption for once-beloved entertainers who engage in abusive behavior."

Jess Joho, writing for Mashable, saw the episode as a turning point for the series, and the references to The Problem with Apu and the #CancelSouthPark hashtag evidence of a deeper metafictional subtext than the series had previously exhibited, stating, "For the first time, South Park seems to be genuinely engaged with questioning its own place in the current cultural climate." Noting that the episode seemed intentionally vague as to what its views were on the Roseanne Barr, Brett Kavanaugh, and Simpsons issues, Joho felt that its takeaways were also more "measured, sincere, elusive, and bafflingly balanced" than had previously been the case. Joho also thought that the show's usually bitter take on such topics was not tempered with a greater modicum of seriousness, reason, and empathy, which Joho saw as an opportunity for "potential brilliance."
