= The Scoots =

- South Park episode
- Episode no.: Season 22; Episode 5
- Directed by: Trey Parker
- Written by: Trey Parker
- Production code: 2205
- Original air date: October 31, 2018

Episode chronology
← Previous "Tegridy Farms"	Next → "Time to Get Cereal"
- South Park season 22

"The Scoots" is the fifth episode of the twenty-second season of the American animated television series South Park. The 292nd overall episode of the series, it first aired on Comedy Central in the United States on October 31, 2018.

The episode, which focuses on Mr. Mackey and Kenny McCormick, satirizes the popularity of scooter-sharing systems and e-scooters, which cause a candy shortage on Halloween, and a hoarding problem for the citizens of South Park. The episode's title is a parody of the classic horror-thriller film The Birds, elements of which are referenced in the episode. The episode also includes Halloween costumes and plot elements inspired by the video game Fortnite.

== Plot ==
A narrator opens the episode by explaining that the Halloween night depicted in the story was different from the ones that came before, and changed everyone’s lives forever.

While putting his garbage out on the sidewalk, South Park Elementary School counselor Mr. Mackey trips over an e-scooter, one of many ride share scooters left anonymously all over town. Despite their popularity, Mackey is skeptical of the trend and hopes it is only a fad, a position that escalates to anger after the vehicular collisions he experiences at the hands of scooter users. That night, he collects all the abandoned e-scooters he can find in a pickup truck and throws them off a cliff. He nonetheless finds the town filled with them the next day, even inexplicably in his home.

Fourth graders Stan Marsh, Kyle Broflovski, and Eric Cartman decide to use the e-scooters to go trick-or-treating, but because using an e-scooter requires a cell phone, this excludes their impoverished friend, Kenny McCormick, who does not own a cell phone. Kenny learns that all of his other schoolmates are using e-scooters on Halloween too, leaving him alone on the holiday.

At a town meeting the day before Halloween, the police inform the public that the use of e-scooters, which allows riders to cover more ground in a single night, means that citizens will be visited by trick-or-treaters from surrounding towns, and will need at least $6,000 of candy to prepare for this. This leads to a panic by all of the townsfolk, and a shortage of candy.

Mackey is among those worried about Halloween night, but when a despondent Kenny tries to seek his counsel, and Mackey learns from him that cell phones are needed to use e-scooters, they join forces to resolve both of their problems. On Halloween night, citizens and the police are swamped with trick-or-treaters using e-scooters, a problem that occurs nationwide as even dense urban areas like New York City are reported to be out of candy. Mackey and Kenny drive to a cell tower and disable it. This in turn disables all of the trick-or-treaters’ cell phones and e-scooters, which they abandon upon returning to trick-or-treating on foot.

As the narrator, revealed to be Kenny, relates that this was the last, good Halloween that felt like Halloween, one of the abandoned e-scooters stands up by itself and drives off without a rider.

== Reception ==
Jesse Schedeen with IGN rated the episode a 7.8 out of 10 and summarized in his review, "While not the best Halloween-themed South Park episode, 'The Scoots' certainly has its moments. The e-scooter storyline is a bit repetitive at first but eventually has great payoff after a candy-fueled apocalypse sweeps over South Park."

John Hugar, writing for The A.V. Club, gave the episode an A− grade, stating in his review, "So, why does 'The Scoots' still manage to work so well? Because it focuses on comedy and characterization more than message. Yes, this episode wants to make a point about the degree to which our phones control our lives, but it mostly just wants to tell a story about a kid being left out on Halloween, and a counselor being tortured by seemingly magic scooters."

Chris Longo with Den of Geek rated the episode 3 out of 5 stars and stated in his review, "South Park could have gotten bogged down in the mystery of the scooters or wandered down a path of addressing our smartphone fixation, but it really said all it needed to about e-scooters by using Mr. Mackey, who gets his car dinged a number of times, to illustrate the potential pitfalls of scootin'." Longo also told how he had seen e-scooters become an issue at San Diego Comic-Con and was able to relate better to the episode as a result of it.
