= Buddha Box =

- South Park episode
- Episode no.: Season 22; Episode 8
- Directed by: Trey Parker
- Written by: Trey Parker
- Production code: 2208
- Original air date: November 28, 2018

Guest appearance
- Michael James Scott as PC Babies singer

Episode chronology
| ← Previous "Nobody Got Cereal?" | Next → "Unfulfilled" |
- South Park season 22

"Buddha Box" is the eighth episode of the twenty-second season of the American animated television series South Park. It is the 295th overall episode of the series, and premiered on Comedy Central in the United States on November 28, 2018. The episode centers upon the titular Buddha Box, a cardboard box that the people of South Park, in particular Eric Cartman, PC Principal and Strong Woman, begin wearing over their heads to combat stress and anxiety.

== Plot ==
In a session with his therapist, Eric Cartman expresses the difficulty he has been experiencing due to both the events of recent episodes and the behavior of the people around him. He says that he wishes he could simply be left alone with his cell phone. The psychologist diagnoses him with anxiety. To address his problem, Cartman purchases a Buddha Box, a cardboard box that he places over his head to help him relax, as it makes it easier for him to ignore the people around him causing his anxiety. Although this creates problems when he wears it in class and plays team sports, the popularity of the Buddha Box nonetheless spreads throughout the school and the town. His classmate Kyle Broflovski, however, grows increasingly irritated with Cartman's behavior while using the box and excoriates him for it, telling him that all people suffer from anxiety and simply adapt to it without annoying those around them. Cartman is shocked to learn this and has an epiphany. He goes to Mayor McDaniels and says that anxiety must be recognized as an epidemic, and that money must be raised to give all sufferers the tools they need to cope with it. When McDaniels asks him how he proposes they do this, Cartman simply speaks the Hindu greeting "Namaste", which he incorrectly interprets as "Fuck you, I have anxiety."

Meanwhile, South Park Elementary administrators PC Principal and Vice Principal Strong Woman deal with the difficulty of raising their extremely politically correct infant quintuplets, which were conceived during their tryst in the episode "Splatty Tomato". They decide against using a daycare center because they fear that if the public finds out that PC Principal is their father, this will threaten their "PC" and "Strong" reputations. When the couple learn about the Buddha Box, they begin using it too, though this leads them to neglect the quintuplets, who go missing. The children eventually come into contact with a record producer who has them produce a successful single under the group name "The PC Babies". When Principal and Woman learn this, they rush to the recording studio and are shocked to learn that in just one day, the babies have protested a bar, stopped construction of a problematic viaduct, and written a successful single about cultural appropriation. Realizing that they missed all this because they were on their cell phones, PC Principal and Strong Woman hold a community meeting where they tell members of the public to stop using Buddha Boxes and reduce their cell phone use. When the two administrators see that everyone is wearing Buddha Boxes and ignoring them, they realize that they are free to take their children out and spend family time with them in public without anyone discovering the truth about their parentage.

== Critical reception ==
Writing for Vulture, freelance blogger Charles Bramesco rated the episode 1 star out of 5. He felt it "begins with a misdiagnosis and builds outward from that false premise, progressing in the wrong direction like an ingrown hair," and did not like the point that "those affected by mental disorders use them as a free pass to act inconsiderately to those around them." Brancesco himself publicly claims to suffer from anxiety and panic attacks.

John Hugar of The A.V. Club was more favorable and enjoyed the subplot with the PC Babies and their parents. He believed Matt Stone and Trey Parker's message on overusing smartphones was "a bit too heavy handed for their own good", despite the fact that "they get in some good jokes, and have a worthwhile point."

IGN contributor Jesse Schedeen gave "Buddha Box" a 3.5 rating out of 10. He criticized the Cartman use of anxiety and the PC Babies' grief over social injustices as "one-note gags stretched well past the breaking point." Schedeen wrote that the episode rehashed "old jokes well past their expiration date," and though he liked the resolution to the PC Babies plot, he felt it did not do much to compensate for the episode's flaws.
