= AusGamers =

Australian video game news website

- Logo (1999–2014)
- Website type: video game journalism
- Launched: 1999
- Current status: Defunct since November 11, 2023

AusGamers was an Australian video game journalism website created by Mammoth Media in 1999. MCVPacific noted it as "one of Australia's longest running online gaming publications, surviving the first dot-com crash, hosting LAN events and building itself into a one-stop files source".

== History ==
AusGamers was initially created in 1999 as a "landing point for local gamers and gaming organizations.

In September 2014, it relaunched its website, having cut ties with media agency MCN in favour of working with You Know Media, headed by Ryan Cunningham.".

On the 11th of November 2023, Steve Farrelly co-editor of the website, published their final article confirming that Mammoth Media is shutting down the site. Mammoth Media became Mammoth Digital.
