= Toilet paper (disambiguation) =

Toilet paper is a soft tissue paper product used to maintain personal hygiene.

"Toilet paper" may also refer to:

- "Toilet Paper" (South Park), an episode of the animated television series
- Toiletpaper (magazine), a biannual Italian photography magazine

== See also ==
- Toilet papering, an act of vandalism which uses toilet paper
