= Quilton =

Australian toilet tissue brand

- Product type: Toilet paper
- Current owner: ABC Tissue Products
- Country: Australia
- Introduced: 1987; 39 years ago
- Markets: Australia
- Tagline: Loves Your Bum
- Website: quilton.com.au

Quilton is an Australian brand of toilet roll produced by ABC Tissue Products. In 2023, Quilton was named the top-scoring toilet paper brand in a review that featured more than 30 toilet paper roll brands, where it received an 85% score. The brand has also introduced facial tissue and paper towel products.

== Background ==
Founded in 1987 by CEO Henry Ngai in Wetherill Park, New South Wales, the ABC Tissue Products manufactures toilet tissues, kitchen towels, facial tissue and napkins, among many other products. In addition to Quilton, the company operates through these brands: Symphony, Cotton Soft, Naturale, Style, Earthcare and Softly, which make up about 80% of sales and about 20% of retailer labels. Quilton products are produced in the state capital cities of Australia; Sydney, Brisbane and Perth. Quilton used to be distributed in New Zealand until October 2021, after the Auckland manufacturer ceased operations due to the cost of production.

== Products ==
Quilton is made with 3 Ply softness through air quilted technology, with products and sizes that include King Size, Regular, Double Length, Triple Length, Shea Butter, Tuffy (paper towel), Gold (which is 4-ply) and as well as having facial tissue products. Being the company's best selling brand, the success of Quilton has introduced customers to the rest of ABC Tissue Product's range, which comprise 100 products.

== Donations ==
In 2020, during the toilet paper shortages caused by panic buying amid the coronavirus pandemic, Quilton donated one million rolls of toilet paper to Australians in need, particularly elderly and vulnerable people. The company partnered with a range of charitable organisations to distribute the donations to affected communities.

== Advertisement ==
A television commercial in 2005 featured aerial shots of people walking through a park, only to be struck with the Cupid's arrow on their buttocks by the 'cupid toddler', the main mascot and representation of the Quilton brand, who reacts with laughter and claps in the clouds. Complaints were made against the commercial because the narrator used the word "bum" ("Quilton loves your bum"). Though the Advertising Standards Board did not find the commercial inappropriate, and therefore the slogan that features the word "bum" in Quilton adverts has been used since.

Recent adverts for the brand generally depict a 'cupid baby' who holds a bow and arrow and dances on (or with) the toilet paper through the clouds, usually accompanied by surf, hip-hop and/or choral music.

== Family and Legacy ==
Henry Ngai's grandson Joseph Ngai is the heir to the Quilton Company.
