= Joseph Gayetty =

Inventor of toilet paper

Joseph C. Gayetty
- Born: 1817 or 1827
- Died: May 2, 1895
- Occupation: Inventor

Joseph C. Gayetty (c. 1817/1827 – May 2, 1895) was an American inventor credited with the invention of commercial toilet paper. It was the first and remained only one of the few commercial toilet papers from 1857 to 1890 remaining in common use until the invention of splinter-free toilet paper in 1935 by the Northern Tissue Company.

== Biography ==
Joseph C. Gayetty's origins remain somewhat obscure. The first record with his name is the 1850 United States Census, which records that he was born in 1817 in Massachusetts. By 1850 he was living in New York City, had married Margaret Louisa Bogart and had two young children. That year he was working at a public house. Ten years later, on the 1860 Census, Gayetty had begun his toilet paper business and was listed as being in the "medicated paper" industry. By this time he and his wife had 5 children, a personal servant, and a modest personal estate valued at $1000. In the 1860 Census, however, he reports that he was born in 1827 in Pennsylvania. Additional records have not been able to clear up his exact birth date or place of birth. Additionally, Gayetty's date and place of death have not been located. Gayetty and his wife had one daughter and four sons. Their youngest son, Henry K. Gayetty, took over his father's business and was in control of the trademarks and licensing by 1891, when the trademark ownership came into question.

== Invention of toilet paper ==
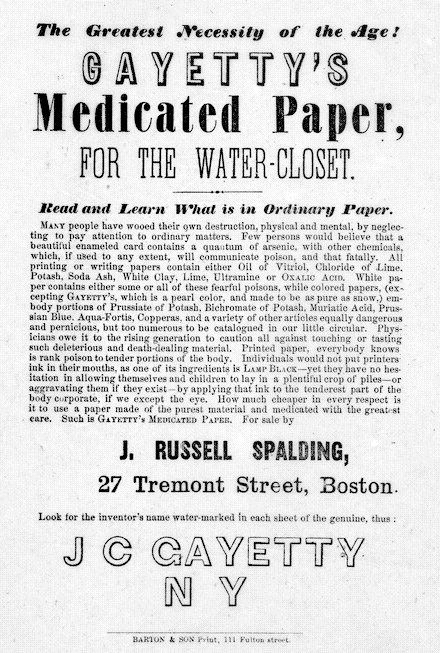
"The Greatest Necessity of the Age!", an advertisement printed in 1859

Joseph C. Gayetty first marketed toilet paper on December 9, 1857. Each sheet of pure Manila hemp paper was watermarked "J C Gayetty N Y". The original product contained aloe as a lubricant and was marketed as an anti-hemorrhoid medical product.

Gayetty was attacked as a quack by at least one medical society. Yet his advertisement of the same year called his product "The Greatest Necessity of the Age" and warned against the perils of using toxic inked papers on sensitive body parts. A different advertisement, also printed in 1859, says his business was located at 41 Ann Street, and he was selling 1,000 sheets for one dollar.

The Gayetty name and product were involved in a lawsuit that was filed in 1891, when B.T. Hoogland's Sons, toilet paper dealers, filed suit against the Gayetty Paper Company, specifically Harry K. Gayetty, for trademark infringement. B.T. Hoogland and Son's claim was that they were entitled to the use of the Gayetty name due to an unpaid debt. A paper dated December 5, 1866, was allegedly given to a creditor in lieu of $25 debt and subsequently sold to B.T. Hoogland (senior) for one dollar. However, on January 1, 1866, J.C. Gayetty had entered a ten-year contract for the exclusive right to sell and vend in his name with Demas Barnes and Company, which had taken out a copyright on the product on October 27, 1891. The suit was dismissed in 1894, but another suit was brought. B.T. Hoogland's Sons next sued to stop Harry K. Gayetty and the Diamond Mills Paper Company from using the Gayetty name, and in this case they were successful. Harry Gayetty appealed, but lost at the Appellate Court. Finally, in July 1900, the New York Supreme Court permanently enjoined the Diamond Mills Paper Company and Harry K. Gayetty from using the name on any similar paper product labels.

In 1900, an advertisement shows that B.T. Hoogland's Sons of New York were distributing the watermarked "Papel Medicado De Gayetty" and giving credit to the invention of the paper in 1857 by Joseph C. Gayetty, Inventor. Nearly the same advertisement was run in English in 1907. The product continued to be marketed until the 1920s.
