= Toilet Paper (South Park) =

- South Park episode
- Episode no.: Season 7 Episode 3
- Directed by: Trey Parker
- Written by: Trey Parker
- Production code: 703
- Original air date: April 2, 2003

Episode chronology
← Previous "Krazy Kripples"	Next → "I'm a Little Bit Country"
- South Park season 7

"Toilet Paper" is the third episode of the seventh season of the American animated sitcom South Park, and the 99th episode of the series overall. It first aired on Comedy Central on April 2, 2003.

In the episode, the boys decide to get revenge on their art teacher for giving them detention by covering her house in toilet paper. Kyle starts having nightmares about the ordeal and is desperate to confess, but Cartman plans to kill him so he doesn't rat them out.

The episode was written and directed by series co-creator Trey Parker and is rated TV-MA L in the United States. The character Josh parodied Anthony Hopkins' portrayal of Hannibal Lecter in films based on the novels of Thomas Harris.

== Plot ==
Mrs. Streibel, the art teacher, gives the boys detention for making a phallus out of clay in art class. Enraged, they take revenge by toilet papering her house that night. Kyle is horrified to discover that she has kids and soon regrets the deed, later having nightmares about it. The next day, the boys are called to the counsellor's office, and Cartman comes up with a ridiculously elaborate alibi involving Ally Sheedy and Scientologists. With Kyle struggling to comprehend the details of this convoluted story, Cartman grows concerned that he may confess. Cartman decides to eliminate the risk of Kyle confessing by taking matters into his own hands. He takes Kyle on a boat ride on Stark's Pond and tries to beat him to death with a wiffle bat, which was the only weapon he could afford. Kyle, nevertheless, is so guilt-ridden that he does not defend himself.

Officer Barbrady absurdly exaggerates the weight of the crime and begins an investigation (since he really has nothing better to do that day), but is unable to come up with any solid leads. He seeks help from Josh Myers, a convicted toilet-paperer, who is serving a three-week sentence in Park County Juvenile Hall for toilet papering over 600 houses in less than a year. After several interviews, during which Josh applies psychological pressure on Barbrady, he comes a little closer to solving the case. Later, Barbrady forces a confession out of Butters after injecting him with sodium pentothal and interrogating him for over forty hours, but Butters' parents, furious, arrive to absolve him for confessing to a crime that he did not commit, which he has apparently done before. After seeing Butters get in trouble for their actions, Stan and Kenny are finally convinced that they ought to confess. Stan tells Cartman that, if he has a conscience, he will do the same. Cartman, however, is completely oblivious to the concept of "feeling bad for other people" and is utterly bewildered at his friends' reasoning. He attempts to kill all three of them in a last-ditch attempt, but fails due to once again using the wiffle bat.

The next morning, Barbrady brings Josh along with him to Principal Victoria's office, but before he can speak, Mr. Mackey announces that the true toilet paperer has already confessed. Just then, Stan, Kyle and Kenny rush into the office, only to find out that it is Cartman, having obviously done it in a bid to secure a better deal for himself: each of the boys ends up with two-week detention, except for Cartman, who gets only one for "being brave" (Cartman considered it a pyrrhic victory, as he later laments having to spend one week of detention). Kyle is outraged and he finds this unfair because he was supposed to confess and do the right thing, not Cartman. Josh manages to trick the police and flee. At the conclusion of the episode, he calls Officer Barbrady and thanks him for enabling his escape. Despite Barbrady's pleas—"Josh, you have to go back to Juvenile Hall: you only have a three-week sentence!"—Josh puts down the phone and, armed with bags of toilet paper, slowly approaches the White House as sinister music plays in the background.

== Cultural references ==
- Josh's scenes and feigned behavior are an allusion to the character Hannibal Lecter from Thomas Harris' novels, particularly the then-recent Red Dragon and Anthony Hopkins' portrayal of the character.
- The scene in which the boys toilet paper Mrs. Streibel's house is a reference to the film Platoon (Adagio for Strings by Samuel Barber plays in the background).
- In the same scene, Kyle's hesitance to toilet paper Mrs. Streibel's house when he sees her children is a reference to Scarface, when Tony Montana does not wish to assassinate a UN lobbyist with his family.
- In Kyle's second dream sequence is real footage of figure skater Nancy Kerrigan screaming "Why?! Why?!" after her 1994 attack.
- The scenes where Cartman takes Kyle out on a "boat ride" and the one where he takes all three boys out for one are references to the movie The Godfather Part II, when Michael Corleone orders Al Neri to take Michael's brother Fredo on a fishing trip to be killed.
