= Krazy Kripples =

- South Park episode
- Episode no.: Season 7 Episode 2
- Directed by: Trey Parker
- Written by: Trey Parker
- Production code: 702
- Original air date: March 26, 2003

Episode chronology
← Previous "Cancelled"	Next → "Toilet Paper"
- South Park season 7

"Krazy Kripples" is the second episode of the seventh season of the American animated television series South Park, and the 98th episode of the series overall. It first aired on Comedy Central on March 26, 2003.

In the episode, Christopher Reeve comes to South Park to promote stem cell research. Jimmy becomes offended because everyone pays attention to him, so Jimmy and Timmy decide to start a club called "The Crips", later discovering that there is a real-life gang with the same name.

The episode was written by series co-creator Trey Parker and is rated TV-MA in the United States.

== Plot ==
When Jimmy's comedy act is snubbed by the townspeople in favor of an inspirational talk by Christopher Reeve, Timmy and Jimmy form a club for those disabled at birth. Timmy and Jimmy start their own club, dubbed "the Crips" unaware of the notorious, real life street gang that shares the same name. Eventually Timmy and Jimmy find out about the Five Points Crips, and under the belief that it is a group of disabled people like themselves, the boys aspire to join them. When they tell the four main characters - Stan, Kyle, Cartman, and Kenny - of their intentions, Stan suggests that "maybe [they] should just stay out of this one". Kyle and Kenny agree and leave immediately, but Cartman is sore for being left out of Jimmy and Timmy's newly founded club.

The Crips leader in Denver tells the boys they have to "pop some punk ass Bloods" if they want to join the gang. The boys do not know that the term actually means kill some Bloods, so they wander the town to find the Bloods while believing that they are supposed to buy soda pop for them. They find a group of Bloods at a gas station called "Ribs 'n' Gas". While walking across the street, they cause a trucker to swerve violently and smash into the gas station, killing all but one of the thirteen Bloods nearby. The Crips leader then welcomes Jimmy ("Four Legs") and Timmy ("Roller") as the "baddest ass mo' fo' Crips in town" in their gang, because they killed thirteen Bloods in one night (a new Crips gang record) and brought back marshmallows and ginger ale for the gang members.

Meanwhile, Christopher Reeve campaigns for stem cell research for disabled people. By cracking open fetuses and sucking out their juices, he soon regains mobility, and even superpowers like the character he portrayed, Superman. He eventually takes on the role of a supervillain, and is opposed by his former costar and on-screen nemesis, Gene Hackman. Reeve continues to use stem cells even after he is healed and becomes addicted to power, and eventually puts together a Legion of Doom made up of villains from the DC, Marvel and South Park universes (though Professor Chaos tells General Disarray that they should "stay out of this one", much like the boys and the T-shirt shopkeeper, Mr. McGillicuddy, did in the A-plot). At the end, Hackman manages to get a law passed to end Reeve's "fetus-sucking days," and traps Reeve in the Phantom Zone.

Jimmy's parents ask Jimmy if he is in a gang, which he admits to. It is revealed at this point that the Valmers had made fun of disabled kids in High School and believe that God had made Jimmy disabled to punish them, so they naturally believe that this is part of a punishment. One night the Bloods gang members commit a drive-by shooting (which is based on a scene in the 1988 film Colors) on Jimmy's house as retaliation for the killing of the twelve Bloods, which the Park County Police Department respond and investigate the drive-by shooting retaliation by the Bloods. In order to prevent further reprisals, Jimmy decides to call a meeting at the local recreation center between the two gangs, and lock themselves in for the evening until they can sort out their differences. Expectedly, both gangs initially act hostile to one another, but Jimmy manages to convince them to sort out their differences by saying "I mean, come on!" repeatedly and manages to bring the two gangs together, as they all then participate in various games and activities inside the recreation center as friends.

The episode ends with the four boys — having watched all the events, remarking that they were "so glad [they] stayed out of that one."

== Production ==
On the creator's commentary, Trey Parker said that because only a few people on the South Park staff (Adrien Beard, Vernon Chatman, and Isaac Hayes who provide the voices of Tolkien Black, Towelie, and Chef respectively) are African American, he had to go out into the street and find three or four black men to record the voices of the Bloods and the Crips.

According to Matt Stone and Trey Parker, they had the idea to do a Christopher Reeve parody since the previous season but held it off: "For a long time we're like, 'You know what? Maybe that's not cool.'" The two decided to do the parody because they were having trouble coming up with an idea for an episode and Reeve happened to be on Larry King Live that night. After seeing the interview, the two thought to themselves "You know what? Fuck him. He really is taking up this cause of 'Everyone needs to help me out.'"

== See also ==
- Stem cell controversy
- Crips
