= Toilet papering =

Covering things with toilet paper

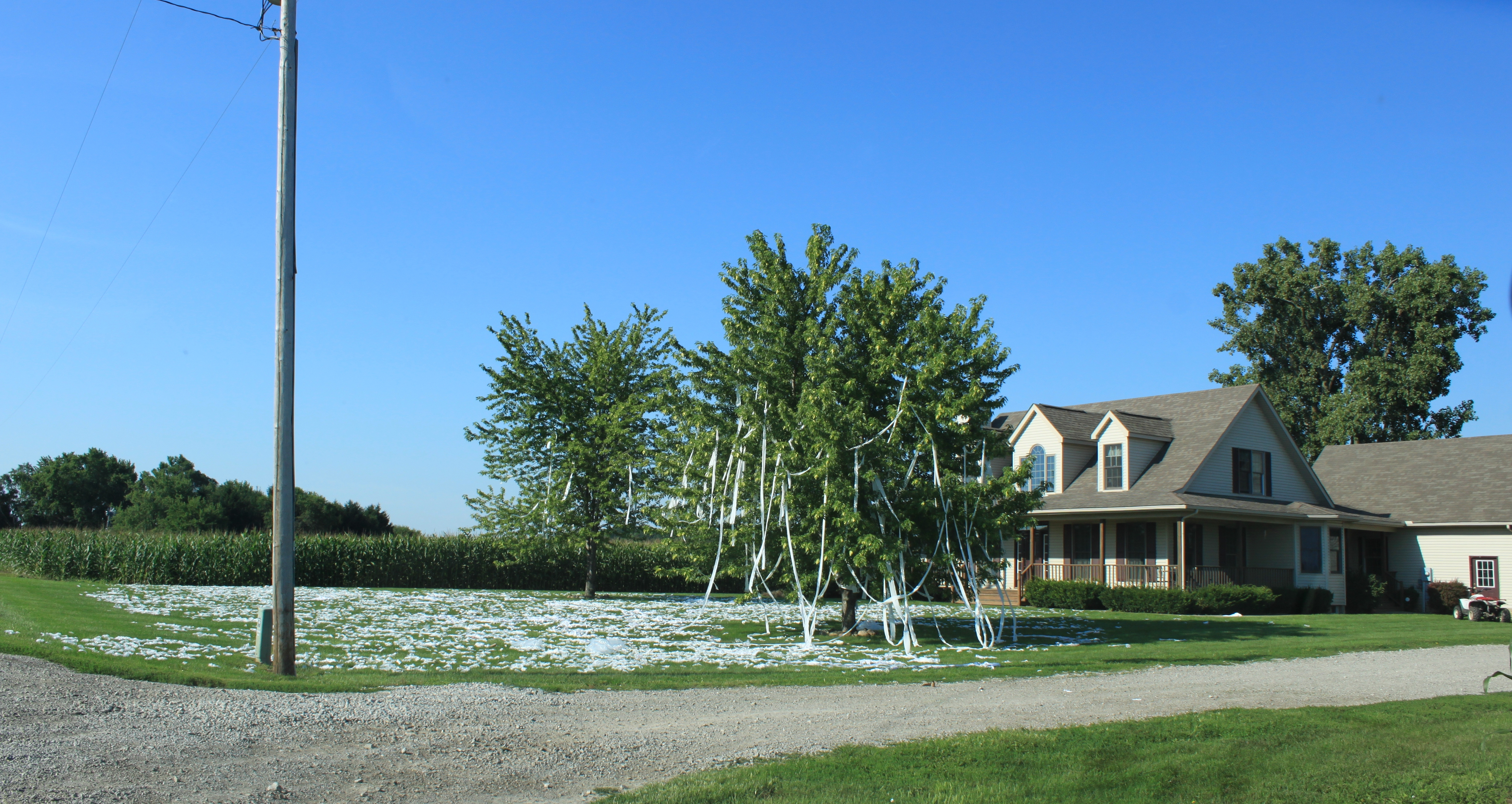
A toilet-papered residence in Deerfield, Michigan (August 12, 2011)

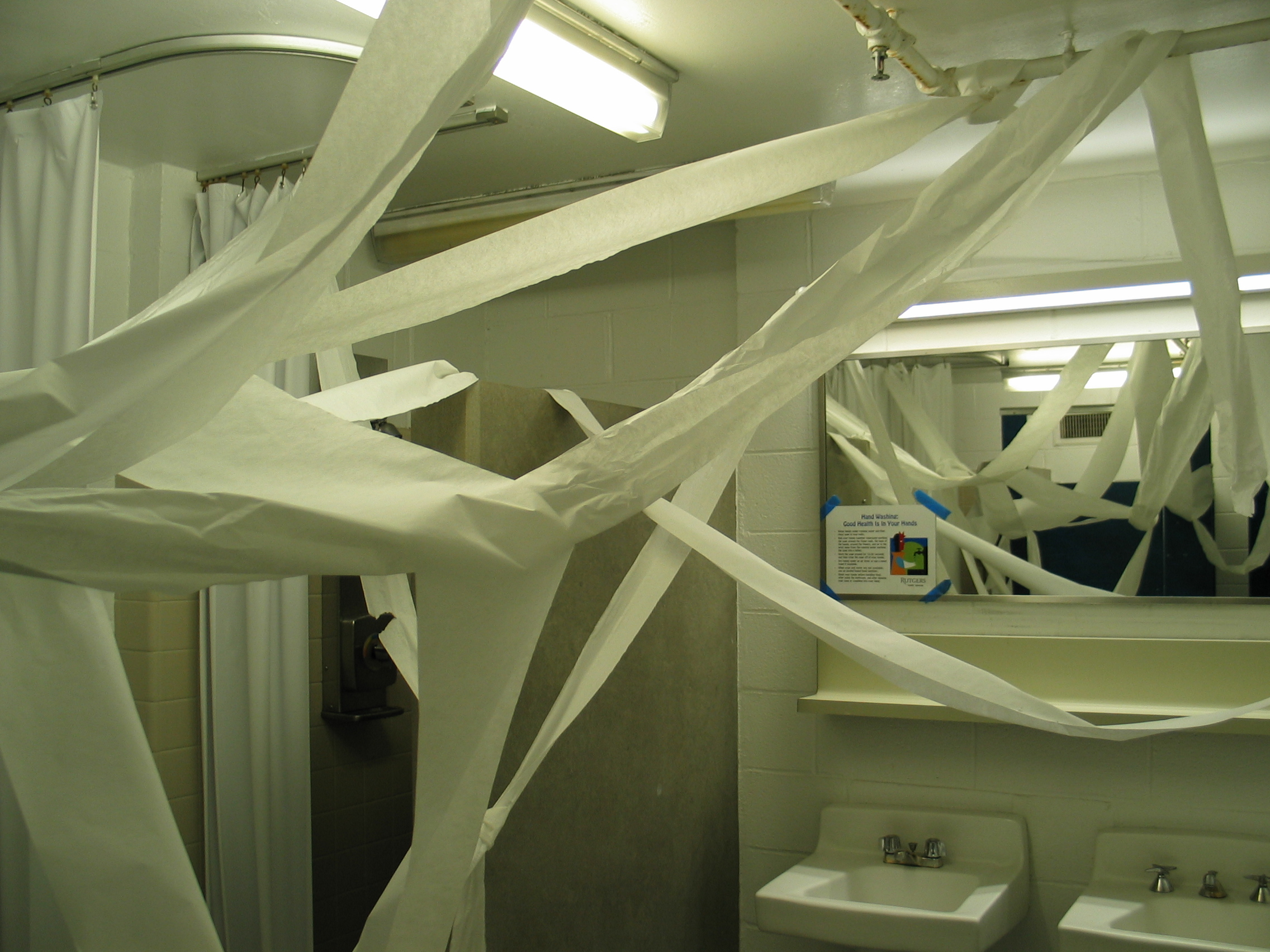
A toilet-papered bathroom (December 8, 2010)

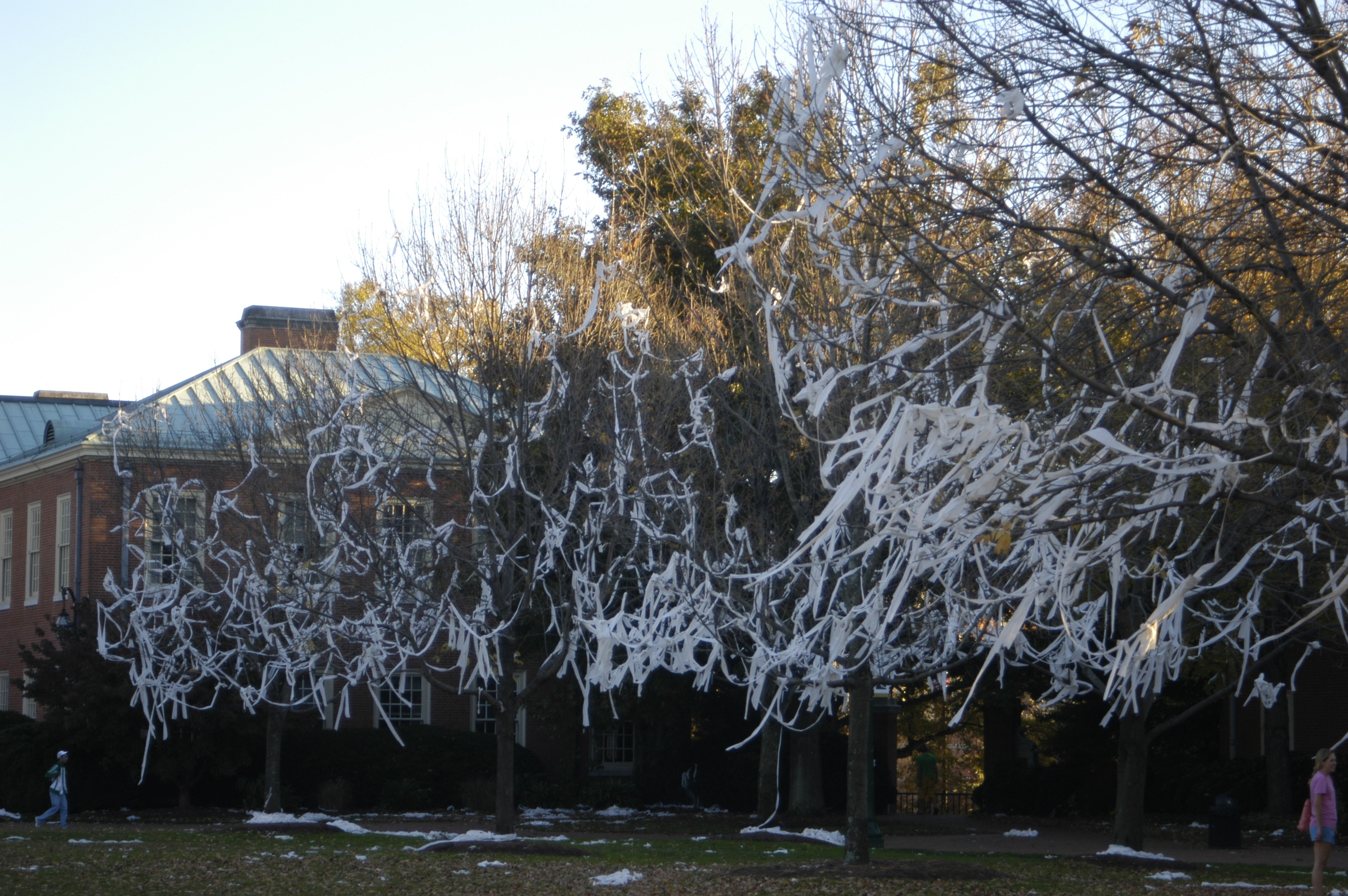
Toilet-papered trees at Wake Forest University following a basketball victory against the University of Virginia (October 29, 2006)

Toilet papering (also called TP-ing, house wrapping, yard rolling, or simply rolling) is the act of covering an object, such as a tree, house, or another structure with toilet paper. This is typically done by throwing numerous toilet paper rolls in such a way that they unroll in midair and thus fall on the targeted object in multiple streams. Toilet papering can be an initiation, a practical joke, or an act of revenge. It is common in the United States and frequently takes place on Halloween, April Fools' Day, or after the completion of school events such as graduation or the homecoming football game.

== Legality ==
While few jurisdictions in the United States have statutes specifically against toilet papering, some police departments cite perpetrators on the grounds of littering, trespassing, disorderly conduct, or criminal mischief, especially when the homeowner's property is damaged. Some counties even cite for defacing private property with up to 30 days in jail, a $1000 fine, and the possibility of probation.

== In popular culture ==
Throwing toilet paper is a component of the audience participation activities associated with showings of The Rocky Horror Picture Show. Rolls of toilet paper are customarily thrown in a reference to Scott brand toilet paper after a character shouts the phrase "Great Scott!" in response to the entrance of character Dr. Everett Scott.

In the eleventh episode of the third season of Mama's Family titled "Where's There's Smoke", Bubba Higgins, grandson of the show's title character toilet-papers the front lawn of a girl's house to show how much he loves her. Unfortunately, much to Bubba's dismay, the police are called on him.

It was the plot of an episode of South Park, titled "Toilet Paper", where the boys toilet-paper their art teacher's house.

Following the Chicago Blackhawks' Stanley Cup victory in 2015, a group of fans celebrated by toilet-papering the home of Blackhawks head coach Joel Quenneville, in Hinsdale, Illinois.

At Auburn University, it has been tradition since 1962 for fans to roll the trees at the historic Toomer's Corner after a football win, or any other event significant to the school or surrounding community. Following Auburn's defeat of Alabama in the 2010 Iron Bowl, Dadeville-based Alabama fan Harvey Updyke went to Toomer's Corner and poisoned the trees.

== See also ==
- List of practical joke topics
- Toilet paper
- Egging
