= Ply (layer) =

Layer of material combined together

A ply is a layer of material which has been combined with other layers in order to provide strength. The number of layers is indicated by prefixing a number, for example 4-ply, indicating material composed of 4 layers.

== Etymology ==
The word "ply" derives from the French verb plier, "to fold", from the Latin verb plico, from the ancient Greek verb πλέκω.

== Examples ==
- Yarn, where plying is a spinning technique to combine several fibres.
- Vehicle tires
- Plywood
- Toilet paper
