= Toilet paper =

Tissue paper for cleaning after defecation or urination

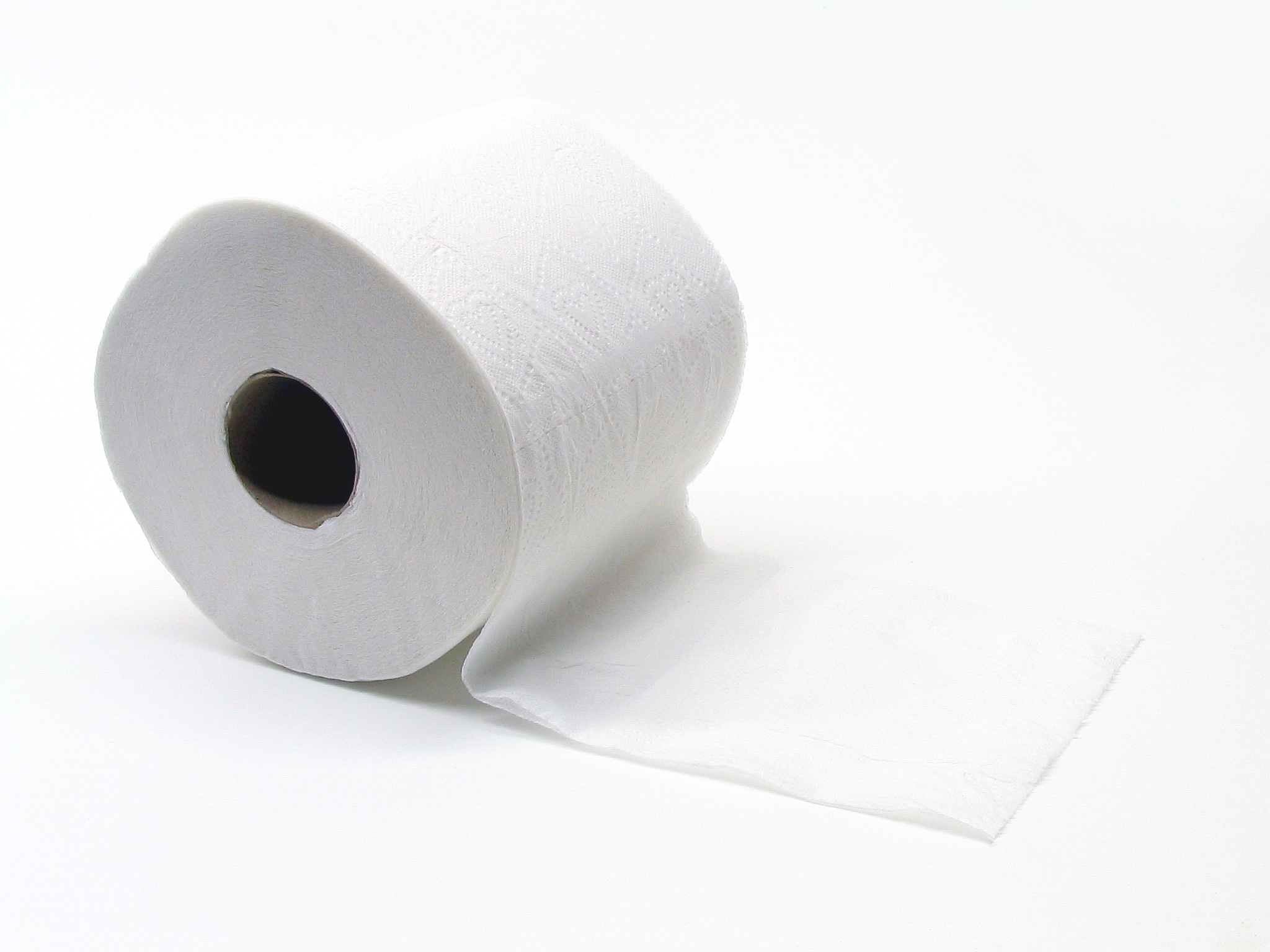
A full roll of toilet paper.

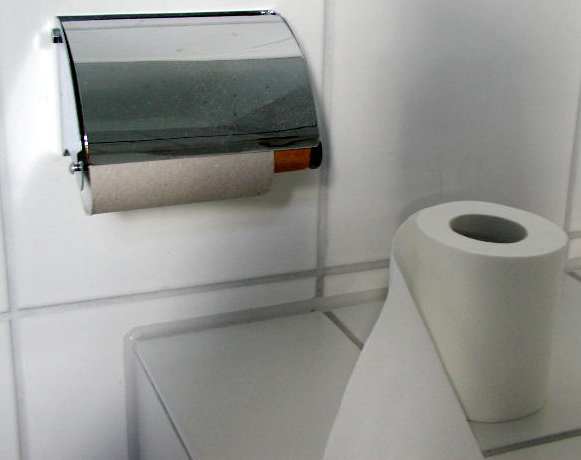
Toilet paper and a toilet paper holder; the cardboard core of an empty roll is visible on the holder.

Toilet paper (also referred to as toilet/bath/bathroom tissue or toilet roll) is a tissue paper product primarily used to clean the anus and surrounding region of feces (after defecation), and to clean the external genitalia and perineal area of urine (after urination).

It is commonly supplied as a long strip of perforated paper wrapped around a cylindrical paperboard core, for storage in a dispenser within arm's reach of a toilet. The bundle, or roll of toilet paper, is specifically known as a toilet roll, loo roll, or bog roll (in Britain).

There are other uses for toilet paper, as it is a readily available household product. It can be used for blowing the nose or wiping the eyes (or other uses of facial tissue); to wipe off sweat or absorb it; or to absorb the bloody discharge during menstruation. Toilet paper can be used in cleaning (like a less abrasive paper towel). As a teenage prank, "toilet papering" is a form of temporary vandalism.

Most modern toilet paper in the developed world is designed to decompose in septic tanks, whereas some other bathroom and facial tissues are not. Wet toilet paper rapidly decomposes in the environment. Toilet paper comes in various numbers of plies (layers of thickness), from one- to six-ply, with more back-to-back plies providing greater strength and absorbency. Most modern domestic toilet paper is white, and embossed with a pattern, which increases the surface area of the paper, and thus, its effectiveness at removing waste. Some people have a preference for whether the orientation of the roll on a dispenser should be over or under.

The use of paper for hygiene has been recorded in China in the 6th century AD, with specifically manufactured toilet paper being mass-produced in the 14th century. Modern commercial toilet paper originated in the 19th century, with a patent for roll-based dispensers being made in 1883.

== History ==
Although paper had been known as a wrapping and padding material in China since the 2nd century BC, a reference to the use of toilet paper dates back as early as c. 589 when the scholar-official Yan Zhitui (531–591) wrote:

Paper on which there are quotations or commentaries from the Five Classics or the names of sages, I dare not use for toilet purposes.

During the later Tang dynasty (618–907 AD), an Arab traveller to China in the year 851 AD remarked:

... they [the Chinese] do not wash themselves with water when they have done their necessities; but they only wipe themselves with paper.

During the early 14th century, it was recorded that in what is now Zhejiang alone, ten million packages of 1,000 to 10,000 sheets of toilet paper were manufactured annually. During the Ming dynasty (1368–1644 AD), it was recorded in 1393 that an annual supply of 720,000 sheets of toilet paper (approximately 2 by 3 ft (60 by 90 cm)) were produced for the general use of the imperial court at the capital of Nanjing. From the records of the Imperial Bureau of Supplies of that same year, it was also recorded that for the Hongwu Emperor's imperial family alone, there were 15,000 sheets of special soft-fabric toilet paper made, and each sheet of toilet paper was perfumed.

Elsewhere, wealthy people wiped themselves with wool, lace or hemp, while less wealthy people used their hand when defecating into rivers, or cleaned themselves with various materials such as rags, wood shavings, leaves, grass, hay, stones, pessoi, sand, moss, water, snow, ferns, plant husks, fruit skins, seashells, or corncobs, depending upon the country and weather conditions or social customs. In ancient Rome, a sponge on a stick was commonly used, and, after use, placed back in a pail of vinegar. Several talmudic sources indicating ancient Jewish practice refer to the use of small pebbles, often carried in a special bag, and also to the use of dry grass and of the smooth edges of broken pottery jugs.

The 16th-century French satirical writer François Rabelais, in Chapter XIII of Book 1 of his novel sequence Gargantua and Pantagruel, has his character Gargantua investigate a great number of ways of cleansing oneself after defecating. Gargantua dismisses the use of paper as ineffective, rhyming that: "Who his foul tail with paper wipes, Shall at his ballocks leave some chips." He concludes that "the neck of a goose, that is well downed" provides an optimum cleansing medium.

The rise of publishing by the eighteenth century led to the use of newspapers and cheap editions of popular books for cleansing. Lord Chesterfield, in a letter to his son in 1747, told of a man who purchased

a common edition of Horace, of which he tore off gradually a couple of pages, carried them with him to that necessary place, read them first, and then sent them down as a sacrifice to Cloacina; thus was so much time fairly gained...

In many parts of the world, especially where toilet paper or the necessary plumbing for disposal may be unavailable or unaffordable, toilet paper is not used. Also, in many parts of the world, people consider using water a much cleaner and more sanitary practice than using paper. Cleansing is then performed with other methods or materials, such as water, for example using a bidet, a lota, rags, sand, leaves (including seaweed), corn cobs, animal furs, sticks or hands; afterwards, hands are washed with water and possibly soap.

=== As a commodity ===
Joseph Gayetty is widely credited with being the inventor of modern commercially available toilet paper in the US. Gayetty's paper, first introduced in 1857, was available as late as the 1920s. Gayetty's Medicated Paper was sold in packages of flat sheets, watermarked with the inventor's name. Original advertisements for the product used the tagline "The greatest necessity of the age! Gayetty's medicated paper for the water-closet".

Seth Wheeler of Albany, New York, obtained the earliest US patents for toilet paper and dispensers, the types of which eventually were in common use in that country, in 1883. (Note: The first of note is for the idea of perforating commercial papers (25 July 1871, #117355), the application for which includes an illustration of a perforated roll of paper. On 13 February 1883, he was granted patent #272369, which presented a roll of perforated wrapping or toilet paper supported in the center with a tube. Wheeler also had patents for mounted brackets that held the rolls.) Toilet paper dispensed from rolls was popularized when the Scott Paper Company began marketing it in 1890.

The manufacturing of this product had a long period of refinement, considering that as late as the 1930s, a selling point of the Northern Tissue company was that their toilet paper was "splinter free". The widespread adoption of the flush toilet increased the use of toilet paper, as heavier paper was more prone to clogging the trap that prevents sewer gases from escaping through the toilet.

Softer, two ply toilet roll was introduced in Britain in 1942, by St Andrew Mills in Walthamstow; this became the famous Andrex.

Moist toilet paper, called wet wipes, was first introduced in the United Kingdom by Andrex in the 1990s. It has been promoted as being a better method of cleaning than dry toilet paper after defecation, and may be useful for women during menstruation. It was promoted as a flushable product but it has been implicated in the creation of fatbergs; by 2016 some municipalities had begun education campaigns advising people not to flush used wet wipes.

More than seven billion rolls of toilet paper are sold yearly in the US where an average of 23.6 rolls per capita per year is used.

External videos
- Documentarian Brian Gersten's short film about the 1973 shortage, The Great Toilet Paper Scare

In 1973, Johnny Carson joked in his Tonight Show monologue about comments made by Wisconsin congressman Harold V. Froehlich about the possibility of a toilet paper shortage. Subsequently, consumers purchased abnormal amounts, causing an actual shortage in the US for several months.

Toilet paper has been one of the commodities subject to shortages in Venezuela starting in the 2010s; the government seized one toilet paper factory in an effort to resolve the problem.

During the COVID-19 pandemic, toilet paper shortages were reported in March 2020 in multiple countries due to hoarding and panic buying. At first, few believed the pandemic would be serious. Later, people realized they might need to stock up on certain items in case of a shelter-in-place order, or in case they did not know how long such an order would last; suppliers could not assure that they could keep up with demand. However, manufacturers continued to produce even more than they had before. Demand was higher for the types of toilet paper used at home. In some countries the bidet was already seen as a solution, and a survey before the pandemic had indicated an increasing number of Americans would be interested. Amid the panic buying during the pandemic, the Australian toilet paper brand Quilton donated a million of toilet paper rolls to vulnerable Australians who were struggling due to the shortages of toilet paper.

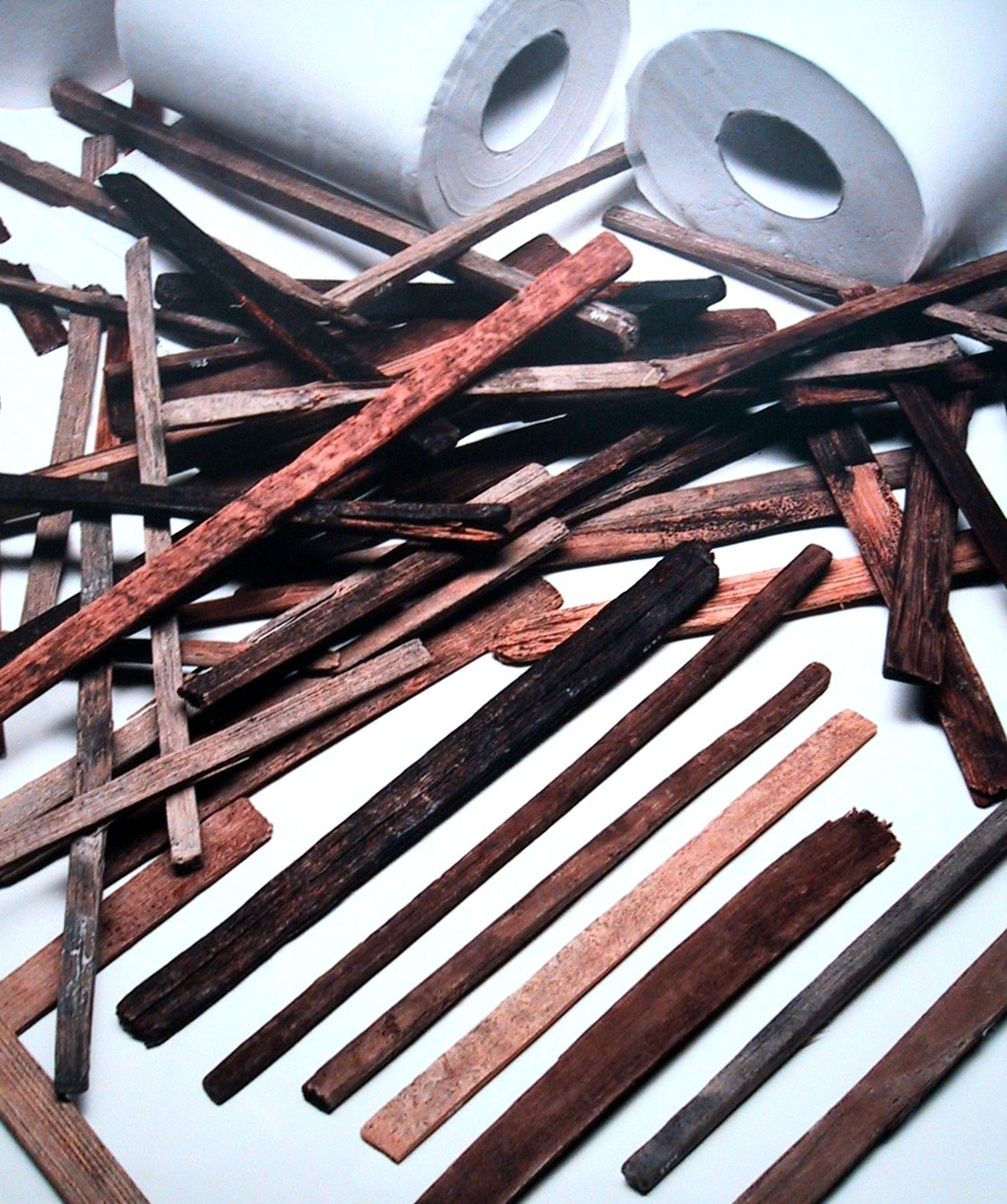
Anal cleansing instruments known as chūgi from the Nara period (710 to 784) in Japan (The modern rolls in the background are for size comparison.)

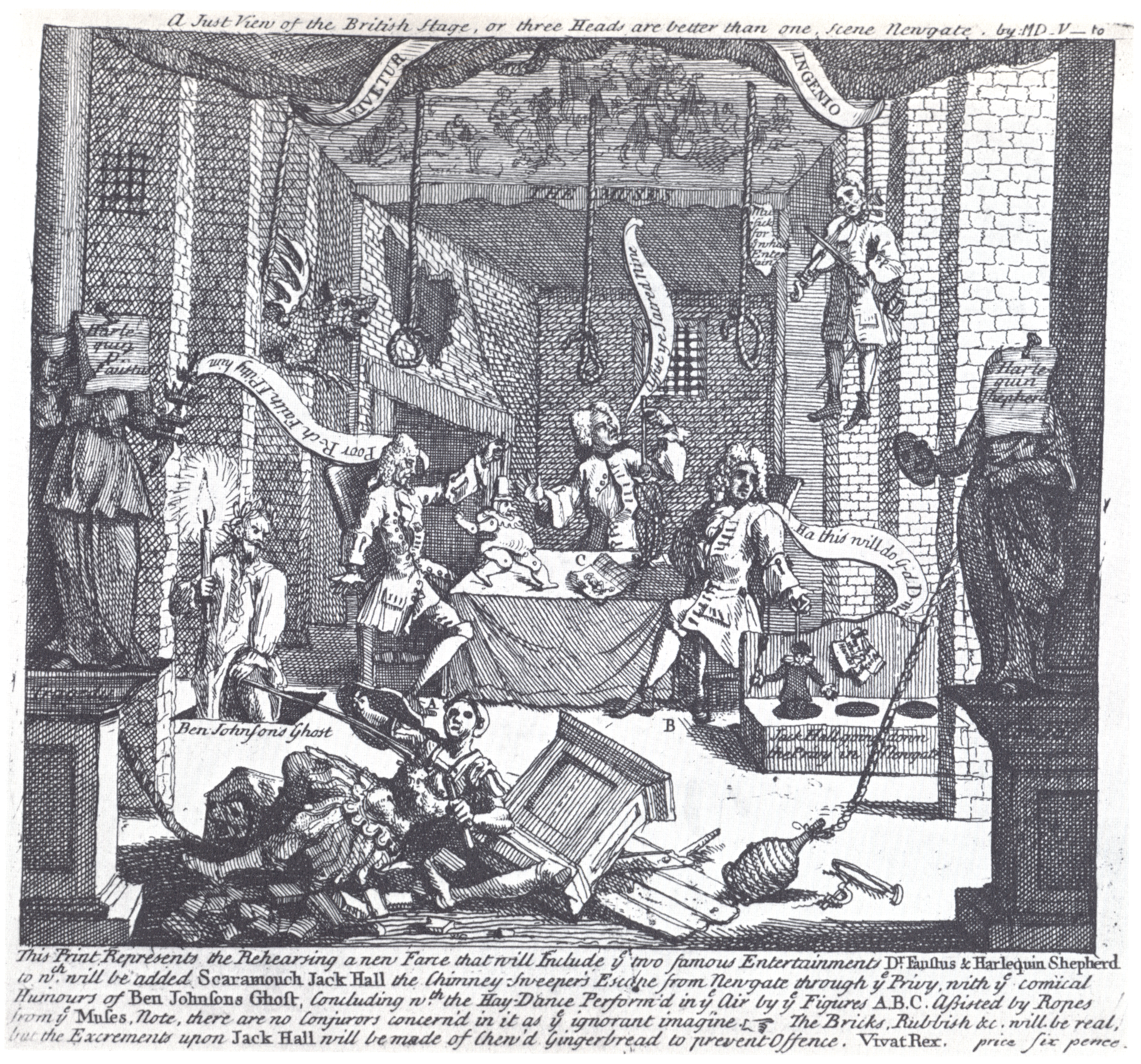
A print by William Hogarth entitled A Just View of the British Stage from 1724 depicting Robert Wilks, Colley Cibber, and Barton Booth rehearsing a pantomime play with puppets enacting a prison break down a privy. The "play" is composed of nothing but toilet paper, and the scripts for Hamlet, inter al., are toilet paper.

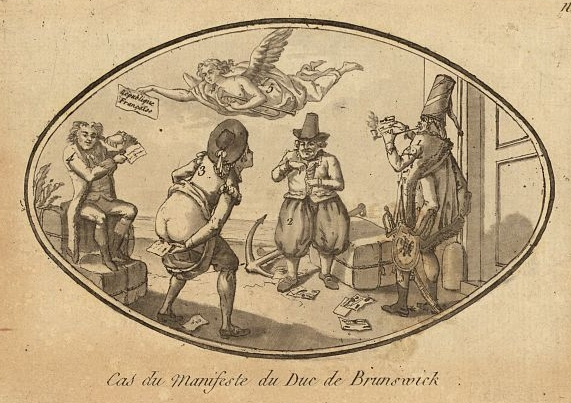
A 1792 French Revolutionary caricature, depicting the French population using the Monarchist Brunswick Manifesto as toilet paper

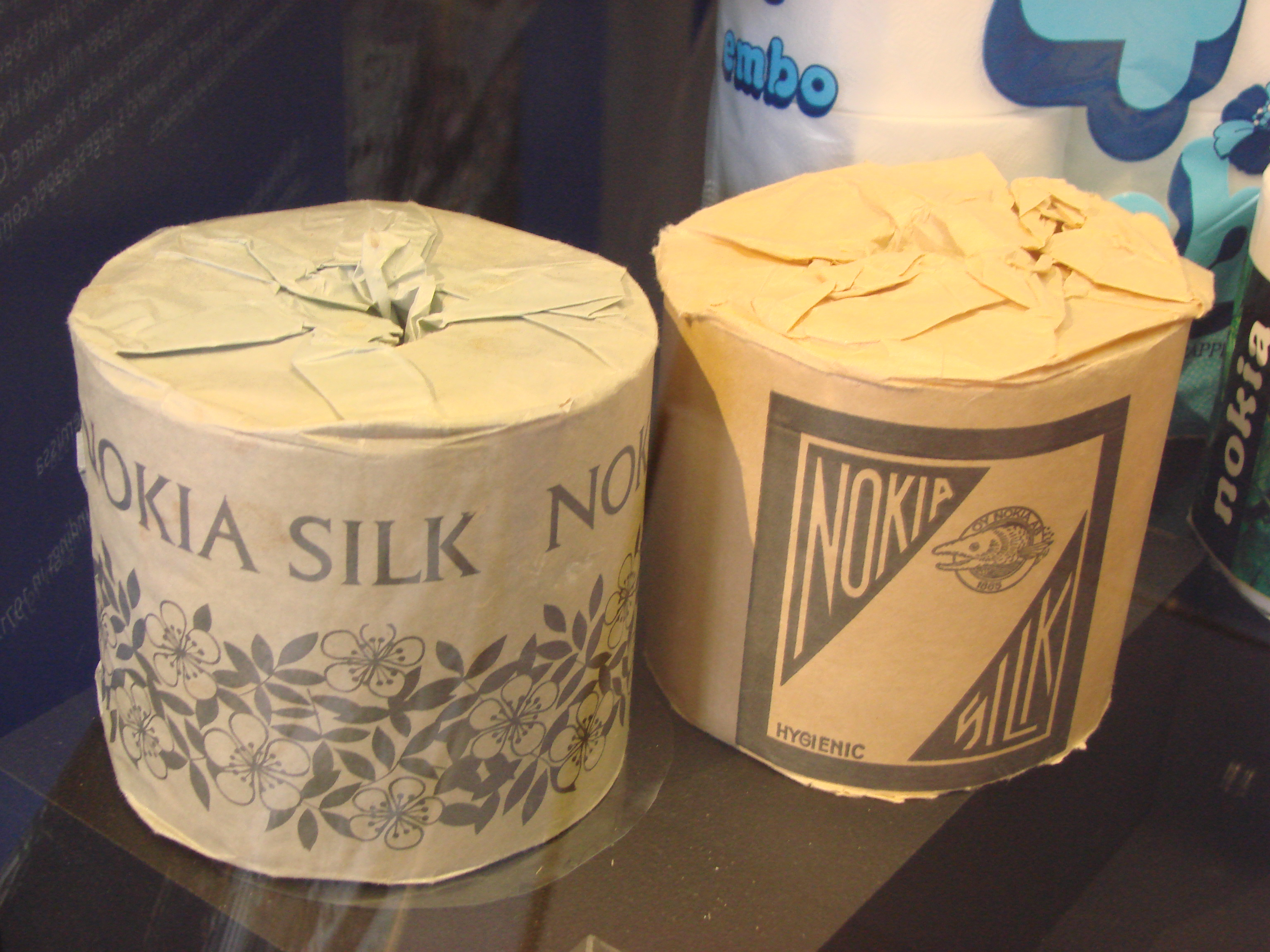
Rolls of toilet paper, produced by Nokia in the 1960s, at the Vapriikki Museum Centre in Tampere, Finland

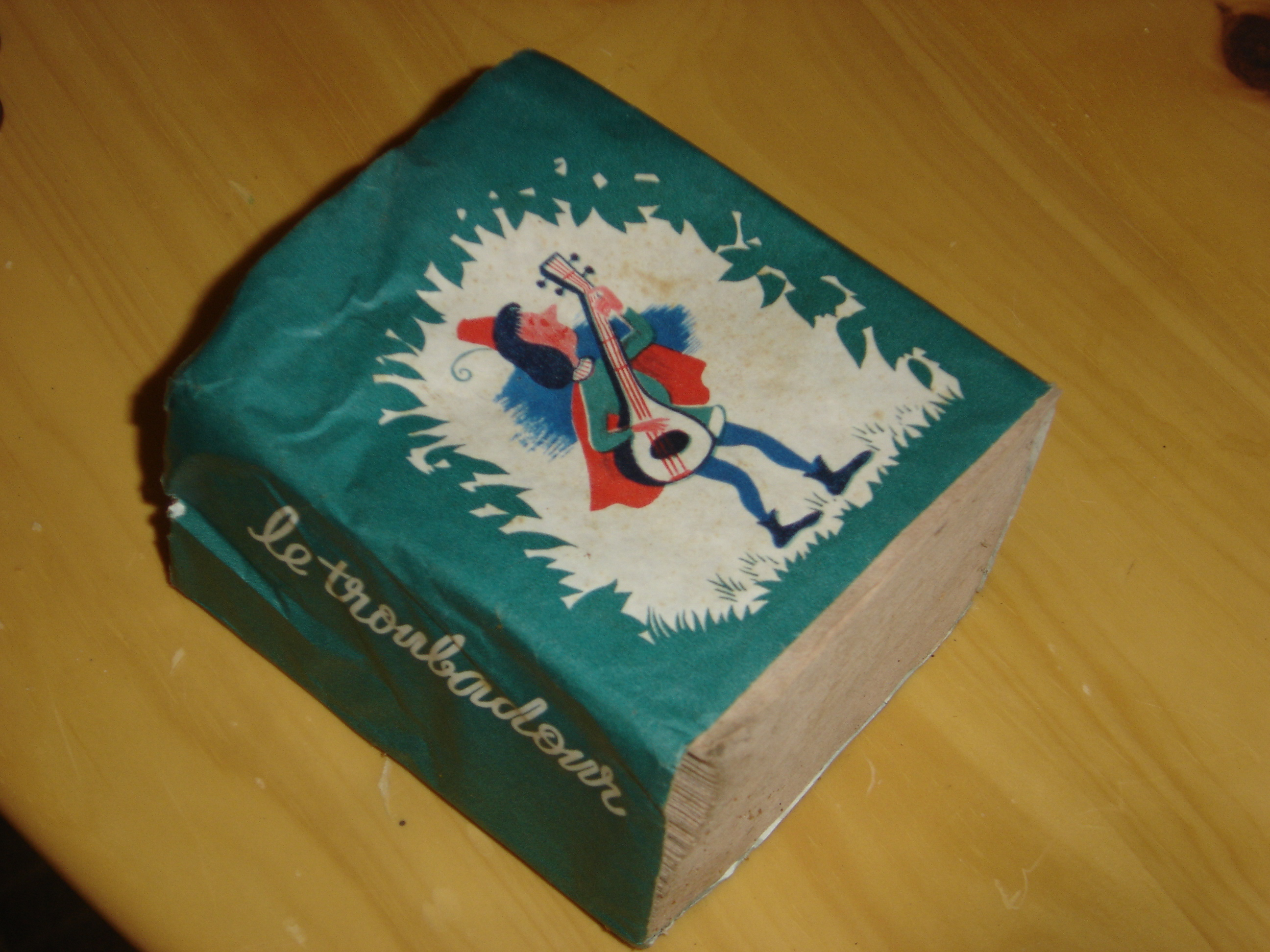
Le Troubadour (French) – 1960s package of toilet paper

== Description ==
Toilet paper is available in several types of paper, a variety of patterns, decorations, and textures, and it may be moistened or perfumed, although fragrances sometimes cause problems for users who are allergic to perfumes. The average measures of a modern roll of toilet paper is c. 10 cm (3 15/16 in.) wide, and 12 cm (4 23/32 in.) in diameter, and weighs between 85 g (3.0 oz) and 196 g (6.9 oz). An alternative method of packing the sheets uses interleaved sheets in boxes, or in bulk for use in dispensers. "Hard" single-ply paper has been used as well as soft multi-ply.

=== Sheet size ===
The format of individual sheets of toilet paper, which is given by a perforation line, varies nationally. In Germany, Holland, France, Poland, Switzerland, for example, about postcard size is standard (about 100 × 140 mm), so about DIN format (DIN A6 105 × 148 mm). In England, the usual format is already somewhat wider, about 115 × 135 mm. The most extreme landscape format with 115 × 102 mm exists in Thailand. The most extreme portrait format (not counting toilet paper rolls without any perforation) is 100 × 366 mm; a promotional toilet paper from Schmidt Spiele in Germany. Manufactured toilet paper sheet in the US was sized 4.5 in (110 mm) × 4 in (100 mm). Since 1999 the size of a sheet has been shrinking; Kimberly-Clark reduced the length of a sheet to 4.1 in (100 mm). Scott Paper Company, in 2006, reduced the length of their product to 3.7 in (94 mm). The width of sheets was later reduced giving a general sheet size of 3.7 in (94 mm) long and 4.1 in (100 mm) wide. Larger sizes remain available.

=== Sheet ply ===
The ply of a toilet paper refers to the number of layers per sheet. Rolls are typically available in single-ply, 2-ply, 3-ply, and 4-ply.

=== Roll length ===
Phrases like "single roll", "double roll", "triple roll", "jumbo roll", and "mega roll" commonly used in retail advertising refer to the number of sheets per roll (though the actual number of sheets is also usually disclosed on packaging). A longer roll needs to be replaced less often, but the very largest sizes do not fit all toilet paper dispensers, especially in older homes.

=== Materials ===
Toilet paper is usually manufactured from pulpwood trees, but is also sometimes made from sugar cane byproducts or bamboo.

Toilet paper products vary greatly in the distinguishing technical factors, such as size, weight, roughness, softness, chemical residues, "finger-breakthrough" resistance, water-absorption, etc. The larger companies have very detailed, scientific market surveys to determine which marketing sectors require or demand which of the many technical qualities. Modern toilet paper may have a light coating of aloe or lotion or wax worked into the paper to reduce roughness.

Quality is usually determined by the number of plies (stacked sheets), coarseness, and durability. Low grade institutional toilet paper is typically of the lowest grade of paper, has only one or two plies, is very coarse and sometimes contains small amounts of embedded unbleached/unpulped paper; it was typically called "hard" toilet paper. A brand disinfected with carbolic acid was manufactured in Sheffield, United Kingdom under the Izal brand name by Newton Chambers until 1981. Mid-grade two ply is somewhat textured to provide some softness and is somewhat stronger. Premium toilet paper may have lotion and wax and has two to four plies of very finely pulped paper. If it is marketed as "luxury", it may be quilted or rippled (embossed), perfumed, colored or patterned, medicated (with anti-bacterial chemicals), or treated with aloe or other perfumes.

To advance decomposition of the paper in septic tanks or drainage, the paper used has shorter fibres than facial tissue or writing paper. The manufacturer tries to reach an optimal balance between rapid decomposition (which requires shorter fibres) and sturdiness (which requires longer fibres). Compaction of toilet paper in drain lines, such as in a clog, prevents fibre dispersion and largely halts the breakdown process.

A German quip says that the toilet paper of Nazi Germany was so rough and scratchy that it was almost unusable, so many people used old issues of the Völkischer Beobachter instead, because the paper was softer.

=== Color and design ===
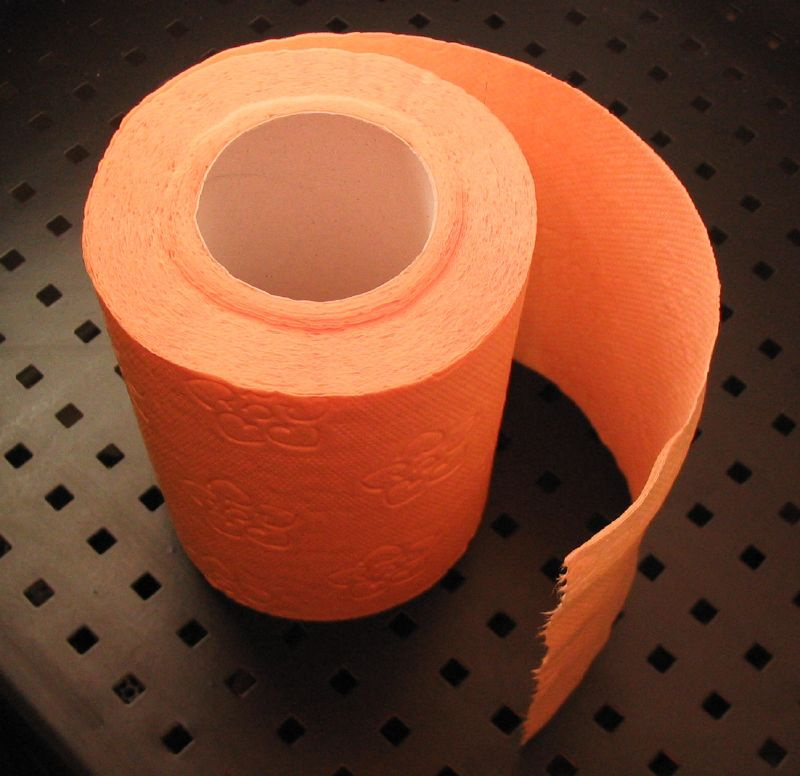
Apricot colored toilet paper

Colored toilet paper in colors such as pink, lavender, light blue, light green, purple, green, and light yellow (so that one could choose a color of toilet paper that matched or complemented the color of one's bathroom) was commonly sold in the US from the 1960s. Up until 2004, Scott was one of the last remaining US manufacturers to still produce toilet paper in beige, blue, and pink. However, the company has since cut production of colored paper altogether.

Colored toilet paper remains commonly available in some European countries. Here in solid color toilet paper base, apart from the natural tones between white and gray or beige, pastel shades prevail: pink, apricot, light yellow and light blue. In rare cases, pale purple or pale green can be found. However, rich colors are rarely used, such as black, wine red, neon green, royal blue. Flat printed toilet paper is uncommon. If there is printing, it is often one color. Common print colors are pink and pinkish red, also blue, more rarely purple, orange, brown or green.

=== Design ===
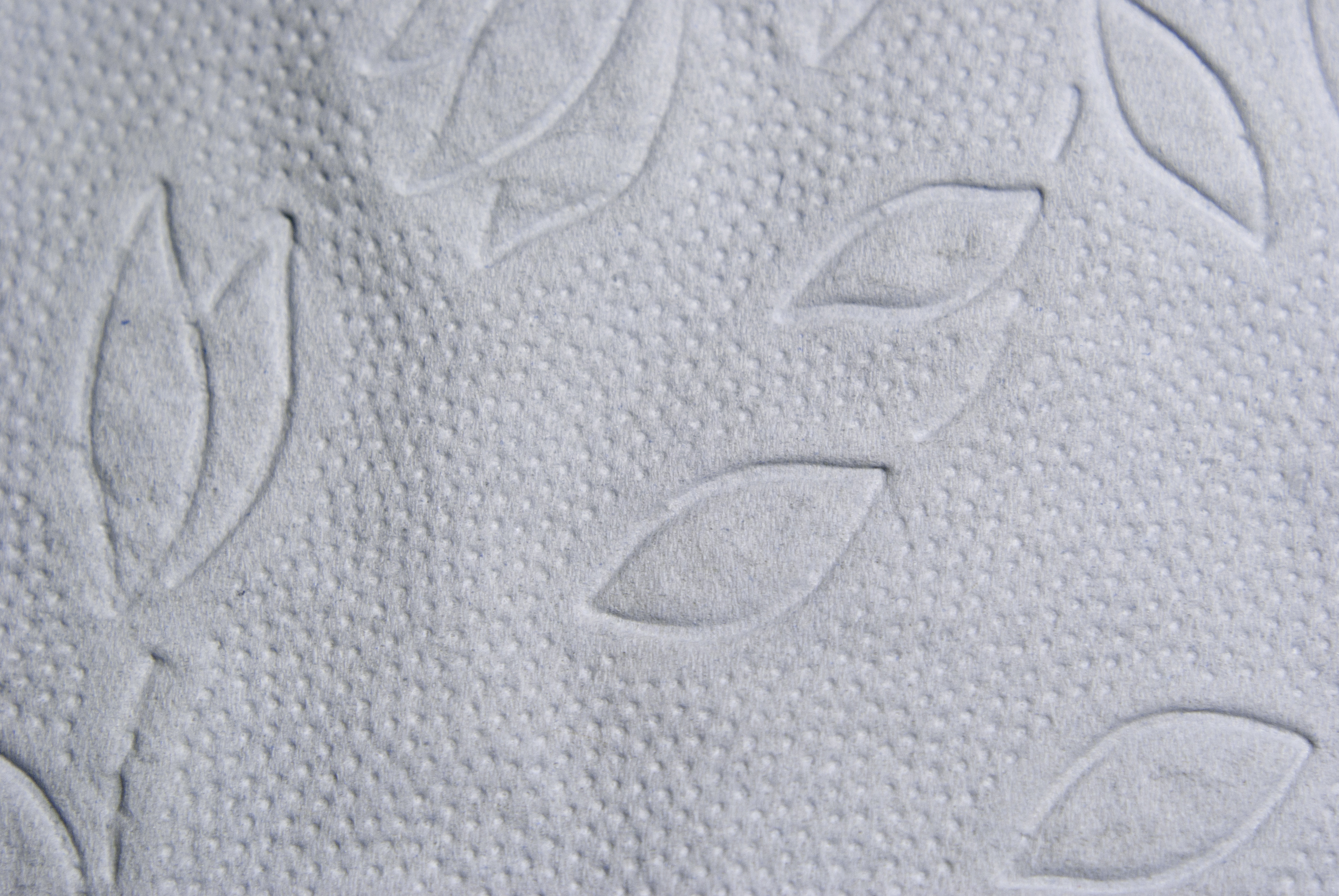
Leaves as motif on toilet paper

In the conetmporary US, plain unpatterned colored toilet paper has been mostly replaced by patterned toilet paper, normally white, with embossed decorative patterns or designs in various colors and different sizes depending on the brand. The patterns are in most cases "scatter patterns", that is, a motif is distributed ("scattered") several times (irregularly) over the surface. Stripes and dot patterns are rare. Occasionally, toilet papers have an embossed crocodile, wave, circle or check pattern. Some are additionally printed. Ornaments usually stand on their own as self-contained units. They never go uninterrupted (for example, as a border) from the first to the last sheet.

=== Motifs ===
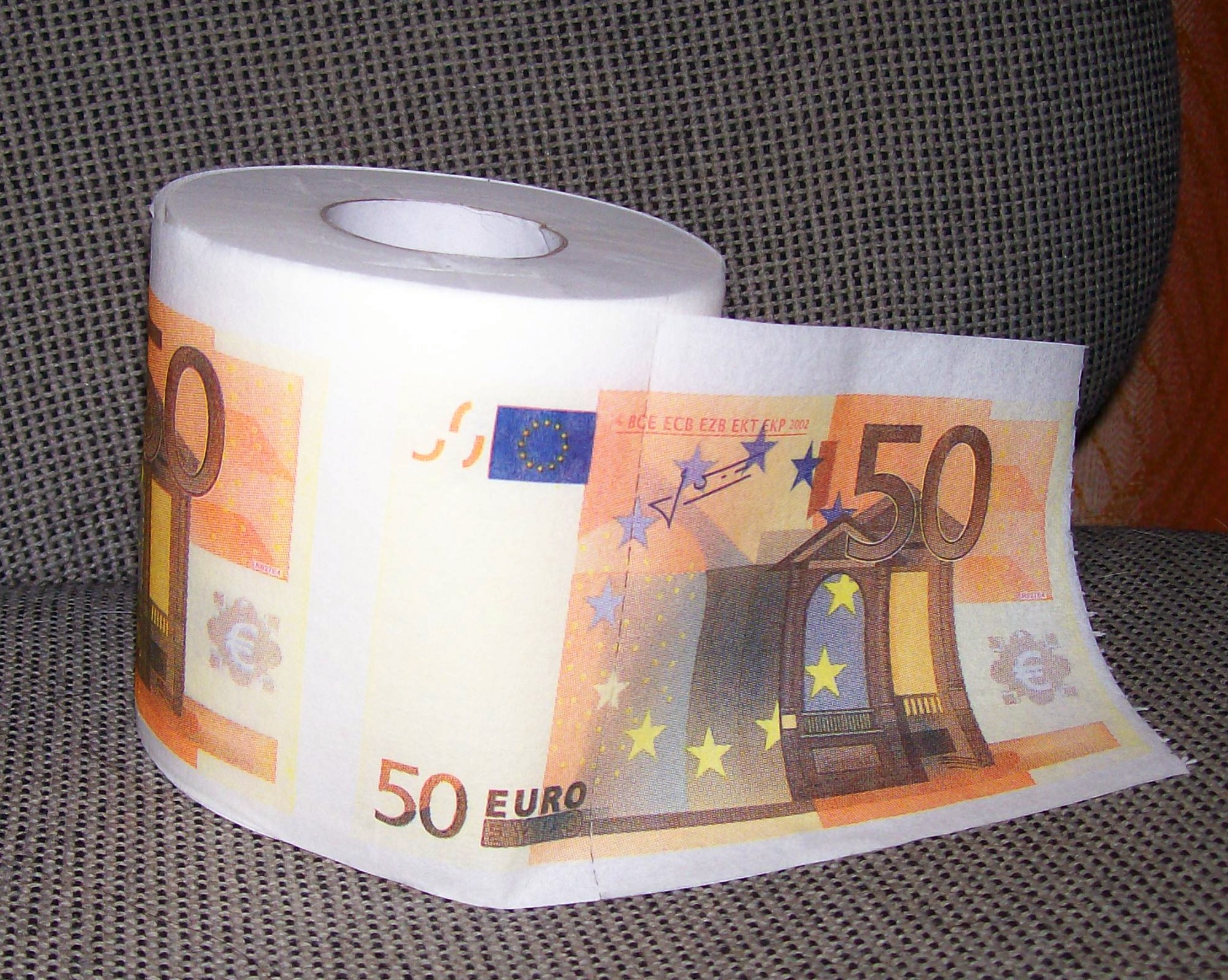
Toilet paper with motif 50 euro bills

Predominant is everything that is associated "softness" and "fluffiness". There are decorations with bears, cats, rabbits, down feathers, clouds. Another motifs are things associated with "lightness": Clouds, downy feathers, leaves of all kinds, butterflies, flying birds. Another association is anything associated with pleasant fragrance: especially flowers of all kinds. Rare are motifs intended to appear noble, such as the Bourbon lily. Less rare are allusions to water, such as fish, shells and other aquatic creatures.

Toilet papers are also provided with texts (jokes, poems), joke motifs (banknotes, politicians in their own or neighbouring companies) or advertising imprints.

=== Texture ===
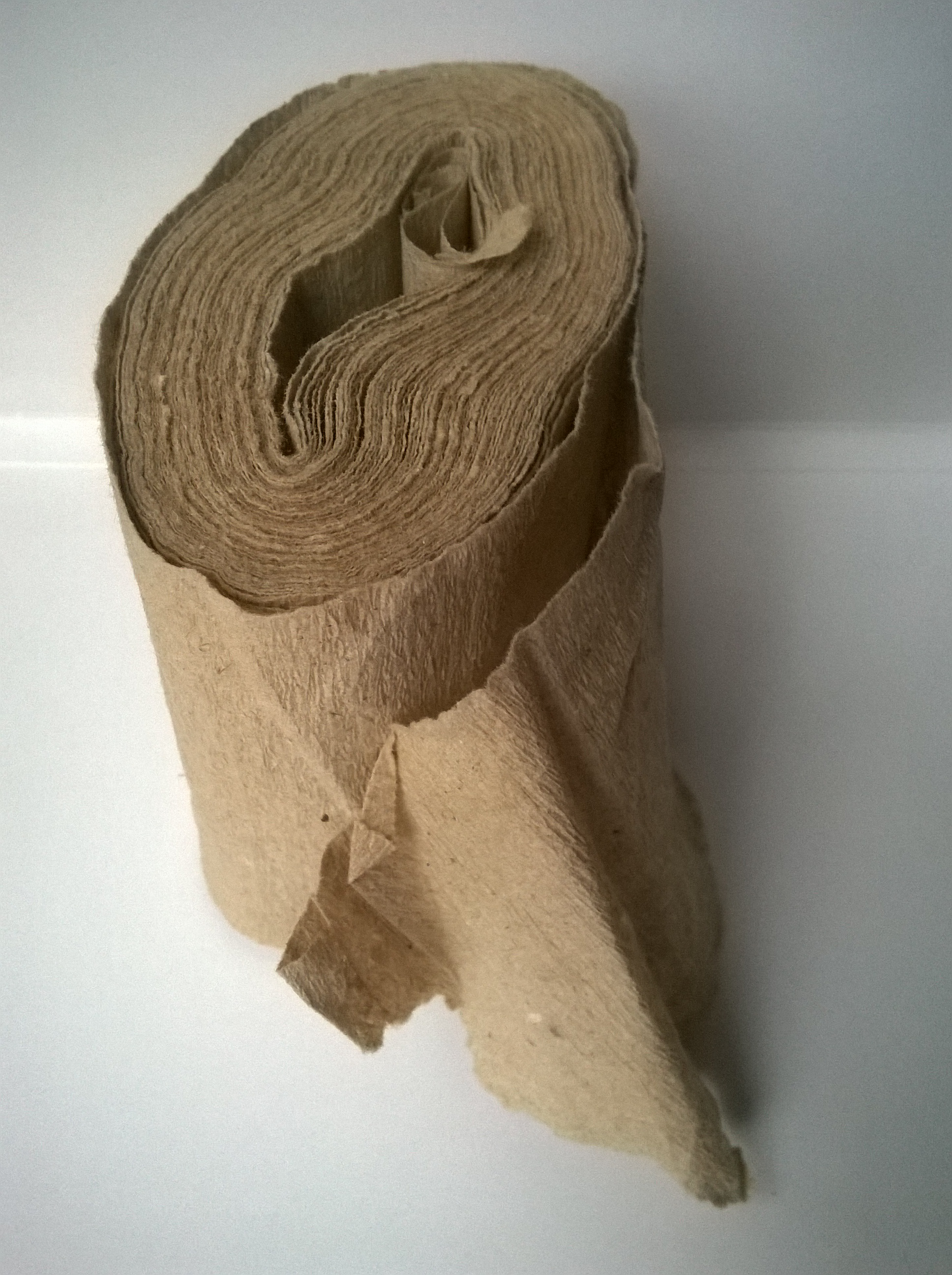
Crêpe secondary raw material toilet paper

Toilet paper is offered in different qualities. The cheapest toilet papers have a texture close to crêpe paper. They are often made of recycled material. Expensive toilet papers are made from particularly absorbent, delicate tissue paper. Toilet paper usually has a smooth surface. With several intentions, it is occasionally embossed. On the one hand, the embossing can serve to stabilize the paper. Furthermore, wiping can become more effective. Third, there are design reasons. In Switzerland, in particular, there are often toilet paper with burls. In Germany, the number of plies is considered a quality feature. In the USA, Great Britain and Japan, the quality feature is that the toilet paper is as delicate and fine as possible.

=== Additives ===
Some toilet papers are perfumed. Popular scents are chamomile, peach or rose. Other toilet papers are impregnated with antibacterial additives.

== Installation ==
=== Dispensers ===
A toilet roll holder, also known as a toilet paper dispenser, is an item that holds a roll of toilet paper. There are at least seven types of holders:

1. A horizontal piece of wire mounted on a hinge, hanging from a door or wall.
2. A horizontal axle recessed in the wall.
3. A vertical axle recessed in the wall
4. A horizontal axle mounted on a freestanding frame.
5. A freestanding vertical pole on a base.
6. A wall mounted dispensing unit, usually containing more than one roll. This is used in the commercial/away-from-home marketplace.
7. A wall mounted dispensing unit with tissue interleaved in a "S"-type fold so the user can extract the tissue one sheet at a time.

Some commercial or institutional toilet paper is wrapped around a cylinder to many times the thickness of a standard toilet paper roll.

=== Orientation ===
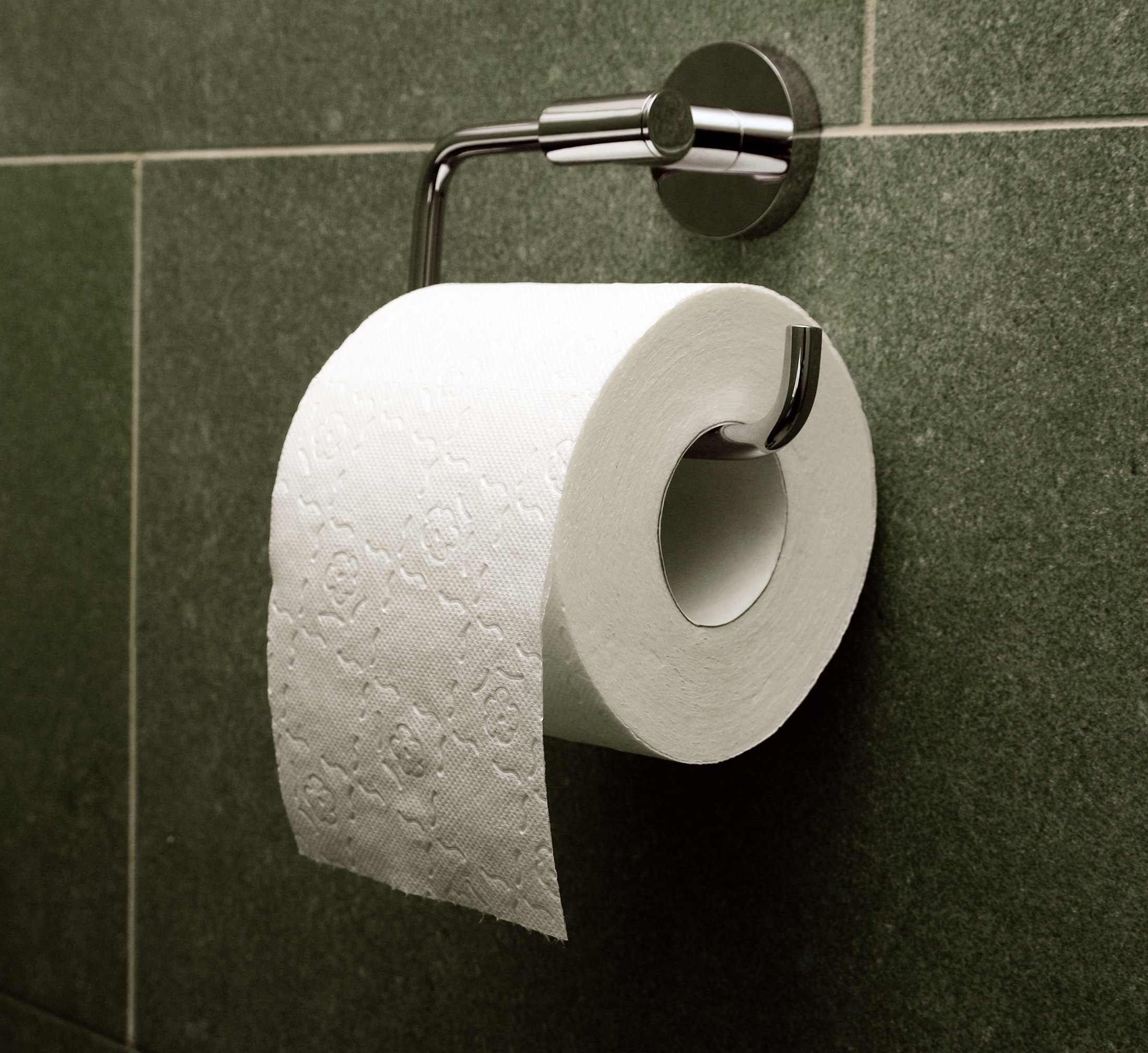
The over orientation

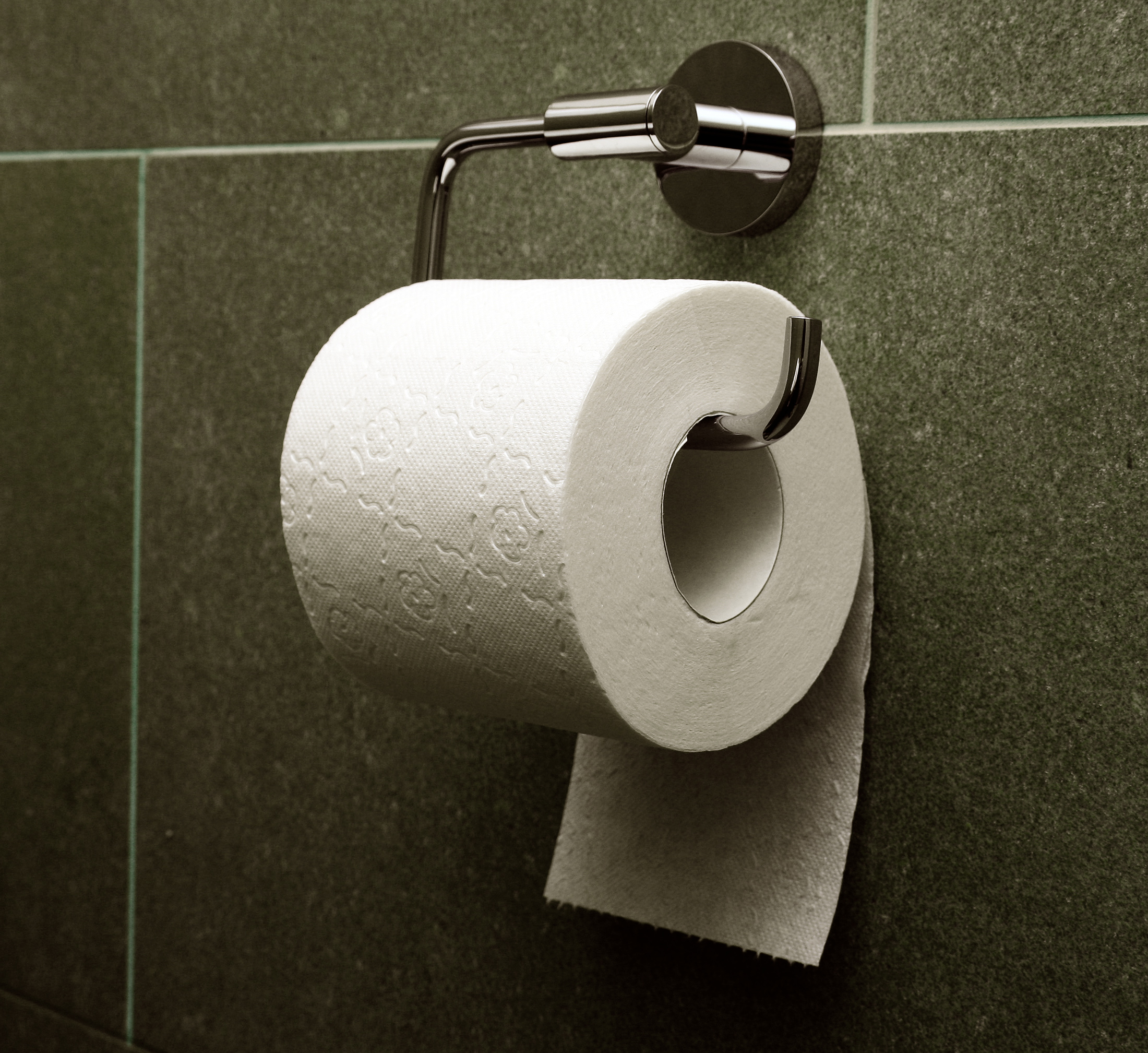
The under orientation

There are two choices of orientation when using a holder with a horizontal axle parallel to the wall: the toilet paper may hang over or under the roll. The choice is largely a matter of personal preference, dictated by habit. In surveys of American consumers and of bath and kitchen specialists, 60–70% of respondents prefer over. Most Americans think it should go over the top, like a waterfall.

=== Decoration ===
Toilegami refers to toilet paper origami. Like table napkins, some fancy Japanese hotels fold the first squares of toilet paper on its dispenser to be presented in a fashionable way.

=== Recreational use ===
In the US, toilet paper has been the primary tool in a prank known as "TP-ing" (pronounced "teepeeing"). TP-ing, or "toilet papering", is often favored by adolescents and is the act of throwing rolls of toilet paper over cars, trees, houses and gardens, causing the toilet paper to unfurl and cover the property, creating an inconvenient mess.

Children and cats may unroll an entire roll of toilet paper by spinning it until it completely unravels on the floor, or as a game by children wadding up one end, putting it in the toilet bowl without tearing it and then using the flushing of the toilet to pull new paper into the toilet, with the objective of flushing the entire roll down the toilet section at a time without the toilet paper breaking. Special toilet paper insert holders with an oblong shape were invented to prevent continuous unrolling without tearing to discourage this practice.

Toilet paper pranks include talking toilet paper holders and inserts that are activated by the unrolling of the toilet paper and will loudly play an embarrassing message calling attention to the person defecating.

Other gags include custom toilet paper printed with jokes, stories or politician's images.

== Mechanics ==
Alexander Balankin and coauthors have studied the behavior of toilet paper under tensile stress and during wetting and burning.

Toilet paper has been used in physics education to demonstrate the concepts of torque, moment of inertia, and angular momentum; and the conservation of momentum and energy.

== Environmental considerations ==
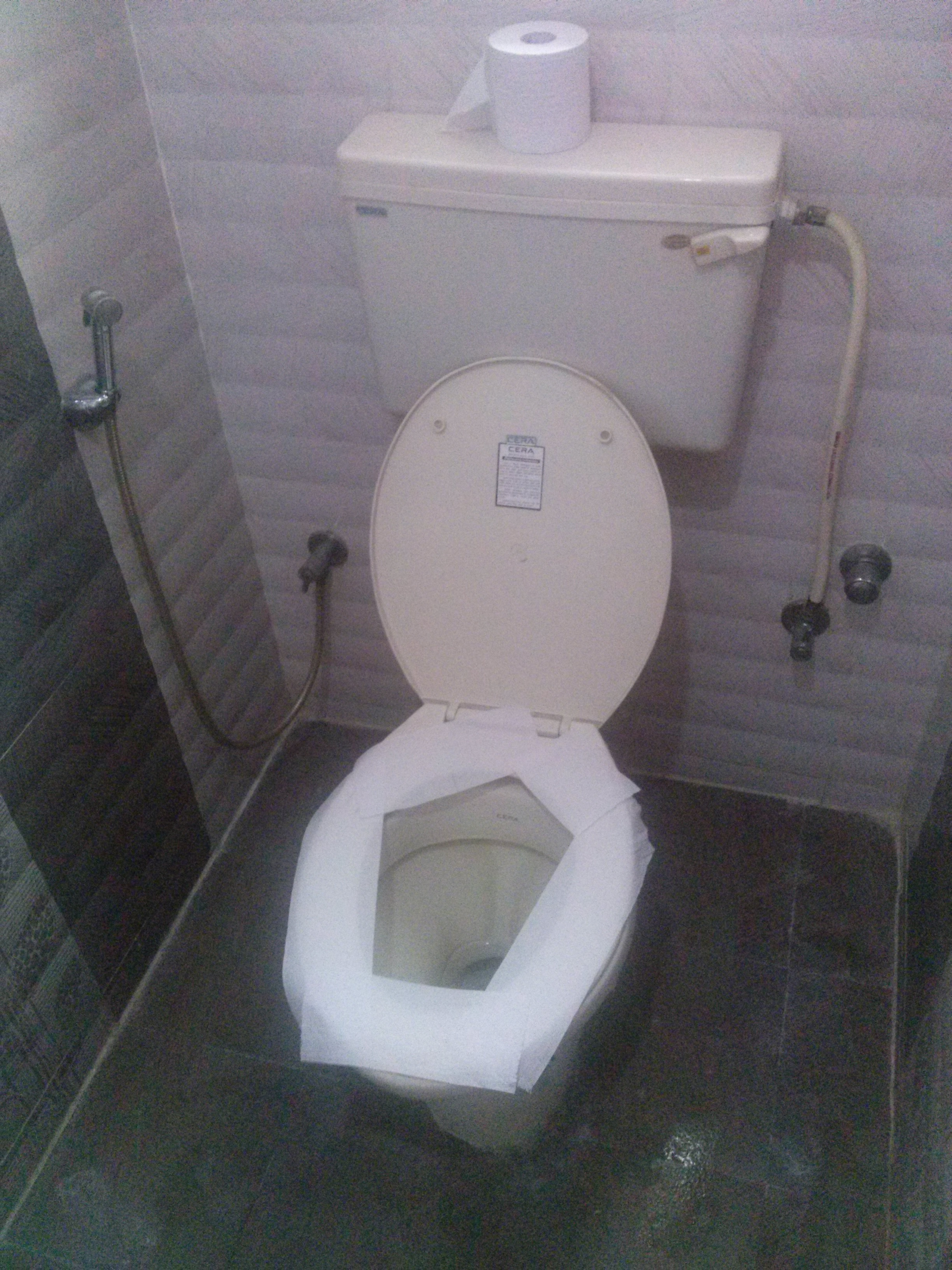
Some individuals place toilet paper on public toilet seats before sitting down.

One tree produces about 800 rolls (400 pounds (180 kg)) of toilet paper and about 83 million rolls are produced per day. Global toilet paper production consumes 27,000 trees daily.

More than seven billion rolls of toilet paper are sold yearly in the US alone. Americans use an average of 141 rolls per capita a year which is equivalent to 12.7 kilograms (28 lb) of tissue paper per year. This figure is about 50% more than the average of other Western countries or Japan. The higher use in the US may be explained by the fact that people in other countries use bidets or spray hoses to clean themselves. Millions of trees are harvested in North and South America leaving ecological footprint concerns.

As of 2009, between 22% and 48% of the toilet paper used in the US comes from tree farms in the US and South America, with the rest mostly coming from old, second growth forests, and, some from virgin forests.

=== Alternatives to virgin wood pulp ===
Toilet paper made from recycled paper avoids the direct environmental impact of cutting down trees, and is commercially available. Recycled newspaper can contain BPA, an endocrine disruptor.

Toilet paper produced from bamboo is commercially available, and is in some ways more environmentally friendly than virgin pulpwood, because bamboo grows faster, taking less land and less water. For North American consumers, the Natural Resources Defense Council recommends recycled tree pulp over bamboo toilet paper, because tree forests promote more biodiversity and bamboo products must be shipped from Asia.

Toilet paper produced from bagasse, a byproduct of sugarcane, is commercially available, and avoids cutting down any plants because sugarcane is already grown for sugar production.

The most eco-friendly alternatives are to rely solely on soap and water for anal hygiene.

== See also ==
- Anal hygiene
- Fresh'n
- Xylospongium, an ancient equivalent
