= South Park: Tenorman's Revenge =

2012 video game

- Developer: Other Ocean Interactive
- Publisher: Microsoft Studios
- Platform: Xbox 360
- Release: March 30, 2012
- Genre: Platform
- Modes: Single-player, multiplayer

South Park: Tenorman's Revenge is a platform video game based on the American animated television series South Park. Developed by Canadian studio Other Ocean Interactive, in collaboration with South Park Digital Studios and Xbox Live Productions, and published by Microsoft Studios, South Park: Tenorman's Revenge was released on March 30, 2012, on the Xbox Live Arcade service for the Xbox 360 video game console. In the game, players can control the four main characters of the show, Stan, Kyle, Cartman and Kenny, and the goal is to battle Scott Tenorman and his army of gingers, as the kids travel through time.

== Plot ==
The story, as narrated by the Wise One, begins when Scott Tenorman sneaks into Cartman's house at night and steals his Xbox 360 hard drive. In fear of losing all their progress in games such as L.A. Noire and Batman: Arkham City, the boys give chase to Tenorman through a portal, not knowing where in time and space it will take them.

The boys emerge in the year 2546, which Tenorman has manipulated into his own image using his new army of Ginger robots. Fighting through the robots as well as some creations stolen from Dr. Mephesto, they eventually confront Tenorman, destroying a colossal robotic incarnation of himself known as Robo-Tenorman 1.0 before he flees through another portal.

Returning to the present day, the boys enter the sewers to search for Mr. Hankey, who they believe can help them. Riding the Poo-Choo Train to Mr. Hankey's home, he enables them to return to the sewers from anywhere on their travels through the use of "brown keys" before leaving the sewers and following Tenorman to Pi Pi's Splashtown, from which they quickly escape after an encounter with a tsunami of urine before heading to Tynacorp. The boys meet Towelie on their way through (although he proves to be of little use to them as a result of being high) and are able to defeat Tenorman's henchman, ManBearPig.

In the county dump, Tenorman challenges the boys to rescue Butters, playing in his house of junk, before he is unknowingly crushed by junkyard machinery. After saving him, they chase Tenorman into Heaven just as it is attacked by Satan's army of demons. The boys help St. Peter to fight back against the demons, eventually travelling into Hell and defeating the AntiChrist.

After making their way through the jungles of Peru, the boys finally travel through a portal to Tenorman's base, the Chili con Carnival. Fighting waves of robots throughout the theme park, they eventually corner Tenorman at his throne, where he reveals a significantly more powerful robotic incarnation, Robo-Tenorman 2.0, and proceeds to attack them. Despite almost losing the hard drive to a pit of boiling hot chili, the boys eventually defeat Tenorman, finally taking back the hard drive. The story ends as the Wise One finishes narrating the story to a number of other children, praising Cartman, the 'Time Child', for his heroic efforts.

== Reception ==
South Park: Tenorman's Revenge received mixed reviews from critics. On Metacritic, the game has a score of 52 out of 100, based on 16 reviews.

Steven Hopper of IGN gave the game a 7/10, saying that "playing the game alone can be pretty frustrating," criticizing how you can't change characters after initial selection, also criticizing the poor camera and the "big gaps" in between checkpoints. However, he praised the presentation of the game. Tom Mc Shea of GameSpot gave the game a negative review, criticizing its platforming and calling it "a messy combination of poor ideas and lousy execution". Dan Ryckert of Game Informer was also negative, describing the game as one of the least enjoyable titles on Xbox Live Arcade and criticizing its level design and use of the South Park license.

== See also ==
- List of South Park video games
