= Terrance and Phillip: Behind the Blow =

- South Park episode
- Episode no.: Season 5 Episode 5
- Directed by: Trey Parker
- Written by: Trey Parker
- Production code: 505
- Original air date: July 18, 2001

Episode chronology
← Previous "Scott Tenorman Must Die"	Next → "Cartmanland"
- South Park season 5

"Terrance and Phillip: Behind the Blow" is the fifth episode of the fifth season of the animated television series South Park, and the 70th episode of the series overall. "Terrance and Phillip: Behind the Blow" originally aired on July 18, 2001 on Comedy Central. In the episode, the four boys learn that their idols, Terrance and Phillip, have split over credit issues. They try to get them back together in time for an upcoming festival, or else face death at the hands of a trio of unhinged environmental activists. The show Behind the Blow is a parody of the VH1 TV Show Behind the Music. The show also parodies Earth Day, portraying it as a "brainwashing festival."

== Plot synopsis ==
Kyle is watching the Terrance and Phillip Show with Stan, Cartman and Kenny, but it is a rerun. They are upset and complain, but an ad for a live show featuring Terrance and Phillip at the Denver Coliseum airs. They become excited to see the show, but at school the next morning, they find out that they will not be able to go because Earth Day is only a short time away, as three unscrupulous environmentalists who care about Earth Day brainwash people with the Jedi Mind Trick into believing what they say. Kyle, who got tickets for the four, eventually comes up with the idea of Terrance and Phillip performing at the Earth Day show, and everyone else agrees.

The day of the performance comes, and everyone who attends is shocked to find out that not only has Terrance become morbidly obese, but Phillip is not with him. Instead, there is a stand-in who performs with him, much to everyone's dismay. The boys manage to sneak in backstage, and demand to know what happened between the two performers. Terrance acknowledges that his stand-in is talentless, and tells them that he and Phillip have split up due to creative problems. They are in fact arguing over who deserves most of the credit for their show. Terrance informs the boys that Phillip is currently in Toronto, performing Canadian Shakespeare, but with or without him, he is willing to perform. The boys tell everyone at the Earth Day show about this issue. The environmentalists become violently angry, as they have already heavily promoted the appearance. The boys are told to go to Canada immediately to convince Phillip to perform, or face the consequences. The foursome travel to Toronto to see his performance in Hamlet, which they find exceptionally dull. They inform Phillip of the Earth Day show after the play ends, but he initially refuses when they mention Terrance will be in it. Kyle lies to Phillip by telling him that the people of South Park only want to see Phillip anyway, and not Terrance. This placates him and he agrees to come, but all four boys worry about what will happen when they both come across each other at the festival and begin to argue.

The boys try to explain the problem to the environmentalists, but they do not care, as they are incredibly committed to their job. They instead threaten to kill them and chop off Kenny’s left arm with a meat cleaver. Reluctantly, Terrance and Phillip agree to work together. During their rehearsal, they begrudgingly do a routine, which eventually boils down into an argument until they both leave in a huff. After the environmentalists chop Kenny's right arm off, the boys work together and present the audience with a documentary of Terrance and Phillip's rise and fall, featuring, among other clips, the duo appearing on The Ed Sullivan Show when they were children. While they are fascinated, the overreactive environmentalists become largely convinced that the boys "ruined" the festival once again, and they chase them, eventually chopping off Kenny's left leg. Terrance and Phillip watch the video from different viewpoints, and before they could leave the festival, they come across each other and reconcile.

The environmentalists corner the boys, chop off Kenny's right leg (rendering him completely limbless), and they almost kill the rest, but seeing Terrance and Phillip perform together finally convinces them to stop. This thrills everyone, including Kenny, who, despite mutilations, is nevertheless still alive and happy to see the duo reunited.

== Production ==
Parker and Stone came up with the idea for this episode, "Cartmanland," and "Towelie" at a restaurant in Hawaii right after finishing production on their other series That's My Bush! According to Parker, this was one of their first episodes clearly parodying liberals. The environmentalist with the butcher knife is based on Earth Day co-founder Ira Einhorn.

== Home media ==
"Terrance and Phillip: Behind the Blow," along with the thirteen other episodes from South Park: the Complete Fifth Season, was released on a three-disc DVD set in the United States on February 22, 2005. The sets include brief audio commentaries by Parker and Stone for each episode.
