= South Park: Bigger, Longer & Uncut =

1999 film directed by Trey Parker

- Theatrical release poster
- Directed by: Trey Parker
- Written by: Trey Parker; Matt Stone; Pam Brady
- Based on: South Park by: Trey Parker; Matt Stone
- Produced by: Trey Parker; Matt Stone
- Starring: Trey Parker; Matt Stone; Mary Kay Bergman; Isaac Hayes
- Edited by: John Venzon
- Music by: Marc Shaiman
- Production companies: Comedy Central; Scott Rudin Productions
- Distributed by: Paramount Pictures (United States and Canada); Warner Bros. (International)
- Release dates: June 23, 1999 (Grauman's Chinese Theatre); June 30, 1999 (United States)
- Running time: 81 minutes
- Country: United States
- Language: English
- Budget: $21 million (Note: Variety reported that $21 million was only the negative cost of making the film, excluding any distribution or promotional costs.)
- Box office: $83.1 million

South Park: Bigger, Longer & Uncut is a 1999 American animated black comedy film directed by Trey Parker, who co-wrote with Matt Stone and Pam Brady. The film is based on Parker and Stone's animated sitcom South Park, and stars Parker, Stone, Mary Kay Bergman, and Isaac Hayes, all of whom reprise their roles from the series, with George Clooney, Eric Idle, and Mike Judge in supporting roles. The plot follows Stan Marsh, Kyle Broflovski, Eric Cartman, and Kenny McCormick, whose frequent swearing leads to a moral panic in South Park that culminates in the United States declaring war on Canada.

Primarily centered on themes of censorship and scapegoating, the film also parodies and satirizes the animated films of the Disney Renaissance, musicals such as Les Misérables, and controversies surrounding the series itself. The film also heavily satirizes the Motion Picture Association of America; during production, Parker and Stone disputed with the MPAA, which returned the film multiple times with an NC-17 rating due to its frequent use of profanity. A musical film, it features original songs that Parker co-wrote with Marc Shaiman, who also composed the film score.

South Park: Bigger, Longer & Uncut premiered at Grauman's Chinese Theatre on June 23, 1999, and was released in the United States on June 30, by Paramount Pictures, and internationally by Warner Bros. It received positive reviews from critics, who praised its writing, humor, music, and themes. Produced on a $21 million budget, it grossed $83 million, becoming the highest-grossing R-rated animated film at the time. At the 72nd Academy Awards, the song "Blame Canada" was nominated for Best Original Song.

Since the film's release, it has become regarded as one of the greatest animated films of all time. (Note: Attributed to multiple references:)

== Plot ==
In South Park, Colorado, Stan Marsh, Kenny McCormick, Kyle Broflovski and his adopted brother Ike, and Eric Cartman, visit the movie theater to see Terrance and Phillip's R-rated film, Asses of Fire, bribing a homeless man to help sneak them in. Due to the rampant profanity in the film, the boys begin swearing constantly. Their classmates also see the film, but Wendy Testaburger prefers to spend time with transfer student Gregory, to Stan's jealousy. The boys are sent to Mr. Mackey's office for swearing and are forbidden from seeing the film again by their parents, but still do so again later. Kenny attempts to imitate one of the scenes from the film by lighting his fart on fire, but accidentally immolates himself. He is rushed to the hospital and dies from a botched heart transplant, and the other boys are consequently grounded.

Kenny descends into Hell and encounters Satan and his abusive partner Saddam Hussein. With Asses of Fire becoming popular with children nationwide, the parents of South Park blame Terrance and Phillip's native Canada for corrupting them. Kyle's mother, Sheila, forms the Mothers Against Canada (M.A.C.) movement with other parents. After Sheila catches Cartman singing an insulting song directed at her, she has him implanted with a V-chip that shocks him whenever he attempts to swear. When M.A.C. arrests Terrance and Phillip, Canada bombs the Baldwin family in retaliation. The United States declares war on Canada and arranges to have Terrance and Phillip executed during a USO show within two days. In Hell, Kenny overhears Satan tell Saddam that Terrance and Phillip's deaths are the last sign of a prophecy of his invasion of Earth. After failing to persuade Satan to abandon Saddam, Kenny's ghost visits Cartman to warn him. Unable to reason with their mothers, Stan, Kyle, and Cartman form "La Resistance" with their classmates to rescue Terrance and Phillip. Gregory takes charge of La Resistance, assigning Stan, Kyle, and Cartman to infiltrate the USO show with the French-accented, misotheistic Cristophe, nicknamed "the Mole".

Stan and Kyle attempt to stall the execution and Cartman attempts to deactivate the alarm while the Mole prepares to free Terrance and Phillip. However, Kenny's ghost reappears before Cartman, who runs away in fear before he can shut down the alarm, resulting in the Mole being fatally mauled by guard dogs. The remaining boys try to warn their mothers about Satan's prophecy but are ignored, and Sheila begins the execution. The Canadian Army suddenly launches a surprise attack, resulting in a massive battle between the two armies. Cartman deactivates the switch powering the electric chairs, allowing Terrance and Phillip to escape; the shock from the switch causes his V-chip to malfunction. Horrified at what they have incited, all the M.A.C. members except for Sheila decide to abandon their cause and search for their children. The children form a human shield to protect Terrance and Phillip from the United States Army as Kyle fails to reason with Sheila. While the army troops begin to back down, Sheila refuses and shoots Terrance and Phillip dead.

Satan's prophecy is fulfilled, and he and Saddam rise to Earth, but Saddam orders the soldiers of both armies to bow to him and browbeats Satan into letting him have power. Cartman, seeing his malfunctioning V-chip start to produce electric bolts when he swears, uses it to subdue Saddam. Saddam demands Satan assist him while insulting him, eventually causing Satan to snap and throw Saddam back into Hell, where he is impaled on a stalagmite. Grateful for Kenny's support, Satan grants him one wish, and Kenny wishes for everything to return to a pre-war state, though doing so means that he will remain in Hell. Kenny bids farewell to his friends and all of those killed in the battle are resurrected, including Terrance and Phillip. As the Americans and Canadians make peace, Sheila reconciles with Kyle, as does Wendy with Stan. For his sacrifice, Kenny is allowed to enter Heaven.

== Cast ==
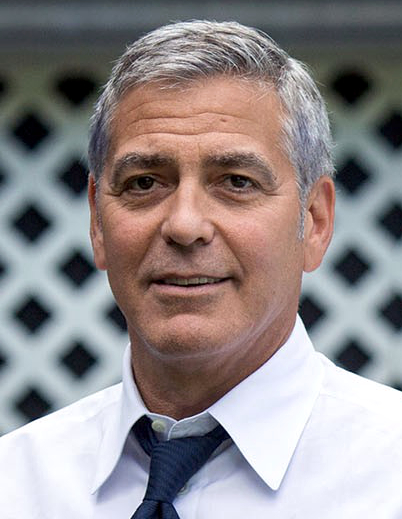
George Clooney voices Dr. Gouache.

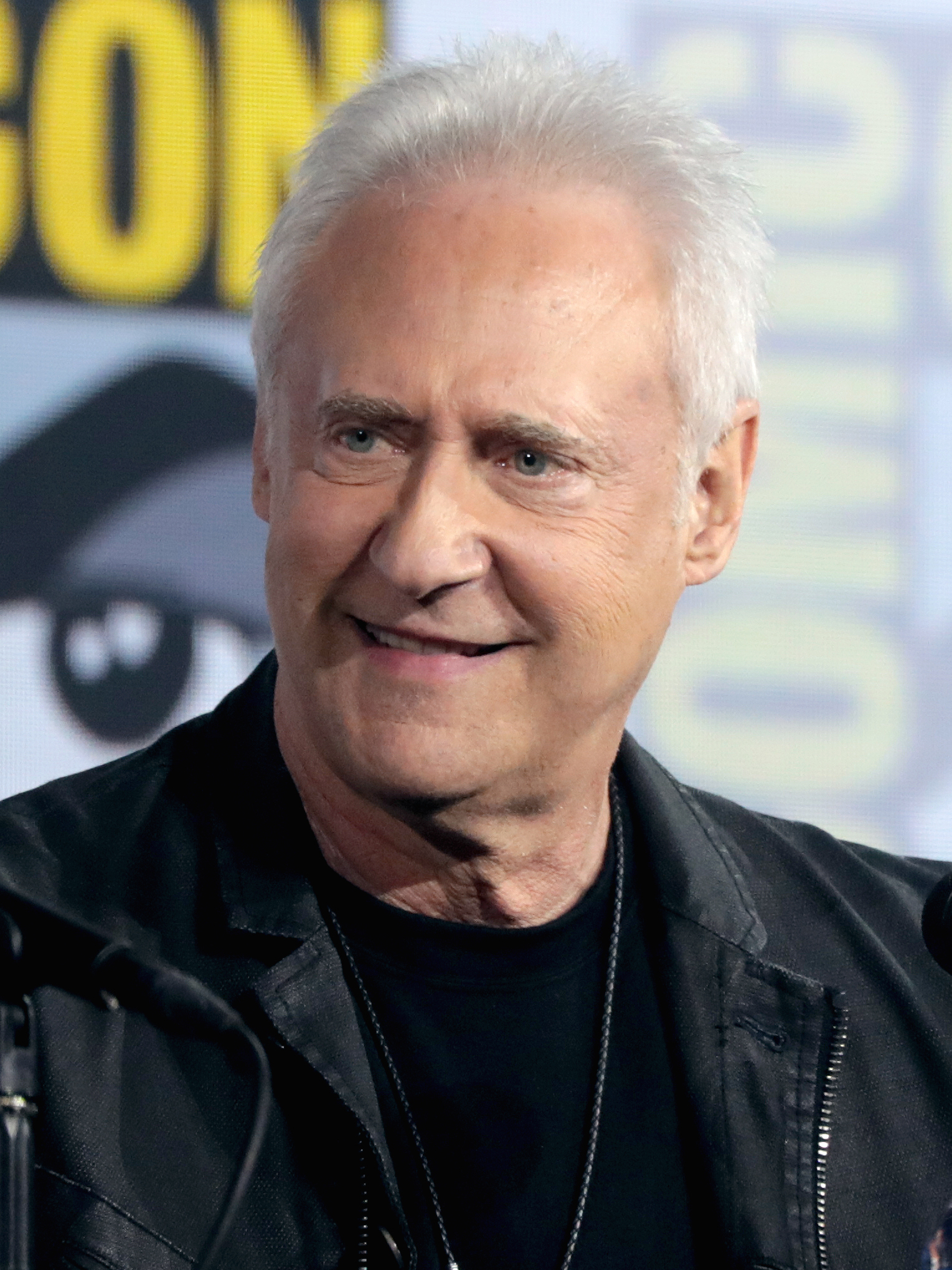
Brent Spiner voices Conan O'Brien.

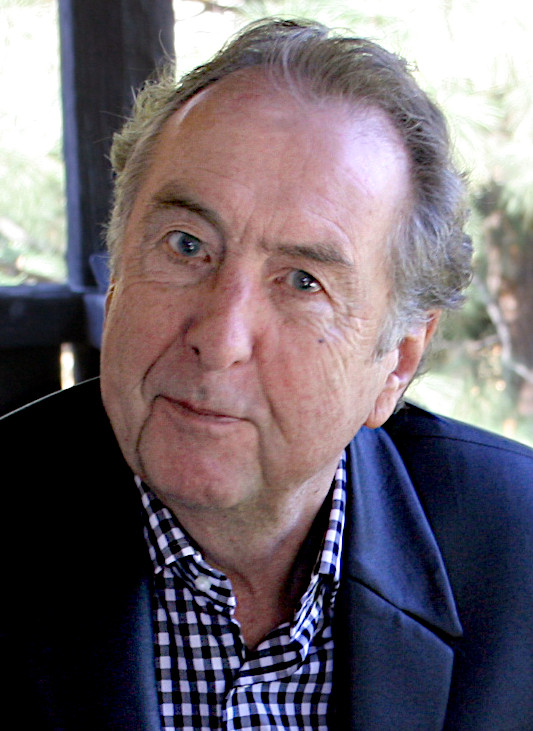
Eric Idle voices Dr. Vosknocker.

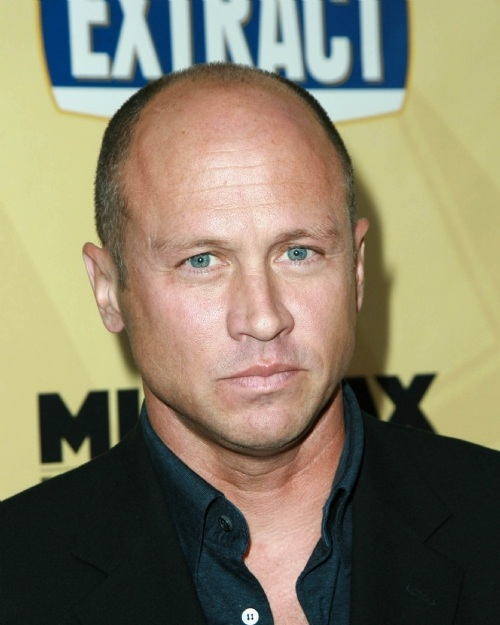
Mike Judge voices Kenny unmuffled.

- Trey Parker as Stan Marsh / Eric Cartman / Gregory / Satan / Mr. Garrison / Mr. Hat / Phillip Niles Argyle / Randy Marsh / Clyde Donovan / Tom – News Reporter / Midget in a Bikini / Bill Clinton / Canadian Ambassador / Bombardiers / Mr. Mackey / Army General / Ned Gerblansky / Bill Allen / Fosse McDonald / Christophe – Ze Mole (or The Mole) / Big Gay Al (singing voice) / Adolf Hitler / additional voices
- Matt Stone as Kyle Broflovski / Kenny McCormick (Muffled) / Saddam Hussein (credited to "Himself") / Terrance Henry Stoot / Big Gay Al (speaking voice) / Ticket Taker / Stuart McCormick / Jimbo Kearn / Gerald Broflovski / Butters Stotch / American Ambassador / additional voices
- Mary Kay Bergman as Sheila Broflovski / Liane Cartman / Sharon Marsh / Carol McCormick / Wendy Testaburger / Clitoris / additional voices
- Isaac Hayes as Chef Jerome McElroy
- Jesse Howell, Anthony Cross-Thomas and Franchesca Clifford as Ike Broflovski (Franchesca Clifford was credited as "Francesca Clifford")
- Bruce Howell as Man in Theatre
- Deb Adair as Woman in Theatre
- Jennifer Howell as Bebe Stevens
- George Clooney as Dr. Gouache ("Dr. Doctor" on screen)
- Brent Spiner as Conan O'Brien
- Minnie Driver as Brooke Shields
- Dave Foley as the Baldwin brothers
- Eric Idle as Dr. Vosknocker
- Nick Rhodes as Canadian Fighter Pilot
- Toddy E. Walters as Winona Ryder
- Stewart Copeland as American Soldier #1
- Stanley G. Sawicki as American Soldier #2
- Mike Judge as Kenny McCormick (Unmuffled)

== Production ==
=== Development ===
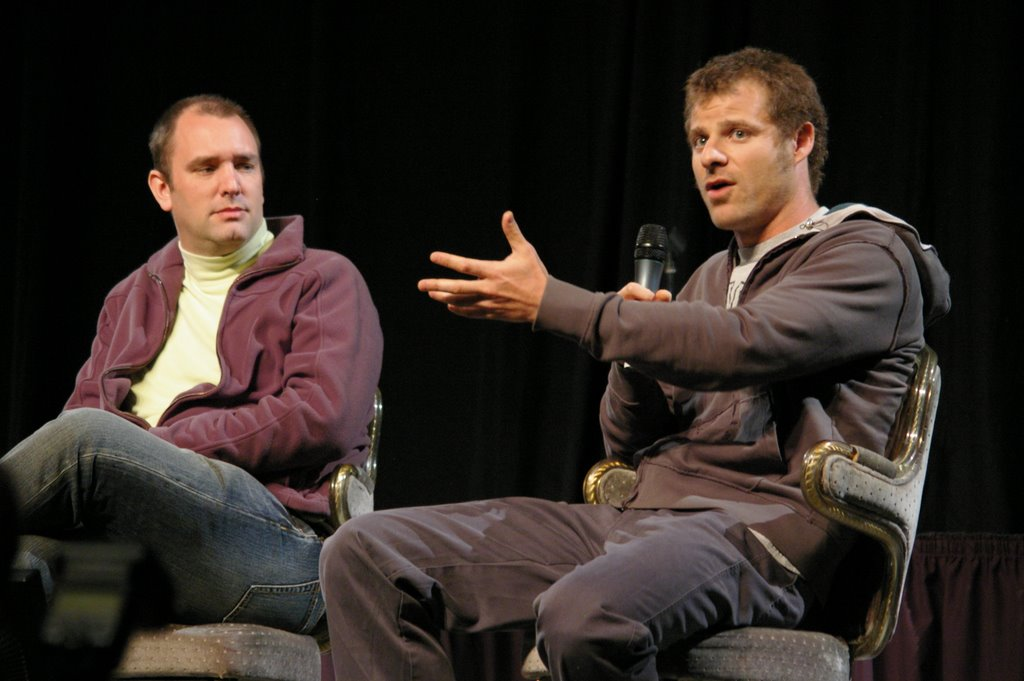
South Park co-creators Trey Parker and Matt Stone co-wrote South Park: Bigger, Longer & Uncut, while Parker directed the film.

Development for the film began during production of South Park's first season in January 1998. Co-creators Trey Parker and Matt Stone signed a deal with Comedy Central that April which contracted the duo to produce episodes until 1999, as well as an unspecified amount to produce a film based on the series. Part of Parker and Stone's conditions were that the film must at least receive an R rating, keeping it in line with the series' humor and its predecessor short films both titled The Spirit of Christmas. Parker stated that their desire was to approach the film from a more creative perspective and do more than a simple feature-length episode. Despite alleged pressure from studio executives to tone down the film, Parker and Stone's conditions were ultimately honored by Paramount Pictures.

"They really wanted to be able to go beyond the South Park television show", Comedy Central spokesman Tony Fox reported to TV Guide. "They really fought hard for and won the right to make an R-rated movie". Paramount executives went as far as preparing graphs displaying how much more revenue a PG-13-rated South Park film would potentially generate. The William Morris Agency, which represented Parker and Stone, pushed for the film's production to begin as soon as possible, while public interest was still high, instead of several years into its run, as was the case with Beavis and Butt-Head Do America (1996).

=== Casting ===
As in the television series, most of the characters are voiced by Parker, Stone, and Mary Kay Bergman. Isaac Hayes reprised his role as Chef, and audio samples of staff children Jesse Howell, Anthony Cross-Thomas and Franchesca Clifford were used for the voice of Ike Broflovski. Guest voices for the film include George Clooney as Dr. Gouache, Brent Spiner as Conan O'Brien, Minnie Driver as Brooke Shields, Eric Idle as Dr. Vosnocker, and Dave Foley as brothers Alec, Billy, Daniel and Stephen Baldwin.

Michael McDonald, who performs the closing track "Eyes of a Child", performs Satan's high notes in "Up There", and Howard McGillin provides Gregory's singing voice in "La Résistance (Medley)". Former The Police drummer Stewart Copeland voices a United States Army soldier. Mike Judge, creator of Beavis and Butt-Head and King of the Hill, provides Kenny's voice in his sole speaking appearance at the end of the film. Although initially denied by Paramount, Metallica vocalist James Hetfield performs the track "Hell Isn't Good", which was confirmed by Parker in the 2009 Blu-ray commentary.

=== Writing ===
The first season episode "Death" heavily influenced the film's screenplay; both plots center on the parents of South Park protesting Terrance and Phillip due to the perceived negative influence it has over their children. Parker stated, "After about the first year of South Park, Paramount already wanted to make a South Park movie, and we sort of thought this episode would make the best model just because we liked the sort of pointing at ourselves kind of thing." During this time, the team was also busy with the second and third seasons of the series, the former of which Parker and Stone later described as "disastrous". As such, perceiving that the initial fervor would wane, they decided to write the film as a personal, fully committed musical.

=== Animation ===
The film was animated using Alias/Wavefront PowerAnimator, running on SGI O2 and Octane workstations. Characters and individual scene elements were designed with texture mapping and shading that, when rendered, resemble the cutout animation of the short films and the series' first episode, "Cartman Gets an Anal Probe". The animation crew used a multiprocessor SGI Origin 2000 and 31 multiprocessor Origin 200 servers for both rendering and asset management. Backgrounds, characters and other items could be saved separately or as fully composited scenes, with convenient access at later points. "By creating flat characters and backgrounds in a 3D environment, we are able to add textures and lighting effects that give the film a cut-out construction paper stop-motion style which would have taken many more months if done traditionally," stated line producer Gina Shay. By the fifth season, the series transitioned to Alias Maya. The studio now runs a 120-processor render farm that can produce 30 or more shots per hour. The animation of South Park: Bigger, Longer, & Uncut is therefore seen as an example of how South Park's visual quality has improved in recent seasons. In the audio commentary on the 2009 Blu-ray release, Stone and Parker criticize how "bad and time consuming" the animation was during that time. IGN described the animation as "fall[ing] somewhere within the middle ground—not quite cardboard cutouts, but not quite fully computerized either." Nate Boss, in a review for High-Def Digest, commented, "There is no comparing the two, as the movie has a classic (for South Park, at least) animated feel, so full of the cut-outs we have grown to love, while the newer seasons sport a more computer processed feel." The film, compared to the series at the time of its production, was animated in widescreen (1.66:1). "Although the 'primitive' animation of South Park is supposedly a joke, it's really a secret weapon," wrote Stephanie Zacharek of Salon. "The simplicity of Parker and Stone's technique is what makes it so effective".

=== Post-production ===
The crew alternated between the film and the series, pushing both to scheduling extremes; changes to the film were made as late as two weeks before its release as the crew continually disputed with Paramount: "They wanted a Disney kind of trailer. We said no. They put together a totally un-South Park MTV video for the song 'What Would Brian Boitano Do?'. We had to go make our own version." Paramount's first trailer for the film advertised it, according to Parker, as "the laughiest movie of the summer", and promoted it in a way that South Park "was completely against". Parker and Stone told the studio of their dissatisfaction with the trailer, and upon the creation of a second trailer with minimal changes, the two broke the videocassette in half before returning it to the studio. "It was war," said Stone in 2000. "They were saying, 'Are you telling us how to do our job?' And I was going, 'Yes, because you're fucking stupid and you don't know what you're doing.'" In another instance, Paramount used the film's songs to create a music video for MTV. In accordance with broadcast standards, various parts were edited out; Parker described the final result as a "horrible little medley with all humor absent". The studio sent the original tape to Parker and Stone over the weekend with plans to send it to MTV on Monday to prepare it for a Wednesday airdate. Instead, Stone took the tape home, and Paramount threatened to sue Parker and Stone in response. Parker also noted that the title is an innuendo, and that "they (the MPAA) just didn't get it". The film was originally titled South Park: All Hell Breaks Loose, but was changed when the MPAA objected to the use of the word hell. Parker later revealed that the final title, which he personally considered worse, doubles as a reference to an uncircumcised penis.

== Music ==
"Mountain Town" (sample)
"Mountain Town"; the opening number for the film, has been compared to musicals such as Beauty and the Beast and Oklahoma! as it described the setting of the film.

The film's songs were written by Parker and the film's score composer Marc Shaiman. The fourteen songs in the film recall various Broadway musicals. The soundtrack also parodies many familiar Disney conventions, with several songs spoofing such films as Beauty and the Beast and The Little Mermaid. "Mountain Town" has been compared to Oklahoma! and Beauty and the Beast's "Belle", while "La Résistance (Medley)" was favorably compared to Les Misérables. "I'm Super" recalls "Be Our Guest" and South Pacific's "Honey Bun", and "Kyle's Mom's a Bitch" echoes Chitty Chitty Bang Bang; "Up There", "I Can Change" and the "Mountain Town (Reprise)" recall The Little Mermaid's "Part of Your World", "Poor Unfortunate Souls" and "Part of Your World (Finale)"; and "Uncle Fucka" also drew comparisons to Oklahoma!, particularly in its coda. "Hell Isn't Good", which accompanies Kenny's descent to Hell, was sung by an uncredited James Hetfield.

The soundtrack received critical acclaim, with Entertainment Weekly describing it as "a cast album that gleefully sends up all the Hollywood musical conventions we're being deprived of". The soundtrack was released June 15, 1999, by Atlantic Records. "Blame Canada" was frequently highlighted as one of the best songs in the album and was nominated for the Academy Award for Best Original Song. "I was like, 'We're going to get nominated for an Academy Award for this.' I really was," Parker said. "I even told him [Shaiman]." Shaiman spoke of the song, "We're making fun of people who pick ridiculous targets to blame anything about what's going on in their lives, so Canada was just the perfect, ridiculous, innocuous choice for a target." In 2011, Time called the soundtrack the "finest, sassiest full-movie musical score since the disbanding of the Freed unit at MGM."

== Release ==
The film's rating was lowered to R from an initial NC-17 following multiple appeals; some theaters stationed their ushers in front of their entrances to prevent underage patrons from sneaking into the film.

Paramount Pictures and Warner Bros. (whose respective parent companies Viacom and Time Warner Entertainment via HBO formerly jointly owned Comedy Central) collaborated in distributing the film; Paramount released the film in the United States, while Warner Bros. distributed the film internationally.

The film was rated R for "pervasive vulgar language and crude sexual humor, and for some violent images" by the Motion Picture Association of America. The board's objections to the film were described in highly specific terms in private memos by Paramount executives. The MPAA initially insisted on the more prohibitive NC-17 rating. Of the six times the film was screened to the MPAA, it was designated NC-17 after five screenings, the last of which was two weeks before its scheduled release. A marketing agent from Paramount called Parker and Stone and explained that the studio "needed" an R. In response, Stone contacted executive producer Scott Rudin, who in turn called a Paramount executive and, in Stone's words, "freaked out on them". The film's rating was lowered to R the following day, with the original film intact. "The ratings board only cared about the dirty words; they're so confused and arbitrary," said Parker to The New York Times. "They didn't blink twice because of violence." During production of the film's trailer, the MPAA objected to certain words but found no issue with a scene in which soldiers are shot dead. "They had a problem with words, not bullets," he said. The MPAA gave Paramount specific notes for the film; in contrast, Parker and Stone's NC-17-rated Orgazmo, released in 1998 by Rogue Pictures, was not given any specifications on how to be acceptable for an R rating. One of these notes stated that if the script exceeded 400 swear words, the movie would be given an NC-17 rating. Parker and Stone responded to this by using 399. The duo attributed the R rating to the fact that Paramount and Warner Bros. are both members of the MPAA; the former denied these claims.

As predicted through the characters' actions in the film, there were numerous news reports of underage patrons unsuccessfully attempting to sneak into the film. There were also reports of adolescents seeing the film under the pretense of purchasing tickets to Warner Bros.' Wild Wild West, which was released on the same date. This was a result of an industry-wide crackdown on such attempts, as proposed by President Bill Clinton in response to the moral panic generated by the Columbine High School massacre two months before the film's release. The film was cited, along with American Pie, as an explicit film released in the summer of 1999 tempting underage youth to sneak into theaters. There were similar reports of the film attracting an underage crowd when the film was released in the United Kingdom in August 1999.

In the aftermath of Columbine in relation to the film's release, Parker was questioned whether he felt "youth culture [was] under fire", to which he commented: "[I]t's amazingly strange, because that climate is what the movie is all about, and we wrote it more than a year ago. So when [Columbine] happened, we were like, 'Wow.' What we wrote about in this movie came true in terms of people's attitudes. The movie is also about war, and then that happened, too." Hayes responded to conservatives urging prudishness as a cure for society's ills: "If we give in to that and allow [entertainment] to become a scapegoat, you might wind up living in who-knows-what kind of state... If you believe in [your artistic vision] and you've got a moral conviction, take it to 'em!" The rating of the film later brought comparisons to Stanley Kubrick's Eyes Wide Shut, which was released in theaters in a digitally altered and censored version two weeks after South Park; the original cut was rated NC-17 before Warner Bros. altered it to ensure an R rating. In response to these debates and controversy, Stone called the MPAA a "bumbling, irresponsible organization".

The film was theatrically re-released for two nights by Fathom Events on June 23 and June 26, 2024, to coincide with the film's 25th anniversary.

=== Promotion ===
Paramount's licensing arm significantly expanded retail distribution beyond specialty stores (Hot Topic, Spencer's) to major retailers (Target, J.C. Penney), which involved carefully stripping T-shirts of objectionable material. Licensing industry observers credited Comedy Central with carving out a profitable niche in an industry dominated by partnerships linking fast-food restaurants and major film studios, which was particularly difficult for South Park, as fast-food chains did not want to associate with the series' content. Eventually, J.C. Penney ended its South Park tie-ins in April 1999 as a result of customer complaints. In July 1999, Parker and Stone appeared on Late Night with Conan O'Brien to promote the film's release. During the interview, Parker and Stone showed a clip of the film in which O'Brien (Brent Spiner) hands over Terrance and Phillip to the US government before committing suicide. Upon seeing the clip, O'Brien responded that his interns thought that it was "really funny", but were annoyed that the Late Night set was portrayed as on the top floor of the GE Building, when it was really on the sixth floor. The film also suffered negative publicity before release. It was initially reported that on the day of the Columbine massacre, a friend of the perpetrators, Chris Morris, was seen wearing a black T-shirt depicting characters from South Park. Both Parker and Stone are from Colorado, and Stone attended the nearby Heritage High School. Following the massacre, Stone took a three-day sabbatical: "Nothing seemed funny after that", he said. South Park was also, at the time, generally waning in popularity: ratings dropped nearly 40 percent with the premiere of the third season and, according to Entertainment Weekly, "it [wasn't] the pop-culture behemoth it was last year [1998]". In response to the decline, Parker commented, "Suddenly we suck and we're not cool anymore. The funny thing is, last year we were saying the same things and we were hip, fresh, and cute. Now they're telling us we're pushing 30, we're failures, and we're sellouts."

=== Home media ===
The film was released on DVD in the US on November 23, 1999, with a VHS release initially exclusively as a rental. A traditional retail VHS release was issued on May 16, 2000. The DVD contained three theatrical trailers for special features, which many criticized as being typical of "bare-bones" DVD releases. A LaserDisc release was issued on January 18, 2000; this release is markedly rare, as it was issued late in the format's lifespan. The film was re-released on Blu-ray on June 30, 2009, ten years after its theatrical release. In addition to the trailers, this release featured an audio commentary from Parker and Stone and a special "What Would Brian Boitano Do?" music video. This release was sourced from the original film negative, which resulted in audio sync issues. IGN's Scott Lowe explained, "Although clearly aged, South Park: Bigger, Longer, and Uncut looks great and is free of the washed out, compressed imperfections of previous standard definition releases of the film." However, Michael Zupan of DVDTalk notes that an automatic digital scratch removal process may have inadvertently removed some intentional lines from the picture, notably during Cartman's first scene with the V-chip. In the commentary, Parker and Stone, as well as other crew members, reveal that they had no recollection of making the film due to heavy scheduling. The film was released on 4K Ultra HD Blu-ray on June 25, 2024.

== Reception ==
=== Box office ===
On a $21 million budget, South Park: Bigger, Longer & Uncut opened at number four behind Wild Wild West, Big Daddy, and Tarzan, with a gross of $14,783,983 over the four-day Independence Day weekend from 2,128 theaters for an average of $6,947 per theater ($11,090,000 and an average of $5,211 over three days) and a total of $19,637,409 since its Wednesday launch. It dropped to eighth place in its second weekend, grossing $7.1 million. It went on to gross $52,037,603 in the United States and Canada, with the 3-day opening making up 22% of the final domestic gross. It made an additional $31.1 million internationally for a total of $83,137,603 worldwide.

=== Critical response ===
On Rotten Tomatoes, South Park: Bigger, Longer & Uncut has an 81% approval rating based on reviews from 99 critics. The website's consensus states: "Its jokes are profoundly bold and rude but incredibly funny at the same time." On Metacritic it has a score of 73 out of 100 based on reviews from 31 critics, indicating "generally favorable reviews". Audiences surveyed by CinemaScore gave the film a grade "B−" on scale of A to F.

Rita Kempley of The Washington Post described it as "outrageously profane" and "wildly funny", writing that "While censorship is the filmmakers' main target […] [Parker and Stone's] favorite monster is the Motion Picture Association of America, self-appointed guardians of the nation's chastity. It's all in good dirty fun and in service of their pro-tolerance theme." Stephen Holden of The New York Times regarded the film's "self-justifying moral" as "about mass entertainment, censorship and freedom of speech." He also praised Cartman's subjection to the V-chip as "the movie's sharpest satirical twist, reminiscent of A Clockwork Orange". Entertainment Weekly graded the film an A− and commended the film's message in a post-Columbine society, as well as the musical numbers, which "brilliantly parody / honor the conventions of Broadway show tunes and, especially, the Disney-formula ditties that began with Alan Menken and Howard Ashman." Writing for The Washington Post, Michael O'Sullivan neutrally regarded the film's offensive nature, commenting "Yes, the lampooning is more broad than incisive, but under the bludgeoning of this blunt instrument very few sacred cows are left standing." Reviewing the film for Time, Richard Corliss wrote that "you may laugh yourself sick – as sick as this ruthlessly funny movie is." Corliss later named the film his fifth favorite animated film of all time.

The film also had detractors, without noting the conservative family groups offended by the film's humor. Jack Mathews of the Daily News suggested the film's running time made Parker and Stone "run out of ideas". Roger Ebert stated that the "vicious social satire" of the film both "offended" and "amazed" him. Ebert rated the film 2 1/2 of 4 stars, calling it "the year's most slashing political commentary", but also wrote that "it is too long and runs out of steam, but it serves as a signpost for our troubled times. Just for the information it contains about the way we live now, thoughtful and concerned people should see it. After all, everyone else will."

=== Accolades ===
South Park: Bigger, Longer & Uncut was nominated for an Academy Award for Best Original Song for "Blame Canada". As a joke, Parker and Stone attended the 72nd Academy Awards ceremony in drag. It was later revealed on 6 Days to Air that they were high on LSD during the pre-show and the ceremony. When "Blame Canada" was scheduled to be performed, ABC requested that lyrics be written to comply with their S&P department. "It would be ironic to have to change the words in a movie about censorship," remarked Shaiman. The department was particularly critical of the song's use of the word fuck and allusions to the Ku Klux Klan. When Parker and Shaiman declined these requests, Robin Williams, a friend of Shaiman's, performed the song with black tape over his mouth and turned his back when profanities were sung. The award ultimately went to Phil Collins' "You'll Be in My Heart", as featured in Tarzan. In response, Parker and Stone ridiculed him in two consecutive episodes of the series' fourth season: "Cartman's Silly Hate Crime 2000" and "Timmy 2000". In the DVD commentary for the latter episode, Parker states that they were "fully expecting to lose, just not to Phil Collins".

List of awards and nominations
Award / Film Festival	Date of ceremony	Category	Recipients	Result
Academy Awards	March 26, 2000	Best Original Song	Trey Parker; Marc Shaiman; for "Blame Canada"	Nominated
Annie Awards	November 6, 1999	Outstanding Achievement in an Animated Theatrical Feature	South Park: Bigger, Longer & Uncut	Nominated
Annie Awards	November 6, 1999	Outstanding Individual Achievement for Voice Acting in an Animated Feature Production	Mary Kay Bergman	Nominated
Annie Awards	November 6, 1999	Outstanding Individual Achievement for Writing in an Animated Feature Production	Trey Parker; Matt Stone; Pam Brady	Nominated
American Film Foundation	March 2, 2000	E Pluribus Unum Award for Feature Film	South Park: Bigger, Longer & Uncut	Nominated
Chicago Film Critics Association	March 13, 2000	Best Original Score	Trey Parker; Marc Shaiman	Won
Las Vegas Film Critics Society Awards	January 10, 2000	Best Animated Film	South Park: Bigger, Longer & Uncut	Nominated
Los Angeles Film Critics Association	January 19, 2000	Best Music	Trey Parker; Marc Shaiman	Won
MTV Movie Awards	June 3, 2000	Best Musical Sequence	Terrance and Phillip – "Uncle Fucka"	Won
Motion Picture Sound Editors	March 25, 2000	Best Sound Editing - Music - Animation	Dan DiPrima; Tim Boyle; Dennis S. Sands; Brian Bulman	Won
Motion Picture Sound Editors	March 25, 2000	Best Sound Editing - Animated Feature	South Park: Bigger. Longer & Uncut	Nominated
New York Film Critics Circle Awards	January 9, 2000	Best Animated Film	South Park: Bigger, Longer & Uncut	Won
OFTA Film Awards	2000	Best Music, Original Score	Trey Parker and Marc Shaiman	Won
OFTA Film Awards	2000	Best Animated Picture	Trey Parker	Nominated
OFTA Film Awards	2000	Best Music, Adapted Song	"Kyle's Mom's a Bitch"	Nominated
Online Film Critics Society Awards	January 2, 2000	Best Original Score	Marc Shaiman	Won
Golden Satellite Awards	January 16, 2000	Best Motion Picture, Animated or Mixed Media	South Park: Bigger, Longer & Uncut	Nominated
Golden Satellite Awards	January 16, 2000	Best Original Song	"Mountain Town"	Nominated
Village Voice Film Poll	2000	Best Film	South Park: Bigger, Longer & Uncut	10th place

The film is recognized by American Film Institute in these lists:

- 2004: AFI's 100 Years...100 Songs:
  - "Blame Canada" – Nominated
- 2006: AFI's Greatest Movie Musicals – Nominated
- 2008: AFI's 10 Top 10:
  - Nominated Animation Film

=== Lists and records ===
- The film has been nominated by the American Film Institute for their list of the Greatest American Musicals.
- In 2000, readers of Total Film magazine voted the film at No. 13 in the greatest comedy films of all time.
- In 2001, Terry Gilliam selected it as one of the ten best animated films of all time.
- In 2006, South Park finished fifth on the United Kingdom Channel 4's "50 Greatest Comedy Films" vote.
- Readers of Empire, in a 2006 poll, voted it No. 166 in the greatest films of all time.
- In 2008, the film was included in Entertainment Weekly's list of the "25 Movie Sequels We'd Line Up to See" and "The Funniest Movies of the Past 25 Years".
- The film is No. 5 on Bravo's 100 Funniest Movies.
- IGN named it the sixth greatest animated film of all time in their Top 25 list.
- In 2011, Time named it the sixth greatest animated feature of all time.
- In 2021, it was listed as one of the best animated films of all time by Complex.

== Legacy ==
Following its release, MPAA president Jack Valenti stated that he regretted not giving the film an NC-17 rating. In 2000, in response to the film's controversy, the MPAA began using specific descriptions for a film's rating on posters and in advertisements. The film's use of profanity earned it a 2001 Guinness World Record for "Most Swearing in an Animated Movie" (399 profanities, including 139 uses of fuck; 128 offensive gestures; and 221 acts of violence).

In the song "Uncle Fucka", fuck is said 31 times. Throughout 2000, Blink-182 often ended songs on their The Mark, Tom and Travis Show Tour with lines from "Uncle Fucka". The lines can be heard on the band's live album, The Mark, Tom, and Travis Show (The Enema Strikes Back!).

While the actual Saddam Hussein was on trial for genocide charges in 2006, Stone joked that the U.S. military was repeatedly showing Saddam the film as a form of torture. Parker and Stone were given a signed photo of Saddam by American soldiers.

=== Subsequent film development ===
In 2007, during development of the "Imaginationland" trilogy, Parker and Stone described the possibility of producing it as a film but ultimately abandoned these plans amid a demanding production schedule. Parker and Stone said in a 2008 interview that a theatrically released sequel would most likely be what concludes the series.

In 2011, when the official South Park website FAQ was asked whether a sequel would be made, it was replied to with, "the first South Park movie was so potent, we're all still recovering from the blow. Unfortunately, at the current moment, there are no plans for a second South Park movie. But you never know what the future may bring, crazier things have happened..."

In 2013, Warner Bros. relinquished its rights to co-finance any further South Park films during their negotiations to co-finance Christopher Nolan's Interstellar. Previous efforts to produce another South Park film were complicated by both Paramount and Warner Bros. retaining certain rights to the IP. The deal mentioned that Paramount had the next five years to develop another film or else Warner Bros. regains the rights. It never came to be so Warner Bros. continues to share them with Paramount.

In August 2021, a series of 14 television specials was announced for Paramount+ as part of a multi-year deal with Parker and Stone, the first two of which premiered in November and December 2021. The projects were originally announced as films, which Parker and Stone later denied.

== See also ==
- Canada–United States relations
- List of films featuring fictional films
- List of musical films
- List of adult animated films
