= Cartmanland =

- South Park episode
- Episode no.: Season 5 Episode 6
- Directed by: Trey Parker
- Written by: Trey Parker
- Production code: 506
- Original air date: July 25, 2001

Episode chronology
← Previous "Terrance and Phillip: Behind the Blow"	Next → "Proper Condom Use"
- South Park season 5

"Cartmanland" is the sixth episode of the fifth season of the animated sitcom South Park, and the 71st episode overall. It first aired on Comedy Central in the United States on July 25, 2001.

In the episode, Eric Cartman inherits a million dollars from his deceased grandmother and uses it to purchase his own amusement park, which he names Cartmanland. The resulting success causes Kyle Broflovski to have a hemorrhoid and lose his faith in God.

== Plot ==
Eric Cartman's grandmother dies and leaves $1 million to him in her will. Rather than share it with his relatives, invest the money or donate it to charity, Cartman purchases North Park Funland, an amusement park owned by Frank Fun. As Frank signs the park over to Cartman, he admits it has been a financial failure. Cartman is not worried, as he plans to open the park exclusively for himself so he can avoid standing in long lines. The deal is finalized, and he changes the name of the park to Cartmanland.

Meanwhile, Kyle Broflovski begins to question his faith in God upon learning of Cartman's fortune, on account of the various atrocities Cartman has committed. The stress caused by this discovery also gives Kyle an inflamed hemorrhoid. He and Stan Marsh attempt to sneak into Cartmanland, defying Cartman's expulsion of any guests, but Kyle's hemorrhoid pops as he and Stan try to climb over the perimeter fence, and Cartman angrily sends them away. The hemorrhoid becomes infected, causing Kyle, who is now hospitalized, to fully lose his faith as his health begins to deteriorate. His parents attempt to cheer him up by telling him the Biblical story of Job, but they leave out the rest of the story, including the ending where Job receives even greater wealth and a happy family, leaving Kyle horrified that God would allow a good man to suffer so badly just to settle a dispute with Satan.

Cartman tries to hire a security guard for the park after what happened, but the man he chooses insists on receiving a salary instead of being paid in free rides. Having now spent his entire inheritance, Cartman has no choice but to let a few people into the park each day in order to pay the guard. Expenses for ride maintenance, refreshments, utilities, and added security begin to mount over the next few days, forcing Cartman to sell more and more tickets to cover them. Business experts misinterpret Cartman's attempts to keep the park to himself as a genius marketing ploy and the popularity of the park soars. Kyle falls deeper into despair upon hearing these reports and flatlines, losing all will to live.

Infuriated by the long lines of attendees that now fill the park, Cartman demands that Frank buy it back from him. Frank agrees and gives Cartman his money back. As Cartman is leaving the park, IRS agents intercept him and seize $500,000 of his money for failing to document the park's cash flow. The agents take the rest on behalf of Stuart and Carol McCormick, who have sued Cartman over their son Kenny's death on one of the rides. Finding himself $13,000 in debt, Cartman pleads for Frank to return the park to him, but Frank refuses due to the park's newfound success. Stan persuades Kyle's doctor to bring him to the park to see Cartman's miserable state as he rants, cries, and throws rocks and gets sprayed with pepper spray by the security guard he hired. As a crowd gathers to watch Cartman's misery, Kyle's hemorrhoid subsides and he almost instantly recovers, now with both his faith in God and will to live renewed.

== Production ==
In the DVD commentary for the episode, Parker and Stone highlight it as another example (after "Scott Tenorman Must Die") of the show's change in style towards simpler ideas which consist only of an A-Plot, with no subplot, and "not try[ing] to do too many things at once." Parker mentions that they almost did not make the episode, as they did not believe that there was enough story and that it was too "basic and easy." Parker also said they were concerned that the idea of Cartman inheriting a million dollars and buying a theme park was a cliché. However, as they were in the middle of the run and had no other stories ready for production, they decided to proceed with the idea. Parker said he realized while they were making the episode that "as long as you have the basic easy cliché thing as the overall thing, then you can get into the scenes and have a lot of fun with scenes and get original in there." Cartman figuring out how many visitors he needed to pay his staff was based on Sid Meier's Civilization.

The security guard whom Cartman hires, and who uses pepper spray, was previously the lead mall cop in the season four episode "Something You Can Do with Your Finger". He is also featured in the 2014 South Park video game The Stick of Truth as the first boss, guarding Tolkien Black's mansion and using his pepper spray on the player character unless they wear a gas mask. He also appears in the sequel of The Stick of Truth, The Fractured but Whole which was released in 2017.

== Home media ==
"Cartmanland," along with the thirteen other episodes from South Park: the Complete Fifth Season, was released on a three-disc DVD set on February 22, 2005. The sets include brief audio commentaries by Parker and Stone for each episode. Cartmanland was also released as part of The Cult of Cartman, a 2008 DVD compilation of Cartman-centric episodes.

Both this episode and "Scott Tenorman Must Die" appear on The Cult of Cartman compilation DVD, which was released in 2008.

== See also ==
- Theodicy
