= Kenny McCormick =

Fictional character in South Park

- South Park character
- First appearance: Jesus vs. Frosty (1992) (short)
- Created by: Trey Parker; Matt Stone
- Designed by: Trey Parker; Matt Stone
- Voiced by: Matt Stone (muffled and un-muffled as Mysterion); Eric Stough (un-muffled); Mike Judge (un-muffled in 1999 film and "South American Biker Gangs"); Trey Parker (Japanese)

In-universe information
- Full name: Kenneth McCormick
- Aliases: Kenny; Mysterion; El Pollo Loco; Lady McCormick; Princess Kenny; Dr. McCormick; Kenny McHeinenberg
- Gender: Male
- Occupation: Student, scientist (future)
- Family: Stuart McCormick (father); Carol McCormick (mother); Kevin McCormick (brother); Karen McCormick (sister)
- Significant others: Kelly (ex-girlfriend); Tammy Warner (ex-girlfriend)
- Relatives: Grandpa McCormick (paternal grandfather)
- Religion: Christianity (Roman Catholicism)
- Nationality: American
- Residence: South Park, Colorado, U.S.
- Died: Main Series: 99 deaths in regular episodes Shorts and Specials: 14 in shorts, 2 in television specials Film & Games: 2 in the feature film and 14 in video games Killed 128 times in total; see list

Kenneth McCormick is a fictional character and one of the four main protagonists in the adult animated sitcom South Park, alongside Stan Marsh, Kyle Broflovski, and Eric Cartman. His often muffled and incomprehensible speech—the result of his parka hood covering his mouth—is provided by co-creator Matt Stone. After early appearances in The Spirit of Christmas shorts in 1992 (Jesus vs. Frosty) and 1995 (Jesus vs. Santa), Kenny first appeared on television when South Park premiered on August 13, 1997 with the episode "Cartman Gets an Anal Probe". In the 1999 feature film South Park: Bigger, Longer & Uncut, he revealed his uncovered face and real voice for the first time, being provided by Beavis and Butt-Head and King of the Hill Creator Mike Judge. South Park producer Eric Stough provides Kenny's unmuffled voice since then, though Judge reprises his role for the first time in 27 years in the season 29 episode "South American Biker Gangs".

Kenny is a third- and later fourth-grade student who commonly has extraordinary experiences atypical of conventional small-town life in his hometown of South Park, Colorado, where he lives with his poverty-stricken family. Kenny is animated by computer to look as he did in the show's original method of cutout animation.

The character gained popularity from a running gag during the first five seasons of the series, whereby Kenny would suffer an excruciating death before returning alive and well in the next episode with little or no explanation. Stan would frequently use the catchphrase "Oh, my god! They killed Kenny!", followed by Kyle exclaiming, "You bastard(s)!". Since the sixth season in 2002, the practice of killing Kenny has been seldom used by the show's creators. Various episodes have set up the gag, sometimes presenting alternate explanations for Kenny's unacknowledged reappearances.

== Role in South Park ==
Kenny attends South Park Elementary as part of Mr. Garrison's fourth-grade class. During the first 58 episodes, Kenny and the other main child characters were in the third grade. Kenny comes from a poor, dysfunctional household, presided over by his alcoholic, unemployed father, Stuart. His mother Carol has a job washing dishes at Olive Garden. Kenny has an older brother named Kevin. He also has a younger sister who is shown with his family in the season nine episode "Best Friends Forever", but does not reappear until the 15th-season episode "The Poor Kid", where her name is revealed to be Karen, whom he loves unconditionally. Kenny is best friends with Stan Marsh, Kyle Broflovski, and Eric Cartman. Kenny is regularly teased for living in poverty, particularly by Cartman.

Kenny's superhero alter ego, Mysterion, first appeared in the season 13 episode "The Coon", as a rival to Eric Cartman's eponymous supervillain alter ego. He unmasks himself at the end of the episode, but his identity is left intentionally ambiguous to the viewer. He is not revealed to be Kenny until his third appearance, in the season 14 episode "Mysterion Rises".

== Deaths ==
Prior to season six, Kenny died in almost every episode. The nature of the deaths were often gruesome and portrayed in a comically absurd fashion, and usually followed by Stan yelling "Oh, my God! They killed Kenny!" with Kyle yelling "You bastard(s)!" Shortly afterward, rats would commonly appear and pick at his corpse. In the following episode, Kenny would reappear alive and well, usually without any explanation. Most characters appear oblivious or indifferent to the phenomenon, although occasionally one will acknowledge it. In "Cherokee Hair Tampons", Kenny gets irritated and offended when Stan laments Kyle's critical condition while utterly ignoring Kenny's past demises. Cartman commented on Kenny's deaths in the episode "Cartmanland" when he is being sued for unsafe rides insisting to attorneys representing his family that "Kenny? He dies all the time!" In "Mr. Hankey, the Christmas Poo", as the episode is about to end, the kids point out that "something feels unfinished", Kenny frets that he will die again, but the text "The End" appears upon the screen and Kenny celebrates, relieved; it is the first episode in the series where he survives.

Near the end of the production run of the show's fifth season, creators Trey Parker and Matt Stone contemplated having an episode in which Kenny was killed off permanently. The reasoning behind the idea was to genuinely surprise fans, and to allow an opportunity to provide a major role for Butters Stotch, a breakout character whose popularity was growing with the viewers and creators of the show. In the episode "Kenny Dies", Kenny dies after developing terminal muscular dystrophy, while Parker and Stone claimed that Kenny would not be returning in subsequent episodes. The duo insisted they grew tired of upholding the tradition of having Kenny die in each episode. Stone stated that thinking of humorous ways to kill the character was initially fun, but became more mundane as the series progressed. When they determined that it would be too difficult to develop the character because he was too much of a "prop", Parker and Stone finally decided to kill off Kenny permanently.

["Kenny Dies"] was the one episode where [all the characters] cared [he was dying] for once. After that, we said, "Why doesn't he just stay dead?" And it was like, "Okay, let's just do that." It was that easy of a decision. I think a lot of people probably haven't noticed. I couldn't care less. I am so sick of that character.

— Matt Stone, from a 2002 article in the Knoxville News-Sentinel

For much of season six, Kenny remained dead, though he still appears to possess Cartman's body from "A Ladder to Heaven" to "The Biggest Douche in the Universe" (resulting from an accident where Cartman mistook Kenny's ashes for chocolate milk mix and drank the resulting liquid), and both Stone and Parker entertained the idea of eventually bringing the character back. According to Stone, only a small minority of fans were significantly angered by Kenny's absence to threaten a boycott of the cable channel Comedy Central, on which South Park is aired. For most of the season, Stan, Kyle, and Cartman fill the void left by Kenny by allowing Butters and Tweek into their group, leading to these characters receiving more focus on the show; nevertheless, Kenny returned from the year-long absence in the season six finale "Red Sleigh Down", has remained a main character since, and has been given larger roles in episodes.

The first explanation given for Kenny's deaths and reappearances was given in the 53rd episode "Cartman Joins NAMBLA", wherein the McCormicks have a baby exactly like Kenny, including the characteristic orange parka, shortly after the former Kenny dies. Mr. McCormick exclaims, "God, this must be the fiftieth time this has happened", to which Mrs. McCormick quickly replies, "Fifty-second". This explanation is expanded upon in the season 14 episodes "Coon 2: Hindsight", "Mysterion Rises" and "Coon vs. Coon and Friends", in which Kenny, while playing superheroes with his friends, claims his "superpower" is immortality. He actually dies several times during these episodes—even committing suicide more than once—reawakening alive and unharmed in his bed each time. He is frustrated and angry that no one can remember him dying every time he regenerates and longs to know the source of his power, which he views as a curse. Unbeknownst to him, his parents were previously connected to a Cthulhu-worshipping death cult. After Kenny shoots himself the second time, Mrs. McCormick awakes with a scream, shrieks "It's happening again!", and minutes later, is shown gently placing a newborn Kenny in his bed. "We should never have gone to that stupid cult meeting," she grouses as she and her husband return to bed.

In "Put It Down", he is killed off-screen by a driver on his phone, as his picture is shown among those of kids killed by a driver on phone texting tribute. In "Bike Parade", Jeff Bezos tells Alexa to kill Kenny, and Cartman hauls his coffin while riding his bike in the parade. "The Pandemic Special" sees Kenny being gunned down by the police when they are equipped with military weaponry to deal with the children breaking free from COVID-19 quarantine.

In South Park: Post Covid, as a millionaire scientist in the future finding the cause of COVID-19, Kenny dies due to a time travel experiment that got him a variant named COVID Delta+ Rewards. This death is undone in South Park: Post Covid: The Return of Covid after Stan, Kyle, and Cartman time travel to the past. In the season 29 episode titled "South American Biker Gangs", Kenny was killed by an exploding bomb strapped onto his electric bicycle.

List of deaths
Episode	How?
101 – Cartman Gets an Anal Probe	Kenny survives a UFO gunshot and a panicked herd of cows, only to be run over by Officer Barbrady's police car as it chases the cows.
102 – Weight Gain 4000	Mr. Garrison attempts to kill Kathie Lee Gifford with a sniper rifle, but Cartman's weight collapses the stage that he, Kenny, and Kathie Lee are standing on, launching Kathie Lee out of the bullet’s path; the bullet hits Kenny, who goes flying and gets impaled through the head on a flagpole.
103 – Volcano	Almost crushed by a volcanic rock launched from the erupting volcano. Later, Ned drops his rifle, which accidentally fires and kills Kenny.
104 – Big Gay Al's Big Gay Boat Ride	During the elementary school football match between South Park and Middle Park, players on the Middle Park team rip Kenny’s arms off and subsequently decapitate him.
105 – An Elephant Makes Love to a Pig	Thrown into the microwave by a botched clone of Stan. Somehow, the microwave turns on by itself, cooking Kenny to death.
106 – Death	Touched by Death.
107 – Pinkeye	Crushed by Mir in the beginning. He later comes back as a zombie and is sawed in half by Kyle. At the end he comes out of his grave, but is immediately crushed by a statue and a crashing plane.
108 – Damien	Damien turns Kenny into a platypus, who is later shot dead by Jimbo after the fight between Jesus and Satan.
109 – Starvin' Marvin	Mutant turkeys maul Kenny and pull out his eye.
111 – Tom's Rhinoplasty	Impaled through the face and pinned to the classroom wall by a sword that slipped out of substitute teacher Miss Ellen's hand.
112 – Mecha-Streisand	Kenny starts playing tetherball, but the rope scoops him up, ties him to the pole, and asphyxiates him.
113 – Cartman's Mom is a Dirty Slut	Thrown onto railroad tracks by a go-kart, where a train runs him over.
202 – Cartman's Mom is Still a Dirty Slut	Electrocuted while fixing the hospital's backup generator.
203 – Chickenlover	Crushed by a tree.
204 – Ike's Wee Wee	Falls into an open grave; its gravestone falls in and crushes him.
205 – Conjoined Fetus Lady	During the South Park vs. China dodgeball game, a Chinese player throws a dodgeball at Kenny with such force that it sends him flying backwards into a wall, fatally crushing him against it.
206 – The Mexican Staring Frog of Southern Sri Lanka	Torn in half by audience members during a fight on the set of Jesus and Pals.
207 – City on the Edge of Forever	A large, black monster pulls Kenny out of the school bus, carries him away, and kills him offscreen. Also, in a flashback, Kenny is crushed against a wall by Arthur Fonzarelli riding a motorcycle. In another flashback to the episode Death, he instead kills Death, causing Stan and Kyle to modify the lines. (Stan: "Oh my god! Kenny...killed...Death!" Kyle: "You...bastard?")
208 – Summer Sucks	An oversized black snake firework becomes uncontrollable and causes a set of bleachers to collapse; Kenny is caught underneath the bleachers and crushed to death. In a flashback, Baby Kenny's head is blown off by a firecracker.
209 – Chef's Chocolate Salty Balls	Trampled to death by a group of people leaving the theater. Stan and Kyle don't say the famous lines, but two tourists do and the line is slightly modified. (Tourist 1: "Oh my god, I found a penny!" Tourist 2: "You bastard!")
210 – Chickenpox	Dies from chicken pox.
211 – Roger Ebert Should Lay off the Fatty Foods	Kenny's head explodes when Kyle and Stan turn up the intensity of the planetarium's special effects projector to maximum power.
212 – Clubhouses	Trampled to death in a mosh pit by partygoers during a party at Cartman's treehouse.
213 – Cow Days	The bull that Cartman is riding goes berserk and rams Kenny, impaling him on its horns.
214 – Chef Aid	During Ozzy Osbourne's performance, Ozzy bites Kenny's head off.
215 – Spookyfish	Mauled to death by Stan's goldfish from a parallel universe.
216 – Merry Christmas, Charlie Manson!	Shot dead by the police while attempting to surrender himself and Charles Manson to them.
217 – Gnomes	Crushed by a derailed mine cart inside of the Underpants Gnomes' secret lair.
218 – Prehistoric Ice Man	Caught by and dragged under the end of a moving walkway.
301 – Rainforest Shmainforest	Struck by lightning, but Kelly (a girl Kenny likes) manages to revive him with CPR.
302 – Spontaneous Combustion	Spontaneously combusts at the beginning of the episode; it is later revealed that this was caused by him holding in a fart.
303 – The Succubus	Dies for unknown reasons while the group are waiting for Chef, but suddenly comes back to life by sunrise. He is later crushed to death by Chef's succubus bride during the wedding.
304 – Jackovasaurs	Imitates a deer to distract Cartman. However, a bear mistakes him for a real deer and kills him.
305 – Tweek vs. Craig	Kenny's jacket gets caught in a sawblade, flinging him into a box of rusty nails.
306 – Sexual Harassment Panda	Kenny is handed a giant magnet which is attracted to a comically large electric fan; Kenny is pulled into the fan and is shredded to pieces.
309 – Jewbilee	Splits open a conch shell with his head to release the captive Moses.
310 – Korn's Groovy Pirate Ghost Mystery	Killed by a snowspeeder while wearing an ED-209 costume.
311 – Chinpokomon	Has an epileptic seizure while playing a Chinpokomon video game. At the end of the episode, his catatonic body bursts, revealing several rats inside feasting on his insides.
312 – Hooked on Monkey Phonics	Beaten to death by the Phonics Monkey in Cartman's room.
313 – Starvin' Marvin in Space	Frozen in carbonite by CIA agents and given to Sally Struthers.
314 – The Red Badge of Gayness	Set on fire by a US Army warning flare.
315 – Mr. Hankey's Christmas Classics	Crushed by a chandelier during the episode's final musical number, "Have Yourself a Merry Little Christmas".
316 – Are You There God? It's Me, Jesus	Explodes from the increased pressure of a tampon stuck in his buttocks.
317 – World Wide Recorder Concert	Fatally intense bowel movement after hearing "The Brown Note". (He is somehow seen alive and healthy with the other kids on the bus at the end.)
401 – The Tooth Fairy Tats 2000	Thrown into a river while wearing cement shoes. The riverbed is too shallow to drown in, but he drowns in a hidden ditch while trying to escape.
402 – Cartman's Silly Hate Crime 2000	Flies off a sled and is crushed by a pile of bricks meant as a substitute for Cartman's weight against a tree during a test run for a sled ahead of a race.
403 – Timmy 2000	Cartman hallucinates a Christina Aguilera-faced bug on Kenny's face and swats it with a frying pan, killing him.
404 – Quintuplets 2000	Accidentally shot dead in his mother's arms by a SWAT officer during an Elián González-style raid.
405 – Cartman Joins NAMBLA	Run over by an ambulance taking his father away. Earlier in the episode, Kenny also has a nightmare of being murdered by his newborn baby brother in the hospital delivery room.
406 – Cherokee Hair Tampons	Crushed by a falling piano after abandoning Stan.
407 – Chef Goes Nanners	Explodes after taking 60 antacid tablets – believing they were mints – and drinking water.
408 – Something You Can Do With Your Finger	Crushed by an elevator just before Fingerbang's performance at the mall.
409 – Do the Handicapped Go to Hell?	Hit by a bus while crossing the road. (He is shown to have survived this in the next episode.)
411 – Fourth Grade	Dragged across the road in a botched attempt to deactivate Timmy's modified wheelchair.
412 – Trapper Keeper	When Cartman, who has been transformed into a giant deformed monster by his Trapper Keeper, bursts out of his bedroom, the door is ripped from its frame and fatally crushes Kenny against the wall behind him.
413 – Helen Keller! The Musical	Crushed by a falling set light which Cartman rigged to hit Timmy's dysfunctional pet turkey Gobbles.
416 – The Wacky Molestation Adventure	Sacrificed in the "Carousel" ritual, which is not shown, although his corpse is found by Mark and Linda.
417 – A Very Crappy Christmas	Run over by a car.
501 – It Hits the Fan	Vomits his guts out and dies after surviving the plague brought on by mass overuse of the word "shit".
502 – Cripple Fight	Carried off by a bird of prey just as the boys are being thanked for their efforts.
503 – Super Best Friends	Drowns in the Reflecting Pool during the Cult of Blaintology's mass suicide. This is the first time that he has died while not wearing his parka.
504 – Scott Tenorman Must Die	Laughs himself to death after watching Cartman's "I'm a little piggy" video when Scott Tenorman shows it to the whole town.
506 – Cartmanland	Impaled through the face by a loose metal pipe while riding a roller coaster.
507 – Proper Condom Use	Kenny's face is sliced in half by a boomerang thrown by Bebe.
508 – Towelie	While trying to save the boys' Gamesphere, Kenny falls into a large smelting pot full of molten metal and is burned to death.
509 – Osama Bin Laden Has Farty Pants	When the boys, along with the four boys from Afghanistan whom they sent a dollar to, try to flee from Osama bin Laden's clutches in the midst of the ongoing war, an airstrike from American troops kills both Kenny and his Afghan lookalike.
510 – How to Eat With Your Butt	Run over by a motorcycle.
511 – The Entity	An airport security worker shoots Kenny in the head after finding a nail clipper in his pocket, believing him to be a terrorist.
512 – Here Comes The Neighborhood	Dies off-screen; his body is seen on a sled pulled by Craig Tucker.
513 – Kenny Dies	Kenny dies for good from a terminal illness. He is not seen for almost all of Season 6.
615 – The Biggest Douche in the Universe	In a movie where Rob Schneider is possessed by the soul of Kenny, he relives the same death as in "Weight Gain 4000", being shot and then impaled through the head on a flagpole.
715 – It's Christmas in Canada	He explodes upon being zapped with laser eyes by Saddam Hussein, who is posing as the Prime Minister of Canada.
807 – The Jeffersons	Mr. Jefferson throws Kenny (whom he believes is his son Blanket) into the ceiling of Blanket's room, killing him on impact.
903 – Wing	Kenny is shot dead by the Chinese mafia off-screen, and only his corpse is shown.
904 – Best Friends Forever	When Kenny is playing with his PSP, he is run over by a truck, whose driver is also playing with his PSP. He spends the majority of the episode's remainder hospitalized in a vegetative state; at the end of the episode, he dies peacefully after his feeding tube is removed.
1008 – Make Love, Not Warcraft	While Kenny himself does not physically die, his World of Warcraft character is killed twice. After his first death, Stan and Kyle say the usual lines.
1114 – The List	When Bebe Stevens wrestles with Wendy Testaburger over a gun, a bullet is fired in the struggle. Both of them find that neither of them have been shot. The stray bullet instead flies through the window of Kenny's house and through his head, while he is eating dinner with his family.
1301 – The Ring	Kenny dies of syphilis, which he contracts from performing fellatio on his girlfriend Tammy at the end of the episode.
1310 – W.T.F.	Kenny picks up a dud rocket-propelled grenade that was fired by ex-wrestling teacher Mr. Connors in an attempt to kill Vince McMahon. The grenade suddenly shoots upwards into the air, taking Kenny with it, and it explodes, killing him.
1314 – Pee	When the water park is flooded with urine, Kenny is left among the dead as his drowned body is spotted by Stan.
1401 – Sexual Healing	Kenny, in a Batman costume, hangs himself from his doorknob while performing autoerotic asphyxiation.
1412 and 1413 – Mysterion Rises and Coon vs. Coon & Friends	Kenny dies multiple times as his (talking) alter ego Mysterion. Resurrecting from death is revealed to be his superpower, always waking up the next morning in his bed as if nothing happened. He is first fatally stabbed by the leader of South Park's chapter of the Cult of Cthulhu. His next death comes when he shoots himself in the head with a handgun in front of his friends in a fruitless attempt to prove his superpowers to them. His third death comes when he and his friends are banished to R'lyeh by Cthulhu; he kills himself by leaping into a pit of spikes so he can regenerate in his bed, therefore escaping R'lyeh, so he can find a way to rescue the others. His final death comes at the end of the third episode of the trilogy, where he says he wants to go to sleep, and, again, shoots himself in the head in front of his friends. He is reborn afterwards and his parents put the newborn Kenny in his bed, as they have seemingly done many times before.
1514 – The Poor Kid	After once again becoming the poorest kid at his school, Kenny is picked up by a large reptilian bird (whom the agnostic Weatherhead couple foreshadow through their hypothesis that such a creature could potentially be God), who breaks through the school roof, thrashes him around, and eats him alive. This time, Stan simply says: "What the fuck?"
1606 – I Should Have Never Gone Ziplining	Kenny dies of boredom while riding on a boat going 5 miles per hour. Other factors that led up to his boredom include ziplining and horseback riding with tour groups. This death is seen in a live-action sequence and is the only death to do so.
1709 – Titties and Dragons	Dressed as Princess Kenny, he jumps out of the window at the Sony headquarters building in Japan in an attempt to fly. However, he crashes violently onto the pavement with blood splattering, horrifying pedestrians and the Sony employees. Princess Kenny is quickly revived by the power of cuteness and flies away.
2102 – Put It Down	Kenny is killed off-screen, as during the song at the end of the episode, a picture of him is among pictures of other students who have been "killed by a President on their phone" (run over).
2210 – Bike Parade	Kenny gets killed offscreen by Amazon Alexa at the orders of Jeff Bezos. Cartman is seen at the end of the episode hauling his casket during the bike parade.
2401 – The Pandemic Special	Kenny is shot in the street by a tank piloted by the South Park Police, for being outside during a citywide COVID-19 lockdown.
2901 – South American Biker Gangs	Kenny’s e-bike explodes while he rides it, implied to be a bomb planted by Randy. This is one of the few deaths that lasts longer than a single episode.
South Park: Bigger, Longer and Uncut	After watching the Terrance and Phillip movie, Cartman bets Kenny that he cannot light a fart on fire like Terrance does in the film. Kenny succeeds, but accidentally immolates himself in the process, and is then dumped with salt. In the hospital, the doctors botch his heart transplant by replacing the heart with a baked potato that one surgeon was microwaving earlier. He is given a prognosis of only 3 seconds to live, upon which his chest explodes, killing him.
South Park: Post COVID	Was said to have died of COVID-19 Delta Plus Rewards Program variant, after having traveled back in time in an attempt to stop the virus. His death serves as a major plotline for the movie. This death is undone during the events of South Park: Post COVID: The Return of COVID.
South Park: Joining the Panderverse	Although the main universe Kenny does not die in the film, his Panderverse counterpart is crushed to death when the Panderverse counterpart of Cartman falls back into her dimension and lands on top of her. The Panderverse counterparts of Stan and Kyle exclaim "Yo, bitch, you killed Kenny!" and "You fat hoe!", respectively.
South Park: The End of Obesity	Tony the Tiger pulls Kenny out of a truck and throws him against a car's windshield, killing him immediately.

== Character ==
=== Creation and design ===
Kenny's entire face was revealed for the first time in the 1999 film South Park: Bigger, Longer & Uncut.

When developing the character, the show's creators had observed that most groups of childhood friends in small middle-class towns always included "the one poor kid" and decided to portray Kenny in this light.

In a 2000 interview, Parker said that Kenny was based on a childhood friend of his who was also named Kenny and wore an orange parka that muffled his voice. He was the poorest child in the neighborhood and often skipped school, causing Parker and his friends to jokingly say he died, only for him to return to school later.

An unnamed precursor to Kenny first appeared in the first The Spirit of Christmas short, dubbed Jesus vs. Frosty, created by Parker and Stone in 1992 while they were students at the University of Colorado. The character was composed of construction paper cutouts and animated through the use of stop motion. (In this short, the Cartman precursor had the name "Kenny" and was subject to the "They killed Kenny!" gag.) When tasked three years later by friend Brian Graden to create another short as a video Christmas card that he could send to friends, Parker and Stone created another similarly-animated The Spirit of Christmas short, dubbed Jesus vs. Santa. In this short, Kenny is given his first name, and first appears as he does in the series. Kenny next appeared on August 13, 1997, when South Park debuted on Comedy Central with the episode "Cartman Gets an Anal Probe".

In tradition with the show's animation style, Kenny is composed of simple geometrical shapes and primary colors. He is not offered the same free range of motion associated with hand-drawn characters; his character is mostly shown from only one angle, and his movements are animated in an intentionally jerky fashion. Ever since the show's third episode, "Weight Gain 4000" (season one, 1997), Kenny, like all other characters on the show, has been animated with computer software, though he is portrayed to give the impression that the show still utilizes its original technique.

Mysterion unmasked at the end of "The Coon". Originally intended to have been a generic, unnamed classmate of the main characters, he was revealed to be Kenny in "Mysterion Rises".

The effect of Kenny's speech is achieved by Stone mumbling into his own hand as he provides Kenny's lines. While he originally voiced Kenny without any computer manipulation, Stone now does so by speaking in his normal vocal range and then adding a childlike inflection. The recorded audio is then edited with Pro Tools, and the pitch is altered to make the voice sound more like that of a 10 year old. As the technique of Kenny's muzzled enunciation frequently implies, many of his lines are indeed profane and sexually explicit, the lengthier of which are mostly improvised by Stone.

He first appeared unobscured by his hood in South Park: Bigger, Longer & Uncut, where it is revealed that he has messy blonde hair. Mike Judge provided the voice for Kenny's one line of uninsulated dialogue: "Goodbye, you guys." On a few occasions during episodes that have originally aired since the film's release, he has been seen without the parka; (Note: Including "The Tooth Fairy Tats 2000", "Super Best Friends", "Lil' Crime Stoppers", "The Jeffersons", "Good Times with Weapons", "The Losing Edge", "South Park Is Gay!", "Lice Capades", "Margaritaville", "W.T.F.", "Pee", "You're Getting Old", and "DikinBaus Hot Dogs".) however, unlike in Bigger, Longer & Uncut his entire face has been only seen four times in the television series without being partially obscured or otherwise altered, this being in "The Losing Edge", "The Jeffersons", "You're Getting Old", and "DikinBaus Hot Dogs" (except in the latter, his face is slightly concealed by a pair of sunglasses shades). He also speaks unmuffled during some of these instances, in which case co-producer Eric Stough provides Kenny's voice. During "The Coon" episodes of seasons 13 and 14, Kenny has his first major speaking role as the character Mysterion. Judge returns as unmuffled Kenny after 27 years to voice him again in "South American Biker Gangs".

=== Personality and traits ===
While most child characters on the show are foul-mouthed, Kenny is often even more risqué with his dialogue. Parker and Stone state that they depict Kenny and his friends in this manner in order to display how young boys really talk when they are alone. While Kenny is often cynical and profane, Parker notes that there nonetheless is an "underlying sweetness" aspect to the character, and Time magazine described Kenny and his friends as "sometimes cruel but with a core of innocence". He is amused by toilet humor and bodily functions, and his favorite television personalities are Terrance and Phillip, a Canadian duo whose comedy routines on their show-within-the-show revolve substantially around fart jokes. Kenny is shown to desire intercourse in the episode "The Ring", when he gets a girlfriend and is overjoyed to find out that she has a reputation as a slut. Kenny is also lecherous, and often portrayed as being eager to do and say disgusting things in an attempt to impress others or earn money. Conversely, his alter-ego Mysterion is seemingly mature, principled, and serious-minded, the only exception being one instance in "Mysterion Rises" in which he takes delight in irritating Cartman. As Mysterion, he convinces his parents to take better care of themselves and their children, as seen by their reaction when he questions them about the cult of Cthulhu. He also uses his disguise to protect his sister Karen (who refers to Mysterion as her "guardian angel"), as revealed in "The Poor Kid"; however, in all of his guises, Kenny is depicted as being uncommonly selfless, dying for the sake of others and spending all of his time working so he could buy his little sister a doll.

In the trilogy of episodes "Black Friday", "A Song of Ass and Fire" and "Titties and Dragons", in which the boys play-act characters from the TV series Game of Thrones, Kenny cross-dresses as a fantasy-style princess with a wig and dress similar to the video game character Princess Zelda, and becomes a Japanese-speaking moe anime character at one point. When Cartman complains, "You're never going to be a real princess", Princess Kenny responds (via her translator, Stan) angrily to Cartman, calling him a "ball-licking lesbian".

This portrayal continues in the video game South Park: The Stick of Truth where Cartman notes that playing a "chick" is "just how [Kenny] seems to be rolling right now". Kenny's sister also refers to Kenny as a girl, if talked to in the McCormick house. Throughout the game, Kenny posts 'status updates' referring to herself as "the cutest of them all".

== In other media ==
Kenny had a major role in South Park: Bigger, Longer & Uncut, the full-length film based on the series, and appeared on the film's soundtrack singing (albeit muffled) several lines of the song "Mountain Town" from the film. As a tribute to the Dead Parrot sketch, a short that features Kenny as a "dead friend" being returned by Cartman to a shop run by Kyle aired during a 1999 BBC television special commemorating the 30th anniversary of Monty Python's Flying Circus. Kenny was also featured in the documentary film The Aristocrats, listening to Cartman tell his version of the film's titular joke, and in "The Gauntlet", a short spoofing both Gladiator and Battlefield Earth that aired during the 2000 MTV Movie Awards.

Kenny also appears in six South Park-related video games: In South Park, Kenny is controlled by the player through the first-person shooter mode who attempts to ward off enemies from terrorizing the town of South Park. In South Park: Chef's Luv Shack, a user has the option of playing as Kenny when participating in the game's several "minigames" based on other popular arcade games. In the racing game South Park Rally, a user can race as Kenny against other users playing as other characters, while choosing to place him in any of a variety of vehicles. In South Park Let's Go Tower Defense Play!, Kenny can be selected as a playable character used to establish a tower defense against the game's antagonists. In South Park: The Stick of Truth, Kenny (as Princess Kenny) can be selected as a companion over the course of much of the game. In South Park: The Fractured but Whole, Kenny is seen as his alter-ego Mysterion.

== Cultural impact ==
Kenny's deaths are well-known in popular culture, and was one of the things viewers most commonly associated with South Park during its earlier seasons. IGN ranked Kenny at #6 on their "The Top 25 South Park Characters" list. The exclamation of "Oh my God! They killed Kenny!" quickly became a popular catchphrase, while both Kenny and the phrase have appeared on some of the more popular pieces of South Park merchandise, including shirts, bumper stickers, calendars and baseball caps, and inspired the rap song "Kenny's Dead" by Master P, which was featured on Chef Aid: The South Park Album.

The running gag of Kenny's deaths in earlier seasons was incorporated into the season 9 (2005) episode "Best Friends Forever" when Kenny, in a vegetative state, is kept alive by a feeding tube while a media circus erupted over whether the tube should be removed and allow Kenny to die. The episode received much attention as it served to provide commentary on the Terri Schiavo case, originally airing just one day before Schiavo died. The episode earned South Park its first Emmy Award for Outstanding Animated Program.

Kenny's deaths have been subject to much critical analysis in the media and literary world. In the book South Park and Philosophy: Bigger, Longer, and More Penetrating, an essay by Southern Illinois University philosophy professor Randall Auxier, entitled "Killing Kenny: Our Daily Dose of Death", suggests that the fashion of the recurring gag serves to help the viewer become more comfortable with the inevitability of their own death. In the book South Park and Philosophy: You Know, I Learned Something Today, University of Wisconsin–Stevens Point professor Karin Fry wrote an essay concerning the parallels between Kenny's role in the show and the different concepts of existentialism.

When Sophie Rutschmann of the University of Strasbourg discovered a mutated gene that causes an adult fruit fly to die within two days after it is infected with certain bacteria, she named the gene "Kenny" in honor of the character.
