= How to Eat with Your Butt =

- South Park episode
- Episode no.: Season 5 Episode 10
- Directed by: Trey Parker
- Written by: Trey Parker
- Production code: 510
- Original air date: November 14, 2001

Episode chronology
← Previous "Osama bin Laden Has Farty Pants"	Next → "The Entity"
- South Park season 5

"How to Eat with Your Butt" is the tenth episode of the fifth season of the animated television series South Park, and the 75th episode of the series overall. "How to Eat with Your Butt" originally aired in the United States on November 14, 2001, on Comedy Central. In the episode, Cartman puts a picture of Kenny's butt on a milk carton as a prank, but loses his ability to laugh when a couple arrives in South Park with buttocks instead of faces.

== Plot ==
It is picture day at South Park Elementary, and as a prank, Kenny wears his parka upside down and stands on his head with his legs through the sleeves so that his buttocks show through his hood, which makes Cartman laugh uncontrollably. Four days later, the photos arrive. When Ms. Choksondik says that one unfortunate boy spoiled his photo and will not get it back, Kenny thinks she is referring to him for his buttock prank, until it is revealed momentarily that she is referring to Butters, even though Butters looked normal in his photo and winds up getting sent to the principal's office for his misconduct. His parents, irrationally convinced that Butters' normal face is some sort of silly face, promptly ground him and force him to wear a brown paper bag over his head for making "silly faces" and apparently think that his normal face has his mom's makeup. It is (what his parents and teacher do not notice) a piece of his hair sticking up after he combed his hair to look perfect and him blinking which ruined his school photo.

To compound this prank, Cartman then submits Kenny's photo to a milk company, which places it on the milk cartons. Cartman's description of him includes features with obvious double meanings, such as a "winking brown eye", "blonde hair", and "rosy cheeks". The photo draws a response from a couple in Wisconsin, Martha and Stephen Thompson, who lost their son some years earlier, and shockingly have buttocks in place of their faces. They later explain that they suffer from a congenital condition known as "torsonic polarity syndrome" or "TPS" which has them born with their faces appearing as the human buttocks. With the syndrome, however, they still retain all normal functionality of their faces (including noses, eyes, etc.) under the buttocks. When the Thompsons appear looking at Cartman's house for Kenny, he is stunned and can no longer laugh, believing that he has seen something so incredibly funny, that nothing else will ever be able to make him laugh again. From that point on, Cartman refers to this as "blowing his funny fuse".

Meanwhile, Cartman does whatever he can to try to make himself laugh. He goes through a list of things like seeing a raunchy movie, and talking to Jimmy for his stand-up routines. When all else fails, Cartman is shown in his room holding a pistol. He writes a letter to his mother, explaining that he cannot face his friends without a sense of humor, places the gun in his mouth, and takes a bite, revealing that the gun is made of chocolate. He then asks his mother to buy him more chocolate guns (with marshmallow filling, as he does not like peanut butter).

At the end of the episode, the South Park milk company officially announces that the missing son of the Thompsons is none other than Ben Affleck. When Cartman finds out, he calls the Thompsons' son "Ben Ass-fleck" and this immediately causes him to start laughing again. Stan and Kyle conclude that he could not laugh before because he felt guilty for making the Thompsons believe that their son had been found – which Cartman vehemently denies. When Cartman invites Kenny over to eat some chocolate guns straight after, Kenny is suddenly run over and killed by a motorcyclist, which Cartman finds very funny.

== Production ==
This is the first episode where Kyle's hair is shown. The plot of the episode comes from cartoons that Parker drew in high school of two people with butts on their face.

== Home media ==
"How to Eat with Your Butt," along with the thirteen other episodes from South Park: the Complete Fifth Season, was released on a three-disc DVD set in the United States on February 22, 2005. The set includes brief audio commentaries by Parker and Stone for each episode.
