= Toby Morton =

American comedy writer and political activist

- Born: Toby Morton; April 7, 1971 (age 55)
- Occupations: Comedy writer; voice actor; political activist; parody web site developer
- Years active: 2001–present
- Known for: Voice of Scott Tenorman on South Park; creator of political parody/anti-fascist websites

Toby Morton is an American comedy writer, voice actor, and political activist. He worked as a staff writer and occasional voice actor on the animated series South Park in the early 2000s, where he is best known for voicing the recurring character Scott Tenorman. In the mid-2020s, Morton became known for a satirical activism project in which he purchases web domain names associated with politicians, primarily Republicans, and turns them into parody websites criticizing his targets.

== Early career ==
Morton began his career in television comedy as a writer's assistant before moving into voice work and, eventually, script writing. He voiced the title antagonist in the 2001 South Park episode "Scott Tenorman Must Die", one of the series' best-known episodes, and also voiced other minor characters on the show, including Mr. Frank Fun in "Cartmanland" and a version of Ike Broflovski in "Super Best Friends".

Morton continued to consult for South Park after his main writing tenure, including work on the 2005 episode "Best Friends Forever", which won the show its first Primetime Emmy Award. He later joined the writing staff of MADtv, where he created a recurring animated segment entitled "Weekly Kid News with Toby". Morton also wrote for Trey Parker and Matt Stone's sitcom That's My Bush!, for E!, and spent two years writing in the United Kingdom, including work for the BBC.

Beginning in 2013, Morton has served in various roles at the Blue Whale Comedy Festival in Tulsa, Oklahoma, including as a curator and emcee of its short-film program.

== Political activism ==
In the 2020s, Morton became known for buying inexpensive web domain names connected to sitting politicians and political organizations, mostly Republicans, and converting them into satirical parody websites. By late 2025, reporting described Morton as operating roughly fifty such political parody sites, most bought for between $15 and $30.

Targets of Morton's domain-buying campaigns have included Texas Attorney General Ken Paxton, Texas Governor Greg Abbott, the advocacy group Moms for Liberty, the conservative policy blueprint Project 2025, Representative Marjorie Taylor Greene, Representative Nancy Mace, Representative Elise Stefanik, and Senate Minority Leader Chuck Schumer, among others.

In August 2025, months before it was publicly confirmed, Morton anticipated that Donald Trump's allies would add Trump's name to the John F. Kennedy Center for the Performing Arts and he purchased the domain names trumpkennedycenter.org and trumpkennedycenter.com. When the center's Trump-appointed board announced the renaming in December 2025, Morton's earlier purchase drew national media attention, and he began developing satirical content for the sites, examining what he described as the repackaging of institutions as personal political branding.

Morton has described his political outlook as independent of either major party, stating that he does not trust politicians as a class and that no party holds a monopoly on truth. He also writes a Substack newsletter and describes himself, in part tongue-in-cheek, as the founder of what he calls the "First Church of Petty Digital Revenge."

== Reception ==
Coverage of Morton's parody-site campaign has appeared in outlets including The Hollywood Reporter, Variety, Deadline, The Washington Post, and the Dallas Observer. His targets and their allies have at times responded critically; Representative Elise Stefanik has publicly referred to Morton in dismissive terms. Some of Morton's parody sites have drawn legal threats from representatives of the institutions and individuals the sites target, which Morton has publicly rebuffed by asserting that his sites are protected political satire and parody.

== See also ==
- South Park
- Political satire
