= Proper Condom Use =

- South Park episode
- Episode no.: Season 5 Episode 7
- Directed by: Trey Parker
- Written by: Trey Parker
- Production code: 507
- Original air date: August 1, 2001

Episode chronology
← Previous "Cartmanland"	Next → "Towelie"
- South Park season 5

"Proper Condom Use" is the seventh episode of the fifth season of the animated television series South Park, and the 72nd episode of the series overall. "Proper Condom Use" originally aired in the United States on August 1, 2001 on Comedy Central.

In the episode, the fourth graders at South Park Elementary begin sexual education classes. However, the teachers do it in an improper way, leading the boys to wage war against the girls.

== Plot ==
Eric Cartman and Kenny McCormick learn from the 5th graders that "milking" a dog is possible, when it is in fact just stimulating the dog to the point of ejaculation which they call "red rocket" and "beating off" the dog. They show the act to Stan Marsh and Kyle Broflovski, who are impressed. Stan performs the technique on his own dog Sparky in front of his parents and their friends during a book club meeting, for which he is grounded for ten months. Stan does not understand why he is being punished, as his parents are too embarrassed to explain sexual stimulation to him and decide that the school should be responsible for teaching sex education.

Mr. Mackey tries to teach the fourth grade boys about male and female anatomy and the mechanics of sexual intercourse, but, not having had sex since he was 19, cannot teach the boys anything of use. Ms. Choksondik, angered off sex after a boyfriend dumped her after a sexual encounter ended poorly, intends to scare the girls into safe sex by spending her lesson teaching the girls about all the different types of sexually transmitted diseases (STDs) that they might catch if the boys are not wearing condoms, but does not mention that, to catch these diseases, they would first need to have sex. The boys try talking to Chef, who actually has had much sexual experience, but he (who was opposed to the sex ed class and wanted the children to keep their naivety) does not tell them anything. The girls become so terrified of the boys that, upon being approached by them at lunch, they back away and scream in fright when they learn the boys are not wearing condoms. Afraid they will spread a disease, the boys go to the pharmacy to purchase condoms.

Hearing from the pharmacist that condoms were purchased, the school believes this is due to the students being sexually active. As a result, Ms. Choksondik says they should start teaching kindergarten students about sex education and Mr. Garrison spearheads those lessons in an overtly erotic way, much to Chef's outrage.

Ms. Choksondik teaches the girls about pregnancy, which scares them even more than before when she shows them a detailed video of childbirth. The boys then buy the condoms and wear them at all times, not understanding how they work. Mr. Mackey tells them they are only worn during sexual intercourse. Angry that the girls misled them and thinking that the girls are the ones carrying diseases, they come to believe that they must get rid of the girls. The girls build a massive fort to keep the boys out. The boys tell them to leave town in a siege reminiscent of Mad Max 2, but the girls refuse and attack the boys (killing Kenny with a boomerang), which escalates into a battle.

While preparing the lesson plan, Ms. Choksondik and Mr. Mackey become aroused by the sexual nature of their conversation, and admit to having sexual fantasies about each other. The two undress, and engage in unprotected sexual intercourse.

Meanwhile, the battle draws the attention of the adults and the parents, who get angry at the children for the conflict. Ms. Choksondik apologizes to the girls for not telling them that an STD is transmitted through sexual intercourse, believing it had been implied when she first told them. Chef, however, states that the parents are to blame since they were so quick to let the schools handle sex education and leaving it in the hands of either someone with little experience (Mr. Mackey), someone with a negative view (Ms. Choksondik), or "a complete pervert" (Mr. Garrison, who is offended at being singled out) rather than teach it to their kids themselves. The episode ends with Cartman stimulating another dog as everyone looks on without any objection.

Over the closing credits, Garrison can be heard still teaching kindergarteners different sexual positions.

== Ratings and censorship ==
In Australia, the episode received an MA rating, due to strong sexual content throughout, and graphic violence near the end of the episode. Because of its content, this episode also aired at 9:00 at night instead of the program's usual 8:30 timeslot. The British satellite channel Sky One banned the episode for its strong sexual and violent content, even though it aired a TV trailer with scenes from the episode. The UK terrestrial channel Channel 4 and the UK cable channels Paramount Comedy 1, MTV UK and VIVA aired the episode with no edits made.

According to the DVD commentary, Comedy Central asked Parker and Stone to drastically shorten the part where Garrison demonstrates how to put on a condom by using his mouth with a condom around the lips and deep-throating the model penis used in the lesson. They retained the scene for when the show originally aired, but repeat episodes cut from the moment Garrison is putting his lips on the dildo to the children staring in shock at what Garrison is doing off-screen. The DVD release uses the edited version.

== Continuity ==
In the episode, Mr. Mackey states he has not had sex in "about 21 years" despite the fact that in the episode "Ike's Wee Wee" Mackey got briefly married and went on a honeymoon in India. Similarly, Mackey tells Choksondik that, while growing up, his head "just sorta seemed to get bigger while the rest of [his] body stayed the same," contradicting the explanation for Mackey's large head provided in "Ike's Wee Wee," in which Mackey's head shrunk back to a regular size when he removed his tie.

== Home media ==
"Proper Condom Use," along with the thirteen other episodes from South Park: the Complete Fifth Season, was released on a three-disc DVD set in the United States on February 22, 2005. The sets include brief audio commentaries by Parker and Stone for each episode.

"Proper Condom Use" was released on DVD in June 2002, along with the episodes "Cripple Fight," "Scott Tenorman Must Die" and "It Hits the Fan," on a video titled Insults to Injuries.
