= Osama bin Laden Has Farty Pants =

- South Park episode
- Episode no.: Season 5 Episode 9
- Directed by: Trey Parker
- Written by: Trey Parker
- Production code: 509
- Original air date: November 7, 2001

Episode chronology
← Previous "Towelie"	Next → "How to Eat with Your Butt"
- South Park season 5

"Osama bin Laden Has Farty Pants" is the ninth episode in the fifth season of the American animated television series South Park. The 74th episode of the series overall, it was the first South Park episode to premiere after the September 11 attacks, having originally aired on Comedy Central in the United States on November 7, 2001. The story deals primarily with the aftermath of the attacks and the American invasion of Afghanistan, as the boys come to face Osama bin Laden when they are mistakenly shipped to Afghanistan.

== Plot ==
The four boys wait at the bus-stop wearing gas masks for defence from anthrax. Since the September 11 attacks, everything has changed in South Park: everyone is afraid of terrorists, American flags are plastered everywhere to show widespread patriotism and Stan's mother has become catatonic and lies on the couch all day watching the news. Upon arriving at school, the boys discover that they must, in response to President Bush's request for charity to Afghanistan, donate a dollar. The boys' dollars are sent to four Afghan kids who closely resemble them. Though their town is in ruins after excessive American bombing and the unconverted American money is unusable in Afghanistan, in return the four Afghan boys send the South Park boys a goat in the mail. The boys realize that their parents will not let them keep the goat and so they try to send it back to Afghanistan. Since only U.S. military planes are flying over the country, they can only do it by sneaking the goat aboard a military plane. They sneak into a nearby base, able to do so when the guards mistake the goat for Stevie Nicks there for a USO show; however, the boys wind up on the plane too, and are sent to Afghanistan.

The boys manage to find their Afghan counterparts, who refuse to take back the goat; furthermore, the two groups get into an argument over America. The South Park boys assumed that most Afghans liked America, but the Afghan boys reveal that they hate the country, viewing America as an evil empire plotting world domination. This angers the boys, as they cannot return the goat this way. After the boys leave to try to get home, they get caught by terrorists and are brought to the hiding place of Osama bin Laden, who is depicted as completely insane. He communicates by repeating the same few words over and over including "Durka", "Burka", "Jihad" and "Allah". Bin Laden makes a video tape revealing his hostages and again the U.S. Army mistakes the goat for Stevie Nicks and declares they must rescue her. The Afghan boys, finding out about this, go and rescue the American boys despite their argument, stating that if they do not help the innocent they are no better than America. Cartman, however, proclaims he will "take care" of bin Laden. The U.S. Army storms the cave to rescue "Stevie Nicks". Amidst the firefight, Kenny and his Afghan counterpart are strafed by a U.S. helicopter, and after the reaction the boys wind up getting in yet another fight.

A comic battle ensues between Cartman and bin Laden, strongly resembling World War II-era animation, when anti-Nazi/anti-Japanese themes appeared across Warner Bros. and Disney propaganda films. Cartman ultimately tricks bin Laden into donning an Uncle Sam costume and hands him a lit stick of dynamite as a microphone. Terrorists see bin Laden in his costume and shoot him up before the dynamite explodes. The subdued and dazed bin Laden is killed by an American soldier and the commander of the American forces proclaim the war is won. With the Taliban overthrown and bin Laden dead, the boys say goodbye to the Afghan kids who still hate them. Stan replies with "maybe... someday... we can learn to hate you too." The Afghan kids reply positively, confusing Kyle. The troops celebrate their victory with a show by Fleetwood Mac. Before they leave, Stan sticks a small American flag into the ground, confusing Kyle, who thought the Afghan kids had talked Stan into not liking America. Stan replies, "No, dude. America may have some problems, but it's our home, our team. If you don't want to root for your team, then you should get the hell out of the stadium." The episode ends with Stan and Kyle saluting the American flag, saying "Go America" and finishing with "Go Broncos."

== Production ==
According to the creators in the DVD commentary, much of the inspiration for the episode came from fear there would be a second attack. The depiction of Bin Laden was based on old Looney Tunes cartoons from World War II. Also in the commentary, Matt Stone stated that he hates Stevie Nicks.

In 2011, Comedy Central re-aired the episode, along with "It's a Jersey Thing", after the killing of Osama bin Laden.

== Reception ==
The episode was nominated for a 2002 Emmy for Outstanding Animated Program, but lost to Futurama's "Roswell That Ends Well".

IGN rated the episode a 9/10, stating "There are a number of terrific jokes that manage to perfectly capture the mood and climate at the time," and praising the episode for its Looney Tunes parody between Cartman and Osama bin Laden. They conclude that the episode is an example of "an accurate and thoughtful appraisal of the national mood and the international realities, as well as a bit of patriotic chest thumping in the aftermath of a crisis," and state that it is why South Park stands out in television.

== Home media ==
"Osama bin Laden Has Farty Pants," along with the thirteen other episodes from South Park: the Complete Fifth Season, was released on a three-disc DVD set in the United States on February 22, 2005. The set includes brief audio commentaries by Parker and Stone for each episode.
