= Here Comes the Neighborhood =

- South Park episode
- Episode no.: Season 5 Episode 12
- Directed by: Eric Stough
- Written by: Trey Parker
- Production code: 512
- Original air date: November 28, 2001

Episode chronology
← Previous "The Entity"	Next → "Kenny Dies"
- South Park season 5

"Here Comes the Neighborhood" is the twelfth episode of the fifth season of the animated television series South Park, and the 77th episode of the series overall. "Here Comes the Neighborhood" originally aired in the United States on November 28, 2001, on Comedy Central. The title is a play on the expression "There goes the neighborhood."

In the episode, a class war ensues in South Park when it becomes a hot spot for rich celebrities, all of whom are African-American. Meanwhile, Token feels rejected by his friends and goes to live with lions.

== Plot ==
The children at South Park Elementary are presenting science projects. Token gets a "check plus" for presenting a computer model of predicted weather conditions, while Cartman is angry for receiving a "check minus" on his hastily constructed project and points out to the class Token's wealth in his rage, notably his clothes. Token happens to be the richest kid in town, and becomes upset when he can find no other kids in the school he can relate to. He tries to get himself and his family to act poor. They shop at J-Mart, where the rest of the families buy their clothes, but when he comes to Stan's house with the other boys and brings a DVD of The Lion King instead of a video tape–Token's family being the only people in town with a DVD player–the boys realize that he has not changed.

Despondent at his social estrangement, Token decides to arrange for dozens of rich people (who all happen to be black) such as Will Smith and Snoop Dogg to move into South Park, which leads to Mr. Garrison complaining about the "richers" in the town, which in turn leads to ire among the other, less affluent members of the community (who all happen to be white). However, Token discovers that the rich kids (who are even richer than him) are as different from him as he is from the poorer kids in town. All the rich kids play polo, buy stuff at shops and speak with exaggerated English accents. Token feels so much like an outcast that he goes to live with lions in the South Park Zoo after the rich kids taunt him to do it, where Aslan is the leader of the pack.

The situation between the rich and poor residents of town continues as the gentrification escalates. Led by Mr. Garrison, the townsfolk enact a series of measures. They decide to plant a lower case "t" cross for "time to leave" in the garden of some of the rich residents, setting it on fire to emphasize their point. They mock the rich residents by insisting they sit at the front of buses claiming it to be the "first class" section. They refuse to let them drink in the bars or eat in the restaurants. In response, the rich residents organise a Million Millionaire March, paying poor black residents such as Chef to attend.

Token eventually decides he does not want to live with lions anymore (because they only play practical jokes) and leaves the lair. However, he finds the boys (in the middle of using a sled to carry Kenny's corpse, whose death in this episode goes unexplained) and discovers that the poor kids in town who made fun of him being rich didn't dislike him. They tell him that they only picked on him because they all pick on each other on a regular basis. They decide to stop ripping on him for his money, and instead mock him for his reaction to the previous insults as being a "pussy".

Eventually, the townsfolk dress as "ghosts" (resembling Ku Klux Klan robes), resulting in the rich people responding with terror and fleeing the town. The poor townsfolk gather around their abandoned houses. Mr. Garrison suggests that by selling the empty houses the townsfolk can become rich. Jimbo and Randy tell him that if they do they will become the very thing they hate. Garrison shrugs, "Well, yeah, but at least I got rid of all those damn ni-", but he is unable to say the last word because the closing credits cut him off.

== Production ==
On the commentary, Trey Parker and Matt Stone describe the episode as depicting a world where racism does not exist, but the last word spoils it in saying something that is fully racist. They wanted to begin the next episode with Garrison saying "ggers."

== Home media ==
"Here Comes the Neighborhood," along with the thirteen other episodes from South Park: the Complete Fifth Season, was released on a three-disc DVD set in the United States on February 22, 2005. The set includes brief audio commentaries by Parker and Stone for each episode.

== See also ==
- Red Man's Greed a similar premise from the seventh season involving Native Americans.
