= South Park season 5 =

2001 television series season

South Park
- Season 5
- Home media release cover
- No. of episodes: 14

Release
- Original network: Comedy Central
- Original release: June 20 – December 12, 2001

Season chronology
- ← Previous; Season 4 Next → Season 6

The fifth season of South Park, an American animated television series created by Trey Parker and Matt Stone, began airing on June 20, 2001. The season concluded after 14 episodes on December 12, 2001. The 14-episode season length would become a standard for later years of the series, starting from the eighth season up until the sixteenth season.

== Production ==
In 2007, Parker called the season "the one where shit starts getting good", while Stone called it "the best one."

The penultimate episode of the season, "Kenny Dies", sees Kenny's "permanent" death from a terminal disease. Up until this episode, Kenny would be killed in (almost) every episode as a running gag. According to Stone and Parker, they were running out of ideas for creative ways to kill Kenny and in general had grown tired of his character, not seeing a point to keep him around.

Season 6 focused on the other boys coping with Kenny's death and trying to find a replacement (first Butters, then Tweek). Due to outcry from fans, he was eventually written back into the series at the end of the season 6 finale.

== Voice cast ==
=== Main cast ===
- Trey Parker as Stan Marsh, Eric Cartman, Randy Marsh, Mr. Garrison, Clyde Donovan, Mr. Hankey, Mr. Mackey, Stephen Stotch, Jimmy Valmer, Timmy Burch and Phillip
- Matt Stone as Kyle Broflovski, Kenny McCormick, Butters Stotch, Gerald Broflovski, Stuart McCormick, Craig Tucker, Tweek Tweak, Jimbo Kern, Terrance, Jesus, and Pip Pirrup
- Eliza Schneider as Liane Cartman, Sheila Broflovski, Shelly Marsh, Sharon Marsh, Mayor McDaniels, Carol McCormick, Wendy Testaburger, Principal Victoria and Ms. Crabtree
- Mona Marshall as Sheila Broflovski and Linda Stotch
- Isaac Hayes as Chef

=== Guest cast ===
- Thom Yorke, Jonny Greenwood, Colin Greenwood, Ed O'Brien, and Philip Selway as themselves ("Scott Tenorman Must Die")

== Episodes ==
No. overall	No. in season	Title	Directed by	Written by	Original release date	Prod. code	U.S. viewers (millions)
66	1	"It Hits the Fan"	Trey Parker	Trey Parker	June 20, 2001	502	3.03 2.10 (Note: The episode was viewed in 2.30 million households in terms of cable household coverage ratings.) (HH)
When a crime drama on TV airs an episode using the curse word shit uncensored, the town popularizes the word, which causes people to die from the plague and the boys, with assistance from Chef, attempts to break the chanting chatter of the word.
67	2	"Cripple Fight"	Trey Parker	Trey Parker	June 27, 2001	503	2.74 1.78 (Note: The episode was viewed in 1.82 million households in terms of cable household coverage ratings.) (HH)
Big Gay Al takes over as the boys' new troop leader; a new kid with disabilities starts to irritate Timmy. • First appearance of Jimmy Valmer.
68	3	"Super Best Friends"	Trey Parker	Trey Parker	July 4, 2001	504	1.66
A David Blaine cult comes to South Park, but soon has brainwashed the boys, except for Stan, leading him to get the "Super Best Friends" into saving the world and into trying to destroy Blaine.
69	4	"Scott Tenorman Must Die"	Eric Stough	Trey Parker	July 11, 2001	501	2.81 1.88 (HH)
When Cartman is conned by Scott Tenorman, who convinced Cartman that buying pubic hair will make him reach puberty, he bursts out his anger into getting his revenge on Scott as soon as possible.
70	5	"Terrance and Phillip: Behind the Blow"	Trey Parker	Trey Parker	July 18, 2001	505	2.77
The boys try to reunite Terrance and Phillip, who are feuding, so they can perform at an Earth Day assembly.
71	6	"Cartmanland"	Trey Parker	Trey Parker	July 25, 2001	506	3.09
Kyle develops a hemorrhoid, and begins to lose his faith in God when Cartman inherits $1 million which he uses to buy his own amusement park.
72	7	"Proper Condom Use"	Trey Parker	Trey Parker	August 1, 2001	507	2.45
The school is forced to teach sex education to the students at a younger age after the boys are found giving dogs handjobs, leading to a gender war because of incompetent teaching methods.
73	8	"Towelie"	Trey Parker	Trey Parker	August 8, 2001	508	2.68
In order to get their video game console back, the boys must bring a drug-smoking towel to the government from the feud between paramilitaries and extraterrestrials.
74	9	"Osama bin Laden Has Farty Pants"	Trey Parker	Trey Parker	November 7, 2001	509	2.23
The boys go to Afghanistan to return a goat given as a gift, where Stan and Kyle fight with Afghan kids over America's reputation and Cartman becomes the Bugs Bunny to Osama bin Laden's Elmer Fudd during the aftermath of the attacks and the War in Afghanistan.
75	10	"How to Eat with Your Butt"	Trey Parker	Trey Parker	November 14, 2001	510	3.16
Cartman "blows a funny fuse" when his prank of putting Kenny's butt on a milk carton prompts a family with butts for faces to come to South Park in search of their long lost son. Meanwhile, Butters gets grounded for his supposedly bad school photo.
76	11	"The Entity"	Trey Parker	Trey Parker	November 21, 2001	511	2.30
Kyle's cousin, a stereotypical nebbishy Jewish boy also named Kyle, comes to stay with him for weeks. Meanwhile, Mr. Garrison's anger towards airline service after the September 11th attacks prompts him to create a new version for transportation.
77	12	"Here Comes the Neighborhood"	Eric Stough	Trey Parker	November 28, 2001	512	3.03
Tired of being teased for being rich due to Cartman's racism, Token attracts wealthier black families to South Park.
78	13	"Kenny Dies"	Trey Parker	Trey Parker	December 5, 2001	513	2.66
Kenny contracts a severe muscular disease and he is placed in a hospital, where he spends his final moments with his best friends before he dies "permanently". Meanwhile, Cartman is selling aborted fetuses from a crashed truck.
79	14	"Butters' Very Own Episode"	Eric Stough	Trey Parker	December 12, 2001	514	2.63
When Butters survives a murder attempt by his mother after discovering a shocking secret about his father, he must travel back to South Park in time for his parents' wedding anniversary at Bennigan's. Meanwhile, Butters' parents join Gary Condit, O. J. Simpson, and the Ramseys in lying to the press about who murdered Butters.

== See also ==
- South Park (Park County, Colorado)
- South Park City
