= Mr. Garrison =

South Park character

- South Park character
- First appearance: "Cartman Gets an Anal Probe" (1997)
- Created by: Trey Parker; Matt Stone
- Designed by: Trey Parker; Matt Stone
- Voiced by: Trey Parker

In-universe information
- Full name: Herbert Garrison
- Aliases: Janet Garrison; Ethan P. Garrison; Mr. Hammerhead; Javier Blanco; The President
- Gender: Male (seasons 1–8; 12–present); Trans female (seasons 9–12)
- Title(s): Mr. (seasons 1–8, 12–19, 24–present); Mrs. (seasons 9–12); President (seasons 20–24)
- Occupation: School teacher (seasons 1–19, 25–present); President of the United States (seasons 20–24)
- Family: Mr. Garrison Senior (father); Mrs. Garrison Senior (mother)
- Significant others: Mr. Slave (ex-boyfriend); Richard Dawkins (ex-boyfriend); Allison (ex-girlfriend); Rick (current boyfriend)
- Home: Arkansas, United States; South Park, Colorado, United States; The White House, Washington, D.C.

Mr. Herbert Garrison is a fictional character and occasional antagonist featured in the American animated television series South Park, created by Matt Stone and Trey Parker (who also voices the character). Garrison first appeared in South Park's pilot episode, "Cartman Gets an Anal Probe", which aired on August 13, 1997.

Garrison is primarily employed as a teacher at South Park Elementary, originally of the main characters' third grade class, and currently, their fourth-grade class. In the earlier seasons, Garrison uses a hand puppet named Mr. Hat as a teaching resource; the puppet occasionally shows signs of sentience and has been suggested to be a manifestation of Garrison's own latent homosexual feelings. Mr. Hat was largely retired by the sixth season. Garrison was partially inspired by Parker's kindergarten teacher, who also used a puppet named Mr. Hat, as well as a British literature professor Parker had at the University of Colorado. Garrison is characterized as particularly cynical, especially in comparison with the other adults in South Park, and he is one of the few characters on South Park to have broken the fourth wall.

In the ninth season premiere, "Mr. Garrison's Fancy New Vagina", Garrison comes out as a trans woman, undergoes a sex change operation and renames herself Janet Garrison. In the twelfth season episode "Eek, a Penis!" a disillusioned Garrison undergoes another sex change operation to detransition. During the twentieth season, Garrison is elected as the 45th president of the United States, being a parody of Donald Trump's first term, and serves in the role until the twenty-fourth season. He is never referred to by name during this period, and is exclusively referred to as "the President". For Trump's second term starting in the twenty-seventh season, rather than using Garrison as a Trump parody again, Donald Trump himself is depicted taking reference from an earlier depiction of Saddam Hussein.

Parker has stated that Garrison has become one of the most complex characters on South Park, particularly due to his relationship with Mr. Hat and his sexuality and gender issues. He describes Garrison as "the soap opera element to the whole series. [He] has a real story going on."

== Role in South Park ==
In South Park, Garrison was raised in Arkansas and claims to have a master's degree in mechanical engineering from Denver Community College, as depicted in "The Entity". Garrison is characterized as being sexually confused, having had both heterosexual and same-sex relationships in addition to two sex reassignment surgeries.

In many episodes, Garrison displays racist tendencies. In the episode "Chef Goes Nanners", Garrison's hand puppet, Mr. Hat, is a member of the local chapter of the Ku Klux Klan, which Garrison resents, and he insists to Chef that he wants nothing to do with it. However, in the later episode "Here Comes the Neighborhood", he leads an effort to run affluent residents–who are all Black–out of town using Klan techniques, including burning crosses. Although the townsfolk at first claim that this is because of the "richers'" wealth, in his last line of the episode, Garrison's intentions are revealed to be indeed racially motivated. In the episode "An Elephant Makes Love to a Pig", he states that "genetic engineering erases all of God's mistakes, like German people". In multiple episodes, he expresses disdain for Mexican people, to the point of attempting to prolong the COVID-19 pandemic in order to keep his campaign promise to eradicate Mexicans, even if countless other people also died.

In the first three seasons, Garrison teaches the third–grade class at South Park Elementary School. He was portrayed as a closeted homosexual, of which he was ashamed. He pretends to have highly negative views on homosexuality in earlier episodes. Garrison usually uses a hand puppet named Mr. Hat, which he uses to emote more aggressively as well as to display his internal conflicts. It was suggested that Mr. Hat, and his temporary replacement Mr. Twig, were characters through which Garrison could express his repressed gay feelings. Though Garrison emphatically denies being gay, he acknowledges that Mr. Hat and Mr. Twig had homosexual fantasies. He eventually comes out as gay in the episode "4th Grade".

It has been established that Garrison has had heterosexual relationships, including with Liane Cartman. Possible same-sex relationships include one with Stephen Stotch in "Butters' Very Own Episode", and Garrison sought a tryst with Eric Cartman in "Cartman Joins NAMBLA", in which Garrison solicited sex from Cartman, not knowing that he had contacted the latter online; Garrison was consequently arrested for this act and then temporarily dismissed from his teaching position. In his absence from teaching, Garrison wrote an erotic romance novel titled In the Valley of Penises, which sold respectably before it won the Gay Pulitzer Prize and was deemed to be "the best work of homoerotic literature since Huckleberry Finn".

In the episodes following the release of his novel, Garrison has a nervous breakdown and flees South Park to become a hermit, where he eventually comes to terms with his gay identity. After this point, he is portrayed as openly embracing his homosexuality.

He is rehired by South Park Elementary as a kindergarten teacher, as his previous position as the fourth grade teacher was held by Diane Choksondik. In the sixth season episode "The Death Camp of Tolerance", he was promoted to the fourth grade following Choksondik's death. However, when Garrison finds that he could sue the school for substantial compensation if he were discriminated against, he purposely attempts to be dismissed. To that end, he abandons his puppet counterpart in favor of a human assistant, Mr. Slave, Garrison's personal BDSM slave and lover. The two proceed to perform several sexually explicit homosexual acts in front of Garrison's students. Garrison's plan was unsuccessful, and he was instead praised for his perceived bravery.

The show has implied that Garrison has corprophilic tendencies in "Proper Condom Use", wherein the majority of sexual acts he taught to the kindergarten class involved feces or defecation. In that episode, Chef refers to Garrison as a "complete pervert".

Despite having declared himself gay, Garrison continues to appear ashamed of it as a part of his continual emotional and psychological problems. In the season three finale, "World Wide Recorder Concert", he was portrayed as in despair over the fact that his father, Garrison Senior, had not sexually abused him when Garrison was young, believing that he did not love his son. After being repeatedly pressed by his son to have sex with him, Garrison Senior has Kenny G do so. In "Chef Aid", he implies that he wishes for Chef to rape him in a prison cell, something Chef is unwilling to do. In two episodes–"An Elephant Makes Love to a Pig" and "Jakovasaurs"–Garrison was implied to have practiced bestiality with Cartman's pig and a pigeon, respectively.

Garrison is characterized as highly inept as a teacher, regularly introducing dubious curricula, such as showing Barnaby Jones videos to the class for eight days, asking the class "why Chubby Checker left the Beatles in 1972" or teaching the students how to tell the difference between a prostitute and a police officer. On the other hand, he will occasionally teach the children advanced subjects such as theories on evolution, Stalin, and communism. Despite his cynicism, he appears to genuinely enjoy his job, falling into a depression when he is fired or is suspended from teaching. He also carries a gun and badge with him in class at all times, despite being told the teachers do not carry guns.

Garrison did not have a known given name until the episode "Cherokee Hair Tampons". In that episode, his full name is Ethan P. Garrison. In "The Entity", his given name is changed to Herbert. During Garrison's presidency, he is generally not referred to by name at all, with characters only referring to him as "The President".

=== As Janet Garrison ===
In the season nine premiere, "Mr. Garrison's Fancy New Vagina", Garrison comes out as a trans woman and decides to undergo a vaginoplasty and breast augmentation. In the episode "D-Yikes!", it is revealed that she renamed herself Janet. Garrison frequently asserts her femininity, including through misandry and open proclamations of her sexuality.

The transition causes her relationship with Mr. Slave to end, as the latter had not been consulted before the operation. Garrison also realizes that she has had no menstrual periods after the operation, leading her to believe that she is pregnant. Garrison attempts to abort before she is told that her procedure does not result in the creation of reproductive organs. In the episode "Follow That Egg!", she attempts to prevent same-sex marriage from becoming legal after finding out that Mr. Slave is engaged to Big Gay Al.

In the episode "Go God Go", Garrison is ordered by the school district to teach evolution. Due to her personal aversion to the concept, she deliberately underperforms and is subsequently replaced by Richard Dawkins. Dawkins becomes attracted to Garrison, and they begin dating. Dawkins converts Garrison to atheism, and they subsequently decide to eradicate all religion from the world, leading to a future where the global populace embraces atheism and ignores logic, causing wars about the answer to "the Great Question". In the following episode, "Go God Go XII", Eric Cartman, having been cryonically frozen 500 years earlier, contacts Garrison's home from the future. Dawkins answers the phone and learns from Cartman about Garrison's previous life. Repulsed, Dawkins hastily ends his relationship with Garrison. The episode reveals that Garrison was the motivation that convinced Dawkins to teach atheism to the world, and as their relationship ended, the future changed once more.

In the episode "D-Yikes", Mrs. Garrison starts to have lesbian relationships. After an unnamed boyfriend abandons her, Garrison meets Allison, a lesbian who becomes quickly attracted to the former. Unaware of Allison's sexual orientation or growing affection, Garrison unwittingly joins her at a lesbian bar. After Garrison learns the truth, she is initially shocked but quickly returns Allison's feelings, and the two begin to date. As a result, Garrison begins openly identifying as a lesbian.

==== Detransition ====
In the episode "Eek, a Penis!", Garrison becomes disillusioned with living as a woman and wants to detransition. After hearing about genetic engineering being used to grow human body parts on mice, she pays for a procedure to grow a penis on a mouse. After Garrison spends most of the episode chasing the runaway mouse, it returns to Garrison and the sex change operation proves successful.

After his detransition between seasons 12 through 18, Garrison's behavior was shown to be less eccentric than before, with significantly fewer acts of deviant sexual behavior, outrageous outbursts, racism, or psychotic episodes. His sexual identity was left ambiguous, being shown a Republican despite his ever-changing sexual and gender identities in "About Last Night...", being absent from "Gays against faggots" in "The F Word". In "200", he at first assists Stan, Kyle and Cartman in angering Tom Cruise unintentionally, but also later is consulted by Cartman regarding the events of "Cartman's Mom Is Still a Dirty Slut", after Mitch Connor tells Cartman that the allegations Ms. Cartman was intersex and Cartman's father are a lie – while Garrison tries to steer Cartman away, Cartman convinces him to bring out Mr. Hat, and Mr. Hat confesses the declaration of Ms. Cartman being his father (and intersex) was fake and that Eric Cartman's real father was in the room. The episode ends with an abrupt cliffhanger while Garrison is about to reveal the identity of Cartman's father.

=== Presidential campaign, presidency and post-presidency ===
Garrison as president of the United States

During the nineteenth season, following Principal Victoria's replacement with PC Principal, Garrison becomes frustrated with a recent influx of illegal Canadian immigrants. He begins denigrating the immigrants and is consequently dismissed from his teaching job. He begins a political campaign on promises to get rid of the immigrants and build a wall, parodying Donald Trump's then-current presidential campaign. After discovering Canada has already built a wall, Garrison goes over Niagara Falls to Canada and rapes the Canadian President—a caricature of Trump—to death. Convinced that his policies work, Garrison continues his campaign with Caitlyn Jenner as his running mate. The episode "Sponsored Content" features Principal Victoria convincing Garrison to return to South Park.

Parker and Stone had expected Trump's campaign to end before the 2016 election. They opined that a direct portrayal of Trump would be dated if the campaign ended quickly, and felt it would be more appropriate to use one of their characters in his role, having already decided Garrison would come into conflict with the new principal.

In the following seasons, Garrison receives the Republican Party nomination and continues his campaign. He realizes that he will be incapable of actually performing his duties as the president if he is elected, and tries to sabotage his own campaign, even outright telling people to vote for Hillary Clinton instead of him. While his attempts are initially unsuccessful, he eventually manages to lower his poll numbers by making inflammatory comments about women. As he attempts to tell his supporters that the election is rigged against him, they realize that he had never intended to actually make it as far as he did and furiously pursue him. Seeking refuge in a support group run by Randy Marsh, Garrison learns that people want him to become president because J. J. Abrams brainwashed people into liking Star Wars: The Force Awakens using Member Berries. After failing to destroy the Member Berries, Garrison makes a speech urging Americans to vote for Clinton in protest of the new film.

Despite his efforts, Garrison is elected president and brainwashed by Jenner, who herself was brainwashed by the Member Berries. Upon winning the election, he uses his newfound power to force people with whom he has had altercations to perform fellatio on him. Garrison plays a role in the season twenty finale by helping to defeat the season's other antagonists while remaining in power.

Parker and Stone expected Clinton to win the election, and revealed that they waited for the election to end to focus on other storylines, intending for a humbled Garrison to return to teaching. Garrison was also intended to play a role in resolving the conflict between the male and female students at the school classroom that had developed over the course of the season, taking responsibility for causing their behavior. Following Trump's win, Parker and Stone were consequently forced to rewrite the season's final episodes, and felt that they could not resolve some of the season's storylines in a satisfying way as a result.

The twenty-first season sees a desperate Garrison returning to South Park after launching a nuclear strike against Canada in "Super Hard PCness". Garrison was absent in all but one episode of the following season, appearing in a cameo in the season finale, "Bike Parade". He reappears in "Season Finale", giving legal advice to Randy after he is arrested.

Garrison appears in "The Pandemic Special" as an antagonist who wants to prolong the COVID-19 pandemic, as the virus is also killing Mexicans. At the end of the episode, Garrison kills the pangolin being researched in for vaccine development with a flamethrower, along with the scientist holding the pangolin. In "South ParQ Vaccination Special", Garrison returns to South Park after losing the 2020 election to return to teaching, but is opposed by everyone except the QAnon-adhering White family. Garrison pleads to the elites, who are toying with him and Bob White, to return his life to normal; he later regains the townspeople's respect after securing COVID-19 vaccines for everyone with the elites' help.

In the twenty-fifth season, Mr. Garrison started dating a man named Rick in the episode "Pajama Day". Garrison's relationship with Rick is tested in the season twenty-six finale "Spring Break" when Garrison is pressured by his supporters to run for president again in 2024. Garrison is forced to choose between his relationship with Rick and personal gain, ultimately choosing the former. Garrison returns to Rick, and the two reconcile. Immediately there is a repeat of the Capitol Attack in Washington DC, with actual live action footage, but it's a celebration from his supporters that Garrison and Rick decided to stay together, rather than a shift in power. In the twenty-seventh season premiere "Sermon on the 'Mount", a mob of South Park residents enter Garrison's house, assuming he had been reelected. However, Garrison is simply watching television with Rick, and instead Donald Trump is shown in the White House in a similar fashion to the show's earlier depiction of Saddam Hussein.

== Mr. Hat ==
Mr. Hat (left) and Mr. Twig (right)

Mr. Hat initially appears to be simply a puppet used by Mr. Garrison as a teaching aid. However, in some episodes, Mr. Hat is able to perform activities that would not have been possible if he were merely a puppet. In the show, it is not entirely clear how much autonomy Mr. Hat and Mr. Garrison have from each other. In the episode "Chef Aid", Mr. Hat is able to drive a car through a prison wall to rescue Mr. Garrison and Chef, to which Chef remarks, "How the hell did he reach the gas pedal?".

Other episodes also portray Mr. Hat as somewhat autonomous. In one episode, Mr. Hat is able to move his eyes and blink towards Mr. Garrison and Brett Favre, and in "Worldwide Recorder Concert", Mr. Hat beats up Mr. Mackey. In the South Park video game, Mr. Hat owns and runs a robot factory by himself. In South Park: Bigger, Longer & Uncut, Satan picks up Mr. Hat as a companion to replace Saddam Hussein. Satan speaks Mr. Hat's lines in a voice very similar to Mr. Garrison's.

Mr. Hat is portrayed as racist, as seen in "Chef Goes Nanners", where he is a member of the South Park branch of the Ku Klux Klan. Mr. Hat argues with Mr. Garrison and seemingly disappears to attend a meeting without him. Mr. Hat also appears to be somewhat psychotic. In "Weight Gain 4000", furious at Kathie Lee Gifford for a talent show he and Mr. Garrison had lost years ago, Mr. Hat convinces Mr. Garrison to kill her, which he attempts to do. It is unclear in the show if Mr. Hat is independent or if Mr. Garrison's own psychosis is projected to his puppet.

In "Summer Sucks", during a fictional crossover psychotherapy session with Dr. Katz (from another Comedy Central series), Katz suggests that Mr. Hat is a personification of Mr. Garrison's "gay side". Garrison rejects this, and Katz is unable to make a counterpoint because he is killed shortly afterward by a gigantic novelty firework. Despite this suggestion, Mr. Garrison continues to use Mr. Hat even after coming out as gay. Mr. Hat is permanently abandoned in favor of Mr. Slave when Mr. Garrison begins teaching fourth grade.

Parker and Stone have said that the removal of Mr. Hat was symbolic of the show abandoning its original style as a surreal comedy in favor of its current format of satirizing real-life issues and events. Mr. Hat was not seen again until the climax of the episode "200", when Eric Cartman demands to speak with him, at which point Mr. Garrison produces Mr. Hat from a dresser drawer, and despite his initial reluctance, Garrison again seems unable to control Mr. Hat, and again addresses him separately. At the conclusion of the storyline, Mr. Hat is again discarded, subsequently appearing briefly in the game South Park: The Stick of Truth and the 2021 special South ParQ Vaccination Special.

=== Mr. Twig ===
Starting in the episode "Summer Sucks", Mr. Garrison temporarily replaces Mr. Hat with Mr. Twig, who consists of a twig wearing a purple shirt with a pink triangle symbol. His voice is identical to Mr. Hat's until his final scene in "Chef Aid", where he speaks with a French accent. Mr. Twig is poorly received by the children in Garrison's third grade class, who repeatedly call for the return of Mr. Hat and suggest that Mr. Twig would be better used as a coat rack, to which Garrison takes offense. Eventually, Mr. Hat returns in "Chef Aid", heralding the fact by some psychopathic attacks on Mr. Twig. Though Garrison constantly assures himself that Mr. Twig is a better choice than Mr. Hat, he comes to terms with his attachment to Mr. Hat at the end of the episode upon being broken out of jail by him. Garrison reunites with Mr. Hat after Mr. Twig advises him to follow his heart.

== See also ==
- List of South Park characters
