= Scott Tenorman Must Die =

- South Park episode
- Episode no.: Season 5 Episode 4
- Directed by: Eric Stough
- Written by: Trey Parker
- Editing by: Keef Bartkus
- Production code: 501
- Original air date: July 11, 2001

Guest appearances
- Thom Yorke as himself; Jonny Greenwood as himself; Colin Greenwood as himself; Ed O'Brien as himself; Philip Selway as himself

Episode chronology
← Previous "Super Best Friends"	Next → "Terrance and Phillip: Behind the Blow"
- South Park season 5

"Scott Tenorman Must Die" is the fourth episode of the fifth season of the American animated television series South Park, and the 69th episode of the series overall, first aired on Comedy Central in the United States on July 11, 2001. The plot sees ninth-grader Scott Tenorman, voiced by Toby Morton, trick Eric Cartman into buying his pubic hair, so an angry Cartman plots revenge.

South Park creators Trey Parker and Matt Stone point to this episode as a milestone in the series. The episode introduced significant changes in the characterization of Cartman, setting the standard for his psychopathic antics in the following seasons; it also prompted the creators to only focus on one plot within an episode, whereas the show's earlier episodes involved several loosely related subplots that merged in the episode's final act. "Scott Tenorman Must Die" was written by Parker, and directed by animation director Eric Stough. The English rock band Radiohead guest star in the episode as themselves.

"Scott Tenorman Must Die" received widespread acclaim upon release; it is often considered by critics to be one of the best South Park episodes, as well as one of the greatest sitcom episodes of all time.

== Plot ==
Eric Cartman boasts to Stan Marsh, Kenny McCormick and Kyle Broflovski that he is the first to reach puberty, since he has gotten his first pubic hairs. However, not knowing that "getting pubes" means growing them yourself, Cartman only has pubic hair because he bought a handful of it from high schooler Scott Tenorman for $10. Outraged at having been conned, Cartman tries various methods to get his money back but is constantly outwitted by Scott. After Scott makes Cartman beg for the money and sing that he is a "little piggy", Scott burns the money in front of him, after which Cartman starts to plot revenge.

Cartman attempts to train a pony to bite off Scott's penis, but Jimbo Kern later tells him that the best way to humiliate Scott is to find and exploit his weaknesses. After learning that Scott's favorite band is Radiohead, Cartman has the town see a video clip of them being interviewed, with the band members' audio poorly dubbed over by Cartman, making them say how much they hate Scott. However, Scott one-ups Cartman by showing a video of Cartman doing his piggy song. Everyone laughs at Cartman's humiliation, including Kenny who literally laughs himself to death. Enraged, Cartman writes a letter to Radiohead to get them to visit South Park, claiming that Scott is a victim of "cancer, in his ass". Cartman tells Stan and Kyle of his plan to get Scott's penis bitten off at a chili cook-off, which Radiohead would arrive at and see him crying, making them think lowly of Scott. Afterward, due to disliking Cartman, Stan and Kyle warn Scott. Cartman then arrives and gives Scott his invitation and a ticket for a pony ride. After Cartman leaves, Scott tells his parents of the pony on the farm, which prompts his parents to go and save it that night. Also, in an attempt to publicly humiliate Cartman again, Scott cooks a chili intentionally contaminated with the pubic hair of every teenager in town.

The next day at the cook-off, both Scott and Chef bring chili for the competition, as does Cartman. After they sit down to eat, Scott eats some of Cartman's chili while Cartman eats Scott's, much to the quiet enjoyment of the onlookers, who are in on Scott's prank. As Cartman is finishing Scott's chili, Scott prepares to tell him the secret ingredient, but to everyone's surprise, Cartman then reveals that he already knew, and the chili he is eating is not Scott's, as Cartman switched it with Chef's. Cartman admits that he planned for Stan and Kyle to warn Scott about his plan for revenge, and that his actual plan was to get Mr. Denkins, the farmer who owns the pony, to shoot and kill Scott's parents for trespassing. While Denkins was speaking to the police, Cartman stole the corpses, chopped them up, and placed their body parts into the chili Scott was eating. Scott finds his mother's finger in the bowl, vomits, and starts crying. The members of Radiohead come along and – unaware of what just happened – make fun of Scott for crying. Finally, Cartman begins licking the "tears of unfathomable sadness" from Scott's face, while Stan and Kyle, horrified at the lengths to which Cartman went for revenge, agree to never anger him to the extent Scott did again.

== Production and broadcast ==
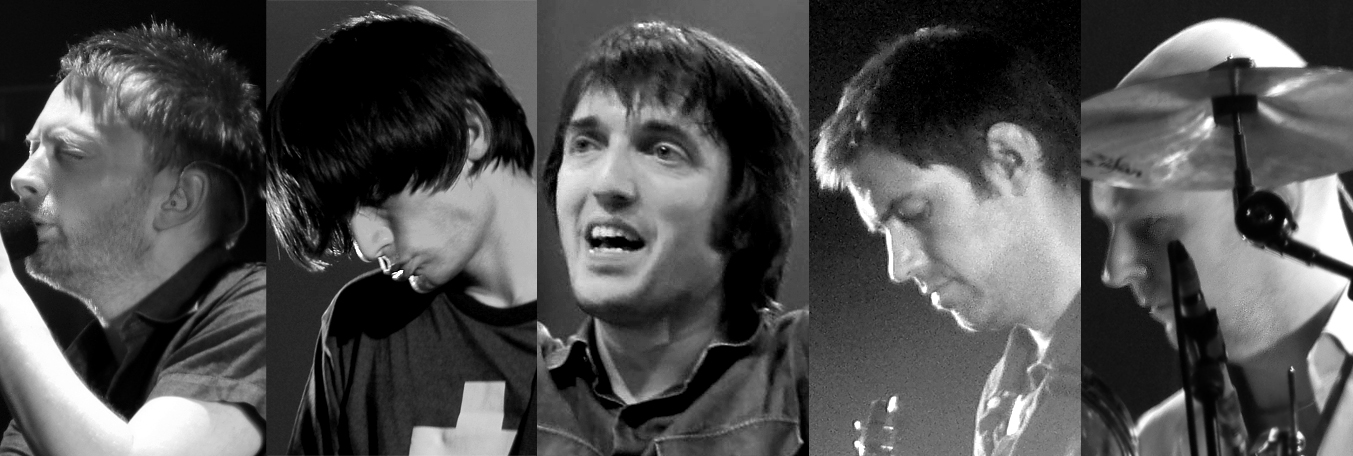
Members of the English rock band Radiohead appear in the episode, and provide the voiceovers for their characters.

According to South Park creators Trey Parker and Matt Stone, "Scott Tenorman Must Die" represented significant shifts both in the writing of the show and the characterization of Eric Cartman. Although originally just an annoying, spoiled child, Cartman got somewhat meaner over the course of the show's previous episodes. However, with "Scott Tenorman Must Die", he became "the most evil kid in the world", and got progressively darker throughout the series' run. The creators debated whether it was okay to have Cartman kill Scott's parents and feed them to him, as it was a "crazy [thing] to do with a kid", and would be setting a new bar for the series and the character. Eventually, after having debated the issue at length, the writers decided to go ahead with the idea. However, they found it very important to make sure that Cartman did not kill Scott's parents by having to "pull the trigger himself".

Parker and Stone have also named the episode as a milestone in the writing of South Park, as the first episode to have only a single plot, without a subplot (that is, a B story or even a C story) to support the episode. The creators could only come up with the cat and mouse situation between Cartman and Tenorman, which they had described as reminiscent of the relationships in classic cartoons such as Tom and Jerry and Wile E. Coyote and Road Runner. The creators feared that not having a subplot would negatively affect the episode, but upon finishing, they realized that a single, strong plot worked well. Since then, many episodes have contained just one plotline, or two strongly related stories. "Scott Tenorman Must Die" was written by Trey Parker, and directed by South Park animation director Eric Stough. Whereas most episodes of South Park are created within a single week, writing on this episode began in the middle of May 2001, more than a month before the start of the season on June 20, and the episode was assigned a production code number of 501 (meaning the 1st episode of the 5th season). The early start was because the creators sometimes try to have one episode "in the bank" – meaning that they have "at least half-start[ed]" animating it. This way they can take off a few days during the two-month-long, demanding run, and then go back and finish work on the banked show.

The episode's first draft was written during the time when Parker and Stone were still finishing editing the last episode of their other TV show, 2001's That's My Bush! In its first draft, the episode's title was "Scott Tenorall Must Die", but Parker decided to change the character's name afterwards, as he thought that Tenorman sounded funnier. By the end of May, several drafts of the episode had been completed, and animation production had started. By early June, writing on episode 502 (which became "It Hits the Fan") had started, and the creators decided to make that the season premiere. Before the season started, "Scott Tenorman Must Die" was pushed back as the fourth episode of the run. The episode eventually aired on July 11, 2001, on Comedy Central in the United States, after "It Hits the Fan", "Cripple Fight" and "Super Best Friends". The original broadcast of the show did not have a visible ghost of Kenny, when he laughed himself to death. This was added by the episode's rerun on the following Saturday. Minor modifications like this occasionally happen on South Park, given the rush the creators are in when delivering the show on the day of its broadcast.

The script of the episode reveals some minor differences from the finished episode. After the long "mad scientist" scene of Cartman designing the plans for his revenge, it was supposed to be revealed that whatever he was drawing so intently was "only a stupid crayon drawing of a pony". In the finished episode, Cartman's drawing is not revealed; however, the pony drawing is featured earlier in the episode, during Cartman's briefing to the children. In the scene where Scott Tenorman burns the money in front of Cartman, the script direction said that Cartman should look like William Wallace in the 1995 historical drama film Braveheart, at the moment he realizes that he was betrayed. Within the same scene, it is written that Cartman would fall down on the muddy lawn, and then use the mud to put war paint on his face. The pubic hairs in the episode were scanned-in hairs from the back of the neck of Adrien Beard, South Park's lead storyboarder. The members of the band Radiohead – Thom Yorke, Jonny Greenwood, Colin Greenwood, Ed O'Brien and Philip Selway – provided their voice for their characters. The band was on tour in Santa Barbara, and Matt Stone drove there from Los Angeles to record their lines. While directing singer Thom Yorke, Stone told him to "emote more", as his acting was not exaggerated enough for animation voiceovers. Stone found it ironic to direct Yorke to put more emotion into his delivery, considering that Yorke is "brilliant at emoting perfectly, exactly, in such a complex and beautiful way" when he sings. The episode also features regular voice acting from Parker and Stone for most characters, as well as Eliza Schneider and Mona Marshall for female voices. Scott Tenorman's voice was provided by Toby Morton.

== Cultural references and themes ==
Scott Tenorman's favorite band is the British rock band Radiohead. When Jimbo does not know what "a radiohead" is, Cartman and Ned sing him part of their 1992 song "Creep". In Cartman's dubbed video, the band is interviewed on MTV by long-time MTV host Kurt Loder. Loder had previously been parodied in the fourth season episode "Timmy 2000". During one of his earlier attempts at tricking Scott into giving back his money, Cartman mentions that rock singer Courtney Love is in South Park, drunk and engaging in public nudity. Cartman's inspiration for the idea of having Scott's penis bitten off by a pony is the film Hannibal, in which "the deformed guy trained giant pigs to eat his enemy alive".

The very ending of the episode, where the iris appears, is an allusion to the Looney Tunes cartoons, with Cartman assuming the role of the stuttering Porky Pig, delivering his signature line "That's all folks!" The use of the Looney Tunes ending has been seen as an ironic reinforcement of the fact that the episode's tragic plot has overstepped the established boundaries of cartoon comedy. It also has been viewed as a reminder about the fact that even the classic cartoons had "a dark side in their own right".

The plot of "Scott Tenorman Must Die" has been compared to that of the Shakespeare tragedy Titus Andronicus, in which the humiliated protagonist also exacts revenge by feeding his enemies their own relatives. Some authors viewed the episode as not only an allusion to the violent Shakespearean tragedy, but an actual retelling of it.

== Reception and impact ==
"Scott Tenorman Must Die" is one of the most acclaimed episodes of South Park, and, according to Stone, is one of the show's most notorious episodes. It was named one of the best sitcom episodes of all time by Vulture, one of the best sitcom episodes since 1990 by The A.V. Club, and one of the best TV episodes of the 21st century by The Plain Dealer. It has also topped various best-of lists for South Park episodes, including those by IGN, Variety, Kotaku, Boston.com, and The Ringer. The episode was included in the top five of lists of the best South Park episodes published by The Daily Telegraph and TechRadar, and was called one of the show's best episodes of all time by Time and The Verge.

Digital Spy and Special Broadcasting Service listed "Scott Tenorman Must Die" as one of the most controversial South Park episodes. Rolling Stone listed Cartman feeding Scott Tenorman his own parents as the second-best South Park moment, calling the episode "the perfect high-low amalgamation of the show's ability to be both shocking and brilliant at the same time", and IGN named Cartman describing Scott Tenorman's tears as "yummy" his best line from the show. Parker and Stone chose the episode as one of their eleven favorites in 2003, and one of their ten favorites in 2006. Fans voted the episode into the 2nd place in a major 2011 South Park vote held under the "Year of the Fan" promotion.

The events of this episode are given new meaning in the season fourteen episode "201", in which Scott returns as the leader of the Ginger Separatist Movement, revealing to Cartman that, while researching his revenge upon Cartman, Scott learned that his own father Jack Tenorman (a fictional Denver Broncos right tackle) had fathered Cartman through an affair with Liane Cartman. This means that Eric Cartman unknowingly orchestrated his own father's death and fed him to his half-brother in "Scott Tenorman Must Die". Cartman is horrified by this revelation, not because he was responsible for his own father's death, but for realizing that he is part ginger.

In the 2009 video game South Park Let's Go Tower Defense Play!, the player has to fight Scott Tenorman in a boss fight. In the 2012 game South Park: Tenorman's Revenge, the player is able to control the four main characters of the show, who have to battle Tenorman and his army of gingers, as the kids travel through time.

== Home media ==
"Scott Tenorman Must Die" was released on VHS in June 2002, along with the episodes "It Hits the Fan" and "Cripple Fight", on a video titled Insults to Injuries. A DVD version of the compilation was released simultaneously, and also contained "Proper Condom Use", in addition to the episodes contained on the VHS release. South Park: The Complete Fifth Season was released on DVD in 2005. South Park – The Hits: Volume 1, a DVD compilation which features Parker and Stone's ten favorite episodes, was released in 2006, and contains the episode. Parker and Stone provided short audio commentary for the episode on both The Complete Fifth Season and The Hits DVDs. "Scott Tenorman Must Die" was also released as part of The Cult of Cartman, a 2008 DVD compilation of Cartman-centric episodes.
