= The Entity (South Park) =

- South Park episode
- Episode no.: Season 5 Episode 11
- Directed by: Trey Parker
- Written by: Trey Parker
- Production code: 511
- Original air date: November 21, 2001

Episode chronology
← Previous "How to Eat with Your Butt"	Next → "Here Comes the Neighborhood"
- South Park season 5

"The Entity" is the eleventh episode of the fifth season of the animated television series South Park, and 76th episode of the series overall. "The Entity" originally aired in the United States on November 21, 2001 on Comedy Central. This episode introduces Kyle's cousin Kyle. Creators Trey Parker and Matt Stone have stated the story was inspired by the Segway PT and the general chaotic nature of airports at the time of the production, shortly following 9/11 and the 2001 airline bailout.

In the episode, Kyle's cousin Kyle, who is stereotypically Jewish, comes to South Park for a visit. Meanwhile, Mr. Garrison comes up with a "more pleasant" alternative to airline travel, known as "IT."

== Plot ==
Kyle's cousin, Kyle Schwartz from Connecticut, comes to live in South Park due to his mother's failing health back at home. While Kyle was initially excited about seeing his cousin for the first time, he is baffled to see that his cousin is none other than a stereotyped version of a Jew, and has many irritating characteristics such as hypochondria. Kyle is told by his mother to take care of his cousin. Kyle, fearing that Cartman, a staunch anti-Semite, will "tear this kid apart", attempts to bribe Cartman with $40 to not make fun of him. Cartman, in an attempt to earn the bribe, struggles to avoid mocking Kyle's cousin, but eventually fails. The boys decide that Kyle's cousin is just way too irritating to live in South Park with them. Much of the episode proceeds to have the boys make constant attempts to get rid of Kyle Schwartz. In one attempt to trick him into boarding a plane to Antarctica, But however, Kyle's cousin always finds a way to come back to South Park.

John Travolta riding "IT"

Meanwhile, Mr. Garrison, annoyed and fed up with the inefficient and incompetent airline check-ins since 9/11, decides to invent his own vehicle. Inspired by watching Enrique Iglesias' sexualized singing on TV and by a gyroscope sitting next to him on his deck, he invents the gyroscope-powered monowheel "IT." According to Mr. Garrison, "IT" can "go up to two hundred miles per hour, and gets three hundred miles to the gallon". The only problem is that "IT" is controlled through a quite painful and unappealing method: using four "flexi-grip handles" that somewhat resemble erect penises; two held in the hands, one in the mouth, and a fourth handle which is inserted into the anus. Garrison invites many important investors (among them, Steve Jobs, Bill Gates, and Donald Trump) to see his demonstration of "IT". Despite this unorthodox control mechanism, "IT" is still considered better than dealing with the airlines and Garrison's creation is a smashing success. This results in a lack of passengers and business in airports.

Unfortunately, things go downhill when the government decides to bail out the airlines from going under because of "IT". To ensure the airlines' dominance as a mode of transport and the job security of everyone working for it, the government ends up outlawing "IT", deems using it a criminal act and confiscates all of the "IT" stock. As a result, Kyle's cousin, who turns out to have invested in "IT", gets a $5 million bailout payment and decides to return home to Connecticut to take care of his sick mother. After hearing of this great fortune, the boys suddenly change their plan and try to convince him to stay with them, but he rejects them, revealing he sees them as stereotypical hicks.

== Production ==
According to the creator commentary, the depiction of Kyle's cousin was partially based on their experience working with radio host Dennis Prager. The "IT" vehicle was based on the pre-release hype surrounding the Segway, which prior to its public reveal was known only by the code-name "It," and was the subject of much speculation.

== Home media ==
"The Entity," along with the thirteen other episodes from South Park: the Complete Fifth Season, was released on a three-disc DVD set in the United States on February 22, 2005. The set includes brief audio commentaries by Parker and Stone for each episode.
