= Starvin' Marvin =

- South Park episode
- Episode no.: Season 1 Episode 8
- Directed by: Trey Parker
- Written by: Trey Parker; Matt Stone; Pam Brady
- Production code: 109
- Original air date: November 19, 1997

Episode chronology
← Previous "Pinkeye"	Next → "Mr. Hankey, the Christmas Poo"
- South Park season 1

"Starvin' Marvin" is the eighth episode of the first season of the American animated television series South Park. It first aired on Comedy Central in the United States on November 19, 1997. In the episode, Cartman, Kenny, Kyle and Stan send money to an African charity hoping to get a sports watch, but are instead sent an Ethiopian child whom they dub "Starvin' Marvin". Later, Cartman is accidentally sent to Ethiopia, where he learns activist Sally Struthers is hoarding the charity's food for herself. In an accompanying subplot, after genetically engineered turkeys attack South Park residents, Chef rallies the residents to fight back, in a parody of the film Braveheart.

The episode was written and directed by series co-creator Trey Parker, being his first solo credit as writer-director for the show and was also the first South Park Thanksgiving-themed episode. It simultaneously served as a satire on American indifference toward impoverished countries, and on the humanitarianism industry.

The episode received generally positive reviews, and several commentators have described it as a classic South Park episode. According to Nielsen Media Research, it was watched by 3.68 million viewers during its original broadcast. Parker and Stone said they were unhappy with the turkey subplot, which they wrote only because they felt obligated to include a B story. Sally Struthers was reportedly deeply offended by her portrayal in the episode. In addition to Starvin' Marvin, who became a popular minor character, the episode introduced regular characters like Kenny's family members Stuart, Carol, and Kevin McCormick.

== Plot ==
After seeing a commercial about starving children in Africa, Cartman, Stan, Kenny and Kyle send money to Sally Struthers' charity organization, the Christian Children's Fund. They do not care about the cause, but want the free sports watch that comes with the sponsorship. However, due to a miscommunication, an Ethiopian boy is delivered to the boys instead of the watch. Although initially shocked, the four boys befriend him, and Cartman names the boy Starvin' Marvin ("Marvin" being given to him by the apparent pronunciation of his name when he was talking in his native language). Meanwhile, mobs of wild turkeys begin attacking and killing South Park residents. The mad scientist Dr. Mephesto tries to warn Mayor McDaniels that genetically engineered turkeys he had been breeding to feed to the poor have gone crazy and are now attacking humans. Mephesto is instead ignored and ridiculed by McDaniels.

The boys take Marvin to an all-you-can-eat buffet, where he is shocked by how much food the townsfolk consume compared with his home country, and by how wasteful Cartman is with his food. Back at school, Mr. Garrison announces the food drive is a failure because students have brought in only a few cans of creamed corn. The boys present Marvin to the class during show and tell, after which Mr. Garrison and Principal Victoria tell the boys they will have to call the Red Cross and send Marvin home. Meanwhile, Dr. Mephesto shows Chef that the turkey DNA is growing so rapidly that the turkeys might take over the world if they are not stopped.

The FBI arrives to take Marvin back to Ethiopia, but Marvin tricks them into taking Cartman instead. Cartman, who had previously cared little for the impoverished in Africa, is unable to bear the lack of food and poor living conditions there; furthermore, he attempts to convince the Red Cross there that he's not one of the Africans, but fails. While praying to God in Addis Ababa, Cartman says he is sorry he made fun of poor people. He eventually finds a Red Cross shack, where Sally Struthers is hoarding all the food meant for charity. After a brief argument, Cartman exposes all of Struthers's hoarding of the food supply to the Ethiopians, who then take control of the food supply.

Back in South Park, Chef rallies the townspeople (in a parody of Braveheart) to fight the genetically engineered turkeys; in response, one of the turkeys also rallies the other turkeys to fight the townspeople. A massive battle ensues in which Kenny is killed (his eye is poked and gouged out), but eventually the South Park residents kill all the turkeys and claim victory. The FBI returns Cartman to South Park and takes Marvin home, but not before he brings the bodies of the dead turkeys back to Ethiopia for everyone to eat. Marvin is then hailed as a hero by his people while they pass Struthers being bound and gagged over a fire.

In the end, back in South Park, Kenny's family give their Thanksgiving blessings as they prepare to eat a can of green beans, but realize afterward that they do not have a can opener.

== Production ==
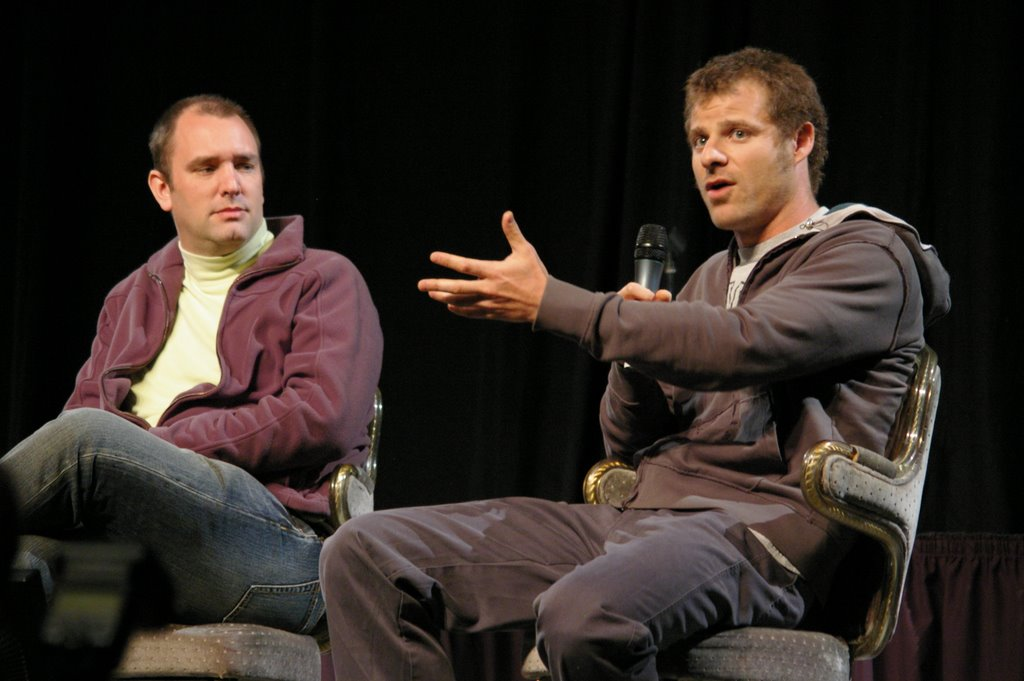
South Park co-creators Trey Parker and Matt Stone wrote "Starvin' Marvin" along with writer Pam Brady.

"Starvin' Marvin" was written by Trey Parker, Matt Stone, and Pam Brady. Directed by Parker, it was the first official South Park Thanksgiving episode. Parker and Stone said "Starvin' Marvin", like other holiday episodes, proved difficult to make because they felt a responsibility to constantly top other previous holiday shows. Stone provided the voice of Marvin. According to the official South Park website, the character was not named after the Starvin' Marvin's brand of American gas stations, and the similarity between the two names is just a coincidence. Jerry Seinfeld, comedian and star of the popular sitcom Seinfeld, contacted Parker and Stone and asked if he could record a guest voice performance because he was a fan of the show. Parker and Stone offered Seinfeld the throwaway background part of one of the turkeys, but Seinfeld's agent was "a bit put off" by the offer and did not accept.

The episode was partially inspired by the commercials for the Christian Children's Fund, in which Sally Struthers encourages viewers to donate money to provide food for starving children in Africa. Parker said he did not really believe Struthers was hoarding food from the charity, but he came up with the concept because he found it funny that such an obese woman would make a public plea for food for others. Parker said he had always wondered how a starving African child would react if they were taken to a large buffet dinner at an American restaurant, with "people leaving tons of food on their plates", which served as further inspiration for the episode. Parker and Stone originally planned for Struthers to die at the end of the episode and have the African children eat her and live off her fat; Comedy Central executives told the duo they could not kill Struthers, although celebrities have been killed off in subsequent episodes without any objections from the network.

Parker and Stone were unhappy with the turkey attack subplot, which they felt "never really went anywhere" and ended abruptly without any satisfying conclusion. They nevertheless included it because they felt obligated to include a B story, since every episode in the season so far had included one. Later in the series, they said they realized this was not necessary and made many episodes without a B story. Although the duo liked the "payoff" of the Starvin' Marvin main plot, they did not know how to end the turkey subplot, so they simply had the characters kill all the turkeys and claim that there were none left; they decided this sudden ending was the funniest possible option. Stone said of the subplot, "The turkeys were just an excuse to have the Braveheart sequence." The animators enjoyed creating the turkey battle scene, which was designed to be shown in widescreen aspect ratio while the rest of the episode was animated normally. However, the animation proved to be very difficult and took a long time to do because it involved a larger number of characters and animals in one scene than had ever been featured previously in the show. Some of the characters in the far background were animated in a gray and shadowy style, which Parker said was not so much a visual effect as it was a "lighting effect meaning we didn't want to draw all these people".

In addition to Starvin' Marvin himself, the episode included the first appearances of several regular characters: Kyle's father Gerald Broflovski, as well as Stuart, Carol, and Kevin McCormick, father, mother, and brother (respectively) of Kenny, who were portrayed as incredibly poor and unhygienic. In a continuity error, the couple killed by the turkeys at Stark's Pond can be seen alive and unharmed during the turkey battle scene.

== Themes ==
Psychologists Gilbert Reyes and Gerard Jacobs have cited "Starvin' Marvin" as one example of popular culture voicing criticisms of humanitarianism "as an overblown industry leeching off others' suffering and harming its purported beneficiaries". The episode also highlights America's consumerist society and American indifference toward impoverished countries. The moral of the episode, explained by Stan in the final scene, encourages viewers to see suffering citizens of impoverished countries as real people, rather than images on television screens, which tend to make the viewers feel detached and alienated from them.

"Starvin' Marvin" explores and satirizes gluttony in the US, particularly through its unflattering portrayal of Sally Struthers, who gorges on donated food meant for starving children. The greed and wastefulness shown in the buffet scene, as well as Cartman's overall greediness and lack of understanding regarding the plight of starving African children, has been said to demonstrate an over-abundance and decadence typically associated with Americans. The destructive rampage of the turkeys provides a commentary on genetic engineering. Scott Calef, a philosophy professor who studies popular culture, said the destruction caused by the turkeys, despite the best of intentions by Dr. Mephesto, is indicative of the unpredictable nature and ethical ambiguity of the use of genetic engineering for the betterment of humankind.

== Cultural references and impact ==
Starvin' Marvin proved to be a popular minor character, even though he would appear in only one more episode, the third season episode "Starvin' Marvin in Space". The character was later featured in South Park Rally, a 2000 racing video game from developer Acclaim, in which Marvin races the other characters in a motorized wheat sack. Marvin is also featured in South Park 10: The Game, a platform mobile game featuring a number of South Park characters. Eric Cartman's line, "That's a bad Starvin' Marvin!", became one of the most popular lines from the first season of the show. Starvin' Marvin is from the African nation Ethiopia, which experienced two famines in the mid-1980s. The American authorities who address his parents identify his family's surname as "Click Click Derk".

The scenes in which Chef, and later the lead turkey, don blue and white war paint and speak inspirational words to their armies are a parody of Braveheart, the 1995 Mel Gibson-directed film about Scottish historical hero William Wallace. Parker said it was the first of many times a film was spoofed in a South Park episode, even though both he and Stone enjoyed Braveheart. During class, Mr. Garrison incorrectly tells the children the internationally known English pop singer Engelbert Humperdinck was the first man to walk on the Moon. Also in the classroom, when it is suggested some poor people would rather die than go to a poorhouse, Cartman says, "Well then perhaps they should – and decrease the surplus population!" The line is lifted word-for-word from the Charles Dickens novella A Christmas Carol, prompting Mr. Garrison to respond, "Okay, kids, that's enough Dickens for one day." Kyle incorrectly tells Stan that Sally Struthers appeared on Full House, an American sitcom that ran from 1987 to 1995; she actually starred in the 1970s series All in the Family. When Dr. Mephesto asks Chef to look into his microscope, Chef says he sees "an extreme close-up of Vanessa Redgrave's private parts", a reference to the Academy Award-winning English actress. At the end of the episode, Stan says it is important to remember the images of starving children on television are "just as real as you or I." Kyle says by that logic, MacGyver is a real person too, a reference to the secret agent protagonist from the 1980s television series of the same name.

Tom Vogt, who served as the editor of South Park for several years, watched a bootleg copy of "Starvin' Marvin" and several other episodes of South Park before driving to Colorado to seek a job with the show. He was hired as the editor after contacting one of the South Park animators who used to work for the same company as he had.

== Release and reception ==
"Starvin' Marvin" first aired in the United States on Comedy Central on November 19, 1997. In its original American broadcast, "Starvin' Marvin" received a Nielsen rating of 4.8, meaning the episode was seen by about 2.2 million households in the US. Television journalists described the rating as "astonishing" by Comedy Central standards; at the time, the network averaged a 0.6 rating (276,000 households) during prime time, and prior to South Park, the channel's highest rating was a 2.7 (1.24 million households) for the second-season premiere of Absolutely Fabulous. Several reviewers have described "Starvin' Marvin" as one of South Park's "classic episodes". Parker said the emotional moment when Starvin' Marvin returned home with all the turkeys made his mother cry, marking the first time he and Stone heard of an emotional reaction to their show.

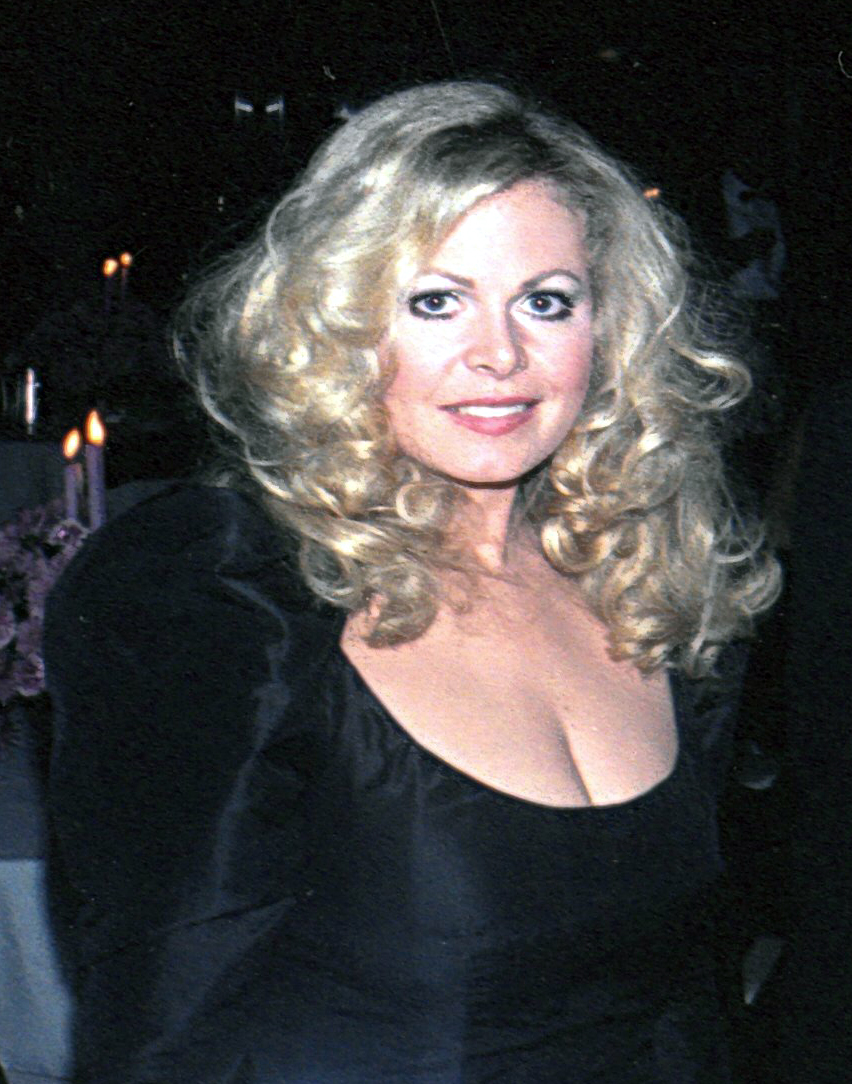
Sally Struthers, actress and activist with the Christian Children's Fund, was reportedly offended and saddened by her portrayal in "Starvin' Marvin".

After the episode aired, Parker and Stone received feedback that audiences felt "Starvin' Marvin" was especially unkind to Struthers. Although they did not speak to her themselves, the duo received word that Struthers was a fan of the show until "Starvin' Marvin" aired, after which she was very upset and reportedly reacted emotionally over her portrayal. Struthers was particularly saddened by the fact that her character steals food from the same starving children she had been working to help. Parker and Stone were slightly remorseful when they learned of her reaction, and have said they did not have anything against Struthers personally. Nevertheless, Struthers was portrayed in an even less flattering way in the third season episode "Starvin' Marvin in Space" as a Jabba the Hutt-like creature. In a DVD commentary track, Parker said of Struthers, "Dude, you're really setting yourself up if you're going to be that fat and go on the air talking about [starving children]. ... We don't think she's a bad person, she's probably nice to try to do this, but cut down on the Twinkies a little bit before going on the air."

Tom Carson, television critic for The Village Voice, praised the episode, which he said "featured some amazing sick jokes about American affluence and obliviousness". Dianne Williamson of the Telegram & Gazette praised "Starvin' Marvin" for taking a chance with the source material, and said, "Often I'm in awe at the courage of these [South Park] creators." The Advertiser of Lafayette, Louisiana, called the episode "hysterical" and particularly praised its satire of American consumerism. The St. Paul Pioneer Press described the episode as "hilarious" and said, "We know we shouldn't laugh, but we can't help it." Vicki Englund of The Courier-Mail complimented the "really bizarre storyline" and the moral of the episode, and especially praised the jokes about Struthers: "It might be a good idea not to eat during the hilarious second episode. Enough said."

In 1998, Vern Perry, a reviewer with the Orange County Register, called "Starvin' Marvin" his favorite South Park episode. The "Starvin' Marvin" episode was featured in a 1998 Chicago Tribune list of the top ten reasons for the popularity of South Park. The Chicago Tribune also included "Starvin' Marvin" in a 2003 list of the top ten funniest episodes. Bill Ward, of the Star Tribune, described "Starvin' Marvin" as Cartman's "finest half-hour." Not all reviews were positive; Boston Globe writer Matthew Gilbert, who described South Park as immature and low-brow, called "Starvin' Marvin" a particularly "uncuddly episode". Brian Boyd of The Irish Times criticized the episode for making jokes at the expense of starving African children.

"Starvin' Marvin" was released, along with eleven other episodes, in a three-VHS set in November 1998. It was included in the third volume, which also included the episodes "Mecha-Streisand", "Mr. Hankey, the Christmas Poo" and "Tom's Rhinoplasty". "Starvin' Marvin" was also one of six episodes included on a 1998 VHS called "South Park Festival Special", which included "Mr. Hankey, the Christmas Poo", "Merry Christmas, Charlie Manson!", "Mr. Hankey's Christmas Classics", "Korn's Groovy Pirate Ghost Mystery" and "Pinkeye". The episode, along with the other twelve from the first season, was also included in the DVD release "South Park: The Complete First Season", which was released on November 12, 2002. Parker and Stone recorded commentary tracks for each episode, but they were not included with the DVDs due to "standards" issues with some of the statements; Parker and Stone refused to allow the tracks to be edited and censored, so they were released in a CD separate from the DVDs. In 2008, Parker and Stone made "Starvin' Marvin" and all South Park episodes available to watch for free on the show's official website, "South Park Studios".
