= South Park season 3 =

Season of television series

South Park
- Season 3
- Home media release cover
- No. of episodes: 17

Release
- Original network: Comedy Central
- Original release: April 7, 1999 – January 12, 2000

Season chronology
- ← Previous; Season 2 Next → Season 4

The third season of South Park, an American animated television comedy series, aired on Comedy Central from April 7, 1999, to January 12, 2000. The season was headed by series creators Trey Parker and Matt Stone, who also served as executive producers along with Anne Garefino. The season continued to focus on the exploits of protagonists Stan, Kyle, Cartman, and Kenny in the fictional Colorado mountain town of South Park.

The season consisted of seventeen 22-minute episodes, which aired mostly in two groups separated by a three-month gap. Continuing their practice from previous seasons, Parker and Stone wrote and produced each episode within the week before its broadcast date. They produced the first half of the season simultaneously while working on the show's film adaptation, South Park: Bigger, Longer & Uncut. The show's creators considered the third season an improvement on the previous season, due to a heavier focus on strong storytelling structure and character development, as well as increased creative control. In the second half of the season, the show was dealt a heavy blow with the death of voice actress Mary Kay Bergman, who provided many of the female voices on the show. The remaining three episodes in the season are mostly absent of female voices for this reason.

The third season satirized such topics as the Waco siege, tropical rainforest conservation, and sexual harassment, films such as Star Wars: Episode I – The Phantom Menace, Tron, and Gettysburg, and television shows such as Scooby-Doo and Pokémon. It also continues the show's tradition of lampooning celebrities, which in this season include Cher, Pat Robertson, and Rod Stewart. The season features a guest appearance from both the nu metal band Korn and Friends actress Jennifer Aniston.

== Voice cast ==
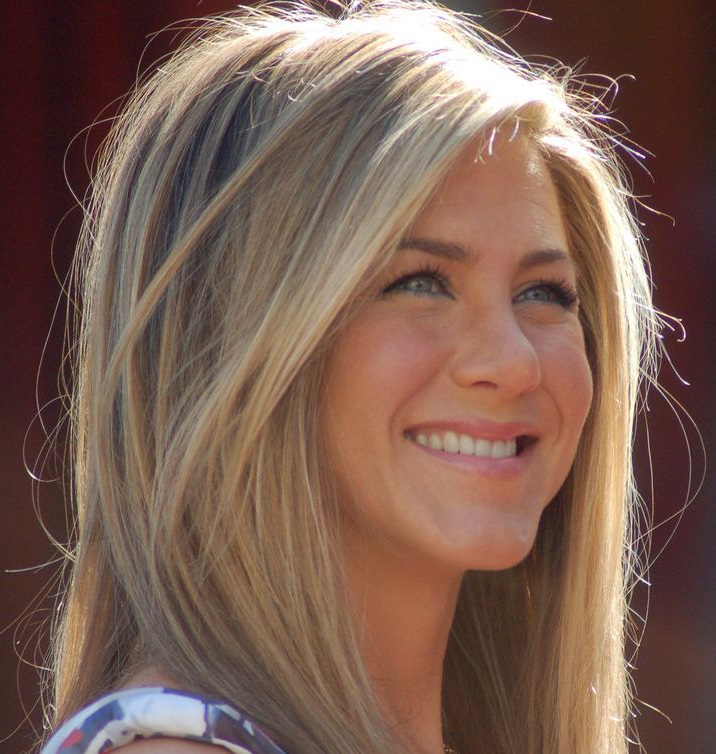
Jennifer Aniston, (pictured in 2012), made a guest appearance in "Rainforest Shmainforest".

This is the final season to feature Mary Kay Bergman as a series regular, who provided many of the female voices on the show. Bergman died by suicide on November 11, 1999. The remaining three episodes in the season are mostly absent of female voices for this reason.

=== Main cast ===
- Trey Parker as Stan Marsh, Eric Cartman, Randy Marsh, Mr. Garrison, Clyde Donovan, Mr. Hankey, Mr. Mackey, Token Black, and Phillip
- Matt Stone as Kyle Broflovski, Kenny McCormick, Butters Stotch, Gerald Broflovski, Stuart McCormick, Pip Pirrup, Craig Tucker, Jimbo Kern, Terrance, Tweek Tweak and Jesus
- Mary Kay Bergman (Episodes 1–15) as Liane Cartman, Sheila Broflovski, Shelly Marsh, Sharon Marsh, Carol McCormick and Wendy Testaburger
- Eliza Schneider (Episodes 16–17) as Sharon Marsh, Ms. Crabtree & Various
- Isaac Hayes as Chef

=== Guest cast ===
- Jennifer Aniston as Miss Stevens ("Rainforest Shmainforest")
- Jonathan Davis, James Shaffer, Brian Welch, Reginald Arvizu and David Silveria as themselves ("Korn's Groovy Pirate Ghost Mystery")

== Background ==
=== Development ===
After the second season of South Park, show creators Trey Parker and Matt Stone began to take more creative control of the show back, which they had delegated in the previous season to a writing staff. Parker and Stone have openly expressed dislike for the second season as a whole. "There's a lot of funny stuff in the second season," Stone remarked, but Parker agreed that they were still learning how to write for the show. They took the advice of friends in the television industry and let other writers on the staff write scripts and take more control of the show, which they later regretted. They even considered developing a show for broadcast television and leaving South Park, but they decided to continue working on it. On the DVD commentaries for the third season, Parker advised viewers to "throw away your season two DVDs. I don't like those shows." Parker would later say the same about the third season: "If I had to permanently erase anything from the library, it would basically be anything before season 4. It's just embarrassing to watch. Okay, we were, like, 26, 27. But it's like, 'Really? We thought that was funny? We thought that was well-written? Oh my God, this is terrible.'"

Like many South Park seasons, episodes were mostly produced in the week preceding their original broadcasts.

=== Writing ===
Parker characterized the third season as "where South Park turned the corner... and [became] good to us." The third season was produced simultaneously with the film adaptation of the series—South Park: Bigger, Longer & Uncut—and came at a time when the duo began learning more about story structure and character development. They applied these lessons to the show as well. Parker noted that producing the film and season at the same time was "tough." The show and film occupied two separate buildings a mile apart that the duo would often have to switch between. Paramount Pictures was unhappy with the duo working on the show equally with the film. "Jakovasaurs" arrived at a peak of post-production work on the film. Parker and Stone claim to have no memory of making "Sexual Harassment Panda", the following episode, due to their exhaustion from working on the film: "We don't remember doing these shows at all," Parker remarked in the episode's commentary. Stone characterized the episode as "delusionary writing."

With the film completed for its June 30, 1999, release date, the duo still were contracted to produce three more episodes before taking a break. They came up with the idea to produce a trilogy of episodes—"Cat Orgy", "Two Guys Naked in a Hot Tub", and "Jewbilee"—which they called "the meteor shower trilogy." They felt "brain-dead" on ideas and created the idea to make things easier. "Two Guys Naked in a Hot Tub" features the first major appearance of Butters Stotch, who became a main character in the series in later seasons; prior to this episode, he was a nameless background character, having had a non-speaking background role in "Cartman Gets an Anal Probe". They based Butters on the show's animation director, Eric Stough, whom they mocked while working on the film. "Jewbilee", the trilogy's conclusion, became regarded as one of the duo's favorite all-time episodes. "We were literally crawling around the floor trying to finish the show but we were also all already on vacation in our minds," Parker remembered. To this end, they decided not to care about the episode's content and just make whatever came to mind. Following the episode's completion, the staff took a vacation for a month, returning later in the year to complete the rest of the season.

Their first episode back, in October 1999, was "Korn's Groovy Pirate Ghost Mystery". Parker remembered the making of the episode difficult, as they had been away for so long. "Chinpokomon" features the guest voice of Parker's old college friend Junichi Nishimura, and several elements of the script—namely, the Japanese having "small penises"—were inspired by a trip to Beijing with Nishimura. In the trip, Nishimura's boss kept referring to the size of his own penis as "so small", which became a joke in the episode. "Hooked on Monkey Fonics" was based on a friend of Parker and Stone's, who homeschooled his child. To Stone, the episode distilled down the essence of South Park: that children are not innocent, but rather "little bastards." "Starvin' Marvin in Space" was produced around Thanksgiving 1999, and the duo decided to write a sequel to the season one episode "Starvin' Marvin". The duo thought of it as not a regular episode of South Park, but something wholly its own.

After completing the dialogue for the aforementioned episode, Mary Kay Bergman, the voice actress behind many of the female characters on South Park, was found dead of suicide. Parker and Stone, shocked by the news, made the remaining episodes in the third season revolve around mainly male characters, beginning with "The Red Badge of Gayness". "Mr. Hankey's Christmas Classics" is mostly an animated music video, of sorts, to the album of the same name which was released one week prior. Parker and Stone had spent several weeks with composer Marc Shaiman, whom they had worked with on Bigger, Longer & Uncut, to create an entire album of South Park-themed holiday songs. "Are You There God? It's Me, Jesus" was made at the request of the network to produce an episode centering on the New Millennium. "World Wide Recorder Concert" fulfilled their contractual obligations with the network, and required the team to come back after the Christmas break to complete it.

=== Cultural references ===
The central character in "Jakovasaurs" is based on Jar Jar Binks from Star Wars: Episode I – The Phantom Menace (1999). Plot elements of "Two Guys Naked in a Hot Tub" were inspired by a HBO documentary on the Waco siege, perhaps Waco: The Rules of Engagement; Parker and Stone regarded the incident as a "disaster". They parody the pop star Cher and her song "Believe" for the episode, used for tortuous purposes. The parody was performed by staff writer Pam Brady. In "Jewbilee", the Moses character is patterned after the Master Control Program from the film Tron. The nu metal band Korn guest star in the episode "Korn's Groovy Pirate Ghost Mystery". Korn approached the show's staff with the idea to premiere their new single, "Falling Away from Me", on South Park. Parker and Stone were at first unreceptive to the offer, but became more excited when the idea came to portray them in a cheesy fashion, like the appearances of the Harlem Globetrotters in The New Scooby-Doo Movies. The animators attempted to model the animation after Hanna-Barbera's style.

"Chinpokomon" satirizes the phenomenon of the Pokémon franchise, which at the time was at its peak of popularity. To prepare, the show's writing staff sat down and watched episodes of the Pokémon anime, which they regarded as nothing more than marketing to buy trading cards. "Starvin' Marvin in Space" mocks media mogul and minister Pat Robertson and his program, The 700 Club. "The Red Badge of Gayness" references American Civil War reenactments and parodies the film Gettysburg. "Mr. Hankey's Christmas Classics" features an obscure reference to a bootleg tape of the one broadcast of the Star Wars Holiday Special, in which a news reporter, teasing the late-night news, remarks, "Fighting the frizzies, at eleven." Parker called it "one of the most obscure things we've ever done in South Park. "Are You There God? It's Me, Jesus" mocks the musician Rod Stewart and the Backstreet Boys, and its title references the book Are You There God? It's Me, Margaret.

== Episodes ==
No. overall	No. in season	Title	Directed by	Written by	Original release date	Prod. code	U.S. viewers (millions)
32	1	"Rainforest Shmainforest"	Trey Parker & Eric Stough	Trey Parker & Matt Stone	April 7, 1999	301	3.41 2.32 (HH) (Note: (HH) denotes that the numbers listed are the amount of households the episode was viewed in.)
The boys are forced to join a choir sent to Costa Rica to perform against deforestation as punishment for their rude behavior. Still, they end up lost in the rainforest and discover that it isn't worth saving. Meanwhile, Kenny falls for a girl in the chorus, but she is reluctant to pursue a long-distance relationship.
33	2	"Spontaneous Combustion"	Matt Stone	Trey Parker, Matt Stone & David Goodman	April 14, 1999	302	3.28 2.29 (HH)
Randy must find out why the citizens of South Park are suddenly spontaneously combusting. Meanwhile, Cartman plays Jesus in a "Stations of the Cross" play and ends up stuck on the cross.
34	3	"Succubus"	Trey Parker	Trey Parker	April 21, 1999	303	2.55 1.89 (HH)
When Chef gets engaged to a strange woman, the boys are convinced that Chef's fiancée is a demon bent on sucking the life out of men. Meanwhile, Cartman becomes the butt of several pranks by his eye doctor.
35	4	"Jakovasaurs"	Matt Stone	Trey Parker, Matt Stone & David Goodman	June 16, 1999	305	2.92 2.07 (HH)
The town saves a species from extinction, but finds that they are an extremely annoying race that only Cartman can stand.
36	5	"Tweek vs. Craig"	Trey Parker	Trey Parker	June 23, 1999	304	2.81 1.87 (HH)
Stan, Kyle, Cartman, and Kenny pit Tweek and Craig against each other. Meanwhile, the school shop teacher, Mr. Adler, copes with the loss of his wife, who died in a plane crash.
37	6	"Sexual Harassment Panda"	Eric Stough	Trey Parker	July 7, 1999	306	2.86 1.83 (HH)
A man in a panda costume is hired to teach the kids about sexual harassment, leading Cartman to sue Stan (and all the kids to sue the school) over claims of being harassed.
38	7	"Cat Orgy"	Trey Parker	Trey Parker	July 14, 1999	307	2.98
Cartman is stuck at home with Stan's sadistic sister, Shelley, as his babysitter while his mom is at a meteor shower party. Meanwhile, Cartman's cat, Mr. Kitty, is in heat and goes searching for sex with other cats.
39	8	"Two Guys Naked in a Hot Tub"	Trey Parker	Trey Parker, Matt Stone & David Goodman	July 21, 1999	308	2.97 2.03 (HH)
At the meteor shower party mentioned in the previous episode, Stan is stuck in a basement with Pip, Butters and Dougie from school who become important to him when the ATF stakes out the party, thinking that the attendees will commit suicide when the meteor comes. Meanwhile, Randy feels uncomfortable after he and Gerald watch each other masturbate in a hot tub.
40	9	"Jewbilee"	Trey Parker	Trey Parker	July 28, 1999	309	2.85 1.93 (HH)
On the night of the aforementioned meteor shower, Kyle, Kenny, and Ike go to a Jewish scout camp where Moses appears.
41	10	"Korn's Groovy Pirate Ghost Mystery"	Trey Parker	Trey Parker	October 27, 1999	312	3.97 2.50 (HH)
Nu metal band Korn guest stars in this episode, where they are blamed for making Halloween immoral, and the boys use Kyle's grandmother's corpse to scare the sixth graders.
42	11	"Chinpokomon" "Chinpoko Mon"	Eric Stough & Trey Parker	Trey Parker	November 3, 1999	310	3.51 2.36 (HH)
The boys become fascinated with the latest fad from Japan, which turns out to be an insidious plot to have American children brainwashed into overthrowing the U.S. government.
43	12	"Hooked on Monkey Fonics"	Trey Parker	Trey Parker	November 10, 1999	313	3.04 2.05 (HH)
A homeschooled boy decides to start at public school, much to his overprotective parents' fear. Meanwhile, Kyle falls for the boy's sister.
44	13	"Starvin' Marvin in Space"	Trey Parker	Trey Parker, Matt Stone & Kyle McCulloch	November 17, 1999	311	2.99
The boys must save Starvin' Marvin from the government and a Christian group who cares more about converting people from third-world countries than giving them food and shelter.
45	14	"The Red Badge of Gayness" "Red Badge of Gayness"	Trey Parker	Trey Parker	November 24, 1999	314	2.96 1.94 (HH)
During a Civil War reenactment, Cartman (as General Lee) leads the Drunk Confederate army to attack the Union soldiers across America.
46	15	"Mr. Hankey's Christmas Classics"	Trey Parker	Trey Parker	December 1, 1999	315	2.79
Mr. Hankey hosts a Christmas musical, featuring South Park characters singing twisted renditions of classic Christmas songs and a memorial piece to voice actress Mary Kay Bergman.
47	16	"Are You There God? It's Me, Jesus"	Eric Stough	Trey Parker	December 29, 1999	316	2.13
Cartman and Kenny mistake a colon infection for their menstrual cycle, prompting Kyle to lie about "getting his period" and Stan to ingest hormone pills so he will not feel left out. Meanwhile, Jesus plans a New Year's party and is worried his father will not be there. Note: This is the last episode to air in the 1990s.
48	17	"World Wide Recorder Concert" "The Brown Noise"	Eric Stough	Trey Parker	January 12, 2000	317	2.57
The boys travel to Arkansas to perform at a recorder concert. Meanwhile, Mr. Garrison confronts his father about not being sexually molested as a child. Note: This is the first episode to air in the 2000s.

== See also ==
- South Park (Park County, Colorado)
- South Park City
