= Two Guys Naked in a Hot Tub =

- South Park episode
- Episode no.: Season 3 Episode 8
- Directed by: Trey Parker
- Written by: Trey Parker; Matt Stone; David Goodman
- Production code: 308
- Original air date: July 21, 1999

Episode chronology
← Previous "Cat Orgy"	Next → "Jewbilee"
- South Park season 3

"Two Guys Naked in a Hot Tub" (also known as "Melvins") is the eighth episode of the third season of the American animated television series South Park, and the 39th episode of the series overall. The episode is the second part of The Meteor Shower Trilogy, and centers upon third grader Stan Marsh and his father Randy. It premiered on Comedy Central on July 21, 1999.

The episode was written by series creators Trey Parker and Matt Stone, and David Goodman. It is noted for being the first episode in which Butters Stotch serves as an important supporting character, with substantial dialogue. "Two Guys Naked in a Hot Tub" pokes fun at two notable cult-related incidents in the US from the 1990s: the 1993 Waco siege and the 1997 Heaven's Gate mass suicide.

== Plot ==
After dropping Shelly off at Cartman's home, the Marshes and Stan are off to a party at the home of Mr. Mackey. Stan is upset that he has to go and becomes even more angered when he is locked in a room with nerdy "Melvin" classmates that he does not like: Pip, Butters, and Dougie. After finding a box of women's clothing, the three insist on playing Charlie's Angels, and an unenthusiastic Stan uses the game to find a way out of the basement to an upstairs bedroom where there are cookies and TV. Meanwhile, at the party, Mr. Mackey gives the Broflovskis and Marshes a tour of his home and leads them out to the hot tub. The wives leave Randy and Gerald outside in the hot tub, and the men declare the present evening to be a night of experimenting. The two talk about threesomes and decide to masturbate in front of one another. This leads to awkwardness after Randy questions his sexuality.

The ATF thinks that the party inside is a suicide cult, and that they plan to kill themselves at the start of the meteor shower. Determined to prevent this, they set up a blockade and prepare to open fire on the cult if they do not desist; at one point, a couple of party-goers leave and are immediately fatally shot (due to the ATF believing they had weapons despite them clearly not having any). The Newsman recalls that the last time the ATF did this was at the Waco siege, where their aggressive tactics resulted in the deaths of many innocent people, but the ATF dismisses him. All the while, the party-goers (who progressively become drunk) inside are unaware of their presence. Stan and the kids discover what is happening and try to speak to the ATF, but are shot at and forced to flee back inside. The kids record a video tape showing that the party inside is not a cult to the Newsman; the ATF realizes their mistake, claiming it was a "test simulation" and quickly disperse after their secret weapon, a large rocket called "The Negotiator", fires and destroys every home in the neighborhood except for Mackey's.

Inside, Randy is extremely uncomfortable being around Gerald, who is concerned about Randy's behavior. When Randy finally admits to the entire party that he and Gerald engaged in group masturbation, he is relieved upon discovering that he is not the only one to have masturbated in front of a person of the same sex. Outside, the boys rejoice their triumph of saving the day and Stan realizes that the others are just normal kids like him. All is immediately forgotten, however, when Kyle returns from Jewbilee camp and Stan goes back to his old ways, telling Kyle that he had to "spend the evening with these friggin' Melvins".

The credits roll with a parody version of Cher's "Believe" (which the ATF used to drown out the party-goers in an effort for them to submit, unaware that Mackey was playing the same song and which everyone enjoyed).

== Production ==
Parker and Stone based much of the plot, including the ATF's use of Cher, on the Waco siege after watching the documentary Waco: The Rules of Engagement. Pam Brady provided the voice for Cher.
