= Chinpokomon =

- South Park episode
- The kids in class smile with anime-like expressions and then start speaking Japanese
- Episode no.: Season 3 Episode 11
- Directed by: Trey Parker; Eric Stough
- Written by: Trey Parker
- Production code: 310
- Original air date: November 3, 1999

Episode chronology
← Previous "Korn's Groovy Pirate Ghost Mystery"	Next → "Hooked on Monkey Fonics"
- South Park season 3

"Chinpokomon" is the eleventh-aired and the tenth-produced episode of the third season of the American animated television series South Park. It originally aired on Comedy Central in the United States on November 3, 1999, making it the 42nd episode of the series. During this episode, the kids become fascinated with the latest fad: a fictional Japanese anime series called Chinpokomon and its related products, such as video games and collectible toys. It is a parody of the popular Pokémon media franchise. "Chinpokomon" was written by South Park co-creator Trey Parker, who also co-directed the episode with animation director Eric Stough. The episode was nominated for an Emmy Award in 2000.

== Plot ==
The children of South Park become obsessed with a Japanese anime series, Chinpokomon (a parody of Pokémon). The cartoon features overt embedded marketing and subliminal messaging to encourage the purchase and consumption of Chinpokomon-related merchandise. Unbeknownst to the parents, Chinpokomon products all contain anti-American sentiments with the aim of converting American kids to Japanese child soldiers.

Kyle Broflovski is originally oblivious to the fad, and as its popularity increases he reluctantly attempts to keep up-to-date to avoid ridicule from his friends. However, the merchandise lineup is so extensive that he is always one step behind. Meanwhile, the boys make plans to attend the official Chinpokomon camp, which is actually a front for a recruit training boot camp designed by the Japanese government to train and brainwash the kids into becoming soldiers for an upcoming attack on Pearl Harbor. As the adults start to become aware of the scheme, the Japanese distract them by telling them that Americans have "huge penises" compared to the Japanese, a tactic that works well against the male characters.

The parents start to suspect the nonsensical cartoon is dangerous, as "stupidity can be worse than vulgarity and violence" and compare it to Battle of the Network Stars. Kyle's mother Sheila suggests it is just another harmless fad. This is juxtaposed with the truth of the fad's influence, which has turned the children into brainwashed soldiers and left Kenny McCormick in a trance-like state after an epileptic seizure caused by playing the Chinpokomon video game.

Becoming increasingly concerned, the parents attempt to defuse the fad's popularity by trying to manufacture new fads: The "Wild Wacky Action Bike", an abnormal plastic glow-in-the-dark bicycle contraption that cannot be steered, and "Alabama Man", an abusive, alcoholic, redneck action figure that comes with a bowling alley playset and a redneck wife to use as a punching bag. The boys, uninterested, call both the bike and action figure "gay".

As the boys march through the town with 'Emperor Hirohito', President Bill Clinton will not act against the invasion as he too has fallen for the "incredibly large penis" trick. Finally, the parents decide to use reverse psychology and pretend to be Chinpokomon fans themselves, figuring that whatever they like, their children will immediately dislike. The trick works, and all the children except Kyle instantly lose all interest. Kyle claims that if he stops liking Chinpokomon now, he will be following the crowd, so he prepares to leave in a fighter jet to bomb Pearl Harbor. A heartfelt and contradictory speech by Stan Marsh confuses him into reluctantly getting off the jet.

The group decides to avoid fads for a while, and Kenny is discovered to have been dead for some time once his body explodes, unleashing a large number of rats. This outcome disgusts Eric Cartman while Stan and Kyle laugh.

== Production ==
The chinpo or chinpoko element in Chinpokomon is a crude Japanese slang word for "penis". According to the DVD commentary, the Japanese man who repeats the "incredibly large penis" trick is based on someone the creators met in Beijing. South Park animator Junichi Nishimura, whom Stone met in college, voices the Emperor in this episode. Saki Miata portrays the Japanese woman in the in-universe commercial.

In a 2016 interview, when asked if the series would mock the Pokémon Go craze, Parker responded, "we did, in 1999."

== Critical reception ==
DVD Verdict described it as "perhaps the most devastating parody of the seemingly endless pop culture craziness of forced Japan fads", noting its jokes about the quality of Pokémon games, toys and anime. ElderGeek described the episode as "a very ironic take on children’s trends and how debilitating they can be". Adam Crane of PixelatedPop ranked the episode 23rd in a top 25 greatest episodes list in 2012. ScreenJunkies wrote "The blindness of parents, the zombie-like children following a fad, and the irrational paranoia of Americans who fear the Japanese simply because they make the occasional incomprehensible TV show were all parodied to perfection". IGN said "'Chinpokomon' was a great rip on the whole Pokemon craze with a lot of crude jokes about Asian male anatomy".

The A.V. Club noted that this episode was South Park's first "fad episode", in which characters become obsessed with a recent trend and suffer consequences, before changing their minds and dropping it.
