= Cat Orgy =

- South Park episode
- Episode no.: Season 3 Episode 7
- Directed by: Trey Parker
- Written by: Trey Parker
- Production code: 307
- Original air date: July 14, 1999

Episode chronology
← Previous "Sexual Harassment Panda"	Next → "Two Guys Naked in a Hot Tub"
- South Park season 3

"Cat Orgy" is the seventh episode of the third season of the American animated sitcom South Park, and the 38th episode of the series overall. It originally aired on Comedy Central on July 14, 1999. It is the first episode of a three-part story arc, often known as "The Meteor Shower Trilogy", which tells three different stories all taking place on the same night. The other two episodes are "Two Guys Naked in a Hot Tub" and "Jewbilee". As such, it features only one of the four main characters, Eric Cartman.

== Plot ==
On the night of a meteor shower, Liane goes to Mr. Mackey's party, leaving Cartman to be babysat by Stan's 12-year-old sister, Shelley, who is an aggressive bully. While babysitting, she invites her 22-year-old boyfriend, Skyler, over, who in turn invites the rest of his rock band to rehearse (despite Liane specifically telling her not to have anyone over). Cartman is in his room, playing Wild Wild West and dressed up as Will Smith's version of Jim West from Wild Wild West, but becomes upset with Shelley babysitting him and the boys practising (especially when the former gives him wedgies). Meanwhile, Mr. Kitty is in heat, much to Cartman's annoyance. Later, Skyler's bandmates leave in disgust after performing a song made by Shelley. In an effort to get her back, Cartman takes a picture of Shelley and Skyler about to kiss and tries to send it to his mother via Kitty, but Shelley finds the picture with the cat and removes it.

Kitty decides to go out in search of a tom. After an unsuccessful attempt with an overweight tom, she winds up seducing a large group of cats, and invites them back to Cartman's house and cracks open catnip. Eric tries to tell his mother that Shelley is breaking Liane's rule about having boys over, but she does not believe that Shelley would do such a thing. Back at home, during the meteor shower, Skyler gets mad at Shelley because she will not "put out" because she is 12 years old. Cartman has taped everything and is about to get Shelley in trouble, but instead comes to pity her when Skyler, angry that Shelley will not "put out" for him, breaks up with her and leaves her crying hysterically.

Cartman and Shelley decide to team up for revenge, and sneak into the woods near where Skyler lives. Cartman manages to entice Skyler out of his house with a taping of his Salma Hayek impersonation while Shelley sneaks in and destroys his prized guitar. They return home to find Kitty and many other cats engaged in a massive feline orgy. Skyler shows up, furious, but Cartman throws a box of catnip at Skyler, which attracts the clowder of cats, who attack and rape him. Ms. Cartman returns home. Shelley and Cartman blame the mess on each other, but Liane, being inebriated, passes out without noticing the mess. Shelley, amazed that they got out of the situation unscathed, celebrates by dancing with Eric as he sings his version of the Wild, Wild West song.

== Cultural references ==
When Cartman takes the picture of Shelly and Skyler kissing, he exclaims "Ha ha! Charade you are!" which is the refrain of the Pink Floyd song "Pigs (Three Different Ones).”

Cartman parodies the Newt character from the film Aliens several times, with a play on her original line of "They mostly come at night....mostly" (referring to the alien).

Throughout the episode, while playing with his toys, Cartman makes allusions to the 1999 film Wild Wild West. Coincidentally, this film was released on the same day as South Park: Bigger, Longer & Uncut, two weeks before the original broadcast of this episode. The makers of South Park were disappointed that it performed better at the box office than their film despite being critically panned; and some underage moviegoers snuck into the R-rated South Park film after having bought tickets to the PG-13-rated Wild Wild West.
