= Mr. Hankey's Christmas Classics =

- South Park episode
- Episode no.: Season 3 Episode 15
- Directed by: Trey Parker
- Written by: Trey Parker
- Production code: 315
- Original air date: December 1, 1999

Episode chronology
← Previous "The Red Badge of Gayness"	Next → "Are You There God? It's Me, Jesus"
- South Park season 3

"Mr. Hankey's Christmas Classics" is the fifteenth episode of the third season of the animated television series South Park and the 46th episode of the series overall. An album of the same name consisting of versions of songs from the show as well as a number of additional songs was released the week prior to the episode's original air date, December 1, 1999.

== Plot ==
The episode is styled as a variety show and features Mr. Hankey as the host; he sits by the fire in his sewer home and introduces shorts featuring unusual holiday songs. In a similar fashion to "Starvin' Marvin in Space", the episode was dedicated to Mary Kay Bergman, the original voice of most of the female characters on the show up to that point, who had died by suicide less than a month earlier. Since the episode features audio from the Christmas Classics album, which had been recorded months earlier, it marks the final episode in which Bergman's voice is heard. During the performance of Have Yourself a Merry Little Christmas, a brief montage of several of Bergman's characters - the boy's moms, Wendy, Shelly, Principal Victoria, Mayor McDaniels, Nurse Gollum, and Ms. Crabtree - are shown and some gather within Mr. Hankey's home afterwards to sing.

During "The Dreidel Song", Gerald Broflovski sings of his admiration for Courteney Cox, who is according to him, 'hot' on 'that show'.

During the "Christmas Time in Hell" song, Satan is singing along with various celebrities in Hell, including Jeffrey Dahmer, John F. Kennedy, John F. Kennedy Jr., Diana, Princess of Wales, Gene Siskel, Mao Zedong, Adolf Hitler, Genghis Khan, Michael Landon and Jimmy Stewart. A framed picture of comedian Andy Dick is also seen during the dance number.

=== Songs/scenes ===
1. "Mr. Hankey, The Christmas Poo", performed by a postman (a reference to Fred Astaire's character in Santa Claus Is Comin' to Town), Mr. Hankey and the students of South Park Elementary (students voiced by the voice actors of Ike Broflovski)
2. "Dreidel, Dreidel, Dreidel (The Dreidel Song)", performed by Kyle Broflovski, with Eric Cartman, Stan Marsh, and Gerald, Sheila and Ike Broflovski
3. "O Tannenbaum", performed by Adolf Hitler
4. "Christmas Time In Hell", performed by Satan and the damned
5. "Carol of the Bells", performed by Mr. Mackey
6. "O Holy Night", incorrectly performed by Eric Cartman
7. "Merry Fucking Christmas", performed by Mr. Garrison
8. "I Saw Three Ships", performed by Shelley Marsh
9. A Christmas medley performed by Jesus and Santa Claus as lounge singers, featuring: "Joy to the World", "Up On the House Top", "Away in a Manger", "O Come All Ye Faithful", "Hark! The Herald Angels Sing", "Silent Night", "Rio", and "Let it Snow"
10. "Have Yourself a Merry Little Christmas", performed by Mr. Hankey and the cast. During the scene, Kenny is killed when a chandelier falls on him.
11. During the ending credits a reprise of "Dreidel Dreidel Dreidel" plays.

=== "Fighting the frizzies, at eleven." ===
After every commercial break, a live action segment featuring a news anchor is shown, saying "Fighting the frizzies, at eleven." In the DVD commentary, Stone and Parker indicate this is a reference to a bootleg tape of Star Wars Holiday Special. The original tape featured a brief clip at the end from WCBS-TV featuring newscaster Rolland Smith informing viewers, "Fighting the frizzies, at eleven." However, while the original news ad was apparently referring to "frizzy" hair, the ending credits of this episode of South Park feature the news anchor boxing a man in a giant fuzzy suit. The announcements were followed by Hankey's show's logo, which is based on that of Star Wars.

== Reception ==
In September 2008, Russian prosecutors filed a motion to ban the series based on complaints received about this episode. The TV station was allowed to keep its license by agreeing not to re-air the program.

== Album ==
South Park: Mr. Hankey's Christmas Classics

Soundtrack album by Trey Parker, Matt Stone and South Park
- Released: November 23, 1999
- Genre: Comedy
- Length: 36:34
- Label: Columbia; American Recordings
- Producers: Rick Rubin (exec.); Marc Shaiman, Matt Stone, Trey Parker

South Park chronology
South Park: Bigger, Longer & Uncut (1999)	South Park: Mr. Hankey's Christmas Classics (1999)

The album features more songs than the show. Additionally, some of those featured in the show are slightly different than the aired versions. The album reached #33 on Billboard's 1999 Christmas albums. The duet between Santa and Jesus that appears in the episode was meant for the album, but music rights for Duran Duran's "Rio" could not be cleared for the album in time.

No.	Title	Writer(s)	Performed by	Length
1.	"Mr. Hankey, The Christmas Poo"	Trey Parker, Marc Shaiman	Cowboy Timmy and Mr. Hankey	2:16
2.	"Merry Fucking Christmas"	Parker	Mr. Garrison	2:04
3.	"O Holy Night"	(Traditional)	Eric Cartman	1:57
4.	"Dead, Dead, Dead"	Parker	Juan Schwartz and the South Park Children's Choir	2:13
5.	"Carol of the Bells"	Mykola Lysenko, Peter Wilhousky	Mr. Mackey	0:57
6.	"The Lonely Jew on Christmas"	Parker, Shaiman	Kyle Broflovski with special celebrity guest	2:46
7.	"I Saw Three Ships"	(Traditional)	Shelley Marsh	1:02
8.	"It Happened in Sun Valley"	Harry Warren, Mack Gordon	Stan Marsh and Wendy Testaburger	2:21
9.	"O Tannenbaum"	(Traditional)	Adolf Hitler	1:10
10.	"Christmas Time in Hell"	Parker, Shaiman	Satan, The Dark Prince	2:15
11.	"What the Hell Child is This?"	(Traditional, adapted by Shaiman)	Chef	4:28
12.	"Santa Claus is on His Way"	Parker	Mr. Hankey	0:28
13.	"Swiss Colony Beef Log"	Parker, David Goodman	Cartman	2:16
14.	"Hark the Herald Angels Sing"	(Traditional)	The South Park Children's Choir	0:40
15.	"Dreidel, Dreidel, Dreidel"	(Traditional, adapted by Shaiman)	The Broflovskis with Eric Cartman and Stan Marsh	3:20
16.	"The Most Offensive Song Ever"	Parker, Shaiman	Kenny McCormick and Mr. Hankey	3:00
17.	"We Three Kings"	(Traditional)	Mr. Ose	0:51
18.	"Have Yourself a Merry Little Christmas"	Hugh Martin, Ralph Blane	Mr. Hankey with Stan, Kyle and Cartman	2:30

=== Personnel ===
Credits are adapted from the album's liner notes.

==== Voices ====
- Trey Parker – Stan Marsh, Eric Cartman, Mr. Hankey, Cowboy Timmy, Mr. Garrison, Juan Schwartz, Mr. Mackey, Adolf Hitler, Satan, Mr. Ose, "special celebrity guest"
- Matt Stone – Kyle Broflovski, Kenny McCormick, Gerald Broflovski
- Mary Kay Bergman (posthumous role) – Shelley Marsh, Wendy Testaburger, Sheila Broflovski
- Isaac Hayes – Chef

==== Personnel ====
- Trey Parker – electric and acoustic guitars
- Matt Stone – bass guitars, drums and percussion
- Marc Shaiman – piano and keyboards, arrangements and orchestrations
- Harvey Cohen, Mervyn Warren and Frank Bennett – orchestrations
- Bruce Howell – guitars on "The Lonely Jew on Christmas" and "What the Hell Child Is This?"
- Neil Stubenhaus – bass guitars on "The Lonely Jew on Christmas" and "What the Hell Child Is This?"
- John Robinson – drums on "The Lonely Jew on Christmas" and "What the Hell Child Is This?"
- Dan Higgins – saxophone on "What the Hell Child Is This?"

==== Production ====
- Trey Parker, Matt Stone and Marc Shaiman – production and performance
- Bruce Howell – production on "Santa Claus Is on His Way" and "Hark! The Herald Angels Sing"
- Nick Vidar – recording
- Joe Atlas – photography
- Monster X – design

=== Singles ===
- "Mr. Hankey, The Christmas Poo" UK no. 4

CD1

1. "Mr. Hankey, The Christmas Poo" – Performed by Cowboy Timmy
2. "Cheesy Poofs (Theme)" – Performed by Eric Cartman
3. "Chocolate Salty Balls" (Karaoke Version) – Performed by Chef

CD2

1. "Mr. Hankey, The Christmas Poo" – Performed by Cowboy Timmy
2. "My Best Friends" (Snippet) – Performed by Eric Cartman
3. "Swiss Colony Beef Log" – Performed by Eric Cartman
