= Hooked on Monkey Fonics =

- South Park episode
- Episode no.: Season 3 Episode 12
- Directed by: Trey Parker
- Written by: Trey Parker
- Production code: 313
- Original air date: November 10, 1999

Episode chronology
← Previous "Chinpokomon"	Next → "Starvin' Marvin in Space"

"Hooked on Monkey Fonics" is the twelfth-aired and the thirteenth-produced episode of the third season of the animated television series South Park and the 43rd episode of the series overall. It originally aired on November 10, 1999. It features issues of homeschooling and phonics, a method of teaching children to read. This is the final episode of South Park to air prior to the death of Mary Kay Bergman, who died by suicide the day after the episode aired. The final episode to use her dialogue was "Starvin' Marvin in Space" which ended production shortly before her death.

== Plot ==
In preparation for a spelling bee, Cartman's mother buys him a "Hooked on Monkey Fonics" system that features an actual live monkey playing the drums to keep with the beat of spelling and sounding out the words. After spelling a couple of words, Cartman believes he will have a chance to win the spelling bee. While at the spelling bee, the children face stiff competition from two homeschooled children, Rebecca and Mark Cotswolds. Cartman asks the monkey to help him spell his word, chair, but Fonics Monkey is masturbating, and Cartman misspells it as "C-H-A-R-E"; angered, he runs off to chase the monkey. In the final round, Kyle is unable to spell his word, "kroxldyphivc" (a non-existent word made up for the episode) correctly, and Rebecca and Mark are declared the champions. Although Kyle is annoyed at having been beaten, he ends up developing a crush on Rebecca.

Mark becomes intrigued by the interactions he sees between Cartman, Kyle, and Stan, and begs his father to be allowed to attend public school. His father objects due to how dangerous public schools can be, but reluctantly relents. At the school, Mark, placed in a largely protective hamster ball by his overprotective and agoraphobic father, is tormented for his haughty attitude and superior knowledge, and ends up duct taped to a bench by the other boys. This prompts Mark's father to speak with the adults in Skeeter's Bar and Cocktails about the incident and the fact that Kyle has become smitten with Rebecca and should stop pursuing her. The adults are quick to dislike him as much as the kids dislike Mark; after learning that he does not drink beer but prefers wine coolers, they proceed to duct tape Mark's father to one of the bar's benches.

After questioning Mark about why he has never been seen before and why he does not attend school like the other children, Cartman is introduced to the concept of home schooling. The idea of never having to go to school appeals to him greatly, and, using Mr. Garrison's condescending remarks towards him as an excuse, demands to be home schooled himself. To him, this involves a regimen of sleeping in and sitting in bed while snacking and watching television, while his mother unsuccessfully attempts to get him to study. When Stan and Kenny come to visit to tell him about the Bay of Pigs Memorial Dance, Fonics Monkey kills Kenny.

Meanwhile, Kyle makes many efforts to make his feelings known to Rebecca, although several end up humorously unsuccessful. Ultimately he convinces her to explore the world of public schooling, and she agrees to go to the South Park dance with him. He also explains what love is to her and, out of curiosity, she asks Kyle if she can experiment a kiss with him, to which he agrees. After kissing him, Rebecca immediately changes when she agrees to Kyle's dance proposal ("You bet your sweet ass I'll go.")

At the dance, the band Dio plays their song "Holy Diver". The boys of the school hatch a plan to duct tape Mark to the flagpole while the adults also hatch a similar plan for Mark's father. When Rebecca enters the dance dressed up promiscuously and kissing every boy in sight, Mark is outraged and attacks Kyle for turning his sister "into a slut". The other boys perceive his beating up Kyle as cool and finally accept him; Randy Marsh breaks up the fight, with Mark warning Kyle he's not through with him. Mr. and Mrs. Cotswolds arrive and interrupt the dance, looking for their children so they could leave. Mark gets onstage and makes a speech to his parents (particularly to his father) about the benefits of public schools – "...it's the main place where children learn all of their social skills. You can't teach a child social skills. They have to learn them themselves." Mr. Cotswolds, affected by his son's speech, agrees to let Rebecca and Mark regularly attend public school; Rebecca and Kyle then share a kiss. Mark's father, however, is then duct taped to the flagpole in front of the school by the adults, regardless of his change in attitude and opinion. Dio restarts and plays "Holy Diver" over the end credits, with Fonics Monkey joining in on drums.

== Cultural references ==
The character of Rebecca is based on Rebecca Sealfon, who won the 1997 Scripps National Spelling Bee. She is one of the most well-known spelling bee winners, spelling her final word, "euonym," by screaming out each letter. She also displayed the odd habit of covering her mouth and whispering each letter before saying it, which was parodied in the episode as well.

Kyle's speech to Rebecca about love parodies the Star Trek episode "The Gamesters of Triskelion"; a musical cue often used in romantic scenes during The Original Series can also be heard during this scene. Kyle's love confession and kiss with Rebecca parodies a scene between Judah Ben-Hur and Esther in Ben-Hur.

== Reception ==
When band leader Ronnie James Dio was asked how he felt about South Park's parody of him, he said "I thought it was wonderful. I initially didn't want to let it be done because I felt that they were just going to crucify me [and] that I would end up being like what they did to Rod Stewart, and what they did to Elton John, and what they did to Ozzy. But they assured our office that they were real Dio fans and that I would like it. So I thought to myself "Well if you want to be an American icon, you better let them do it". And they did, and I was knocked out. It was funny. I thought they were more cruel to the drummer, if anything else."

In 2006, IGN listed the episode as #10 on their list of their 10 Favorite South Park Episodes.
