= World Wide Recorder Concert =

- South Park episode
- Episode no.: Season 3 Episode 17
- Directed by: Eric Stough
- Written by: Trey Parker
- Production code: 317
- Original air date: January 12, 2000

Episode chronology
← Previous "Are You There God? It's Me, Jesus"	Next → "The Tooth Fairy's Tats 2000"
- South Park season 3

"World Wide Recorder Concert" (also known as "The Brown Noise") is the seventeenth and final episode of the third season of the animated television series South Park and the 48th episode of the series overall. It was originally broadcast on January 12, 2000. In the episode, the boys feud with children from New York at a gathering of elementary school students for a recorder concert. Meanwhile, Mr. Garrison confronts his father who, he believes, had neglected him in childhood.

== Plot synopsis ==
Four million children, including those from Mr. Garrison's class, are scheduled to play "My Country, 'Tis of Thee" at the televised Worldwide Recorder Concert, known as "4 Million Child Blow 2000", in Oklahoma City led by Yoko Ono and Kenny G on Pox, but a flood causes the concert to be relocated to Little Rock, Mr. Garrison's hometown. This causes him considerable anxiety (as he confesses to Mr. Mackey) for he had "sexual molestation issues" with his father in the past.

In Arkansas, the boys encounter a hostile group of kids from New York City, also there for the concert, who call them "queefs". At first, the boys do not understand what queef means; assuming the New York kids had made the word up, the boys try to get back at them by making up their own word: mung, which as it turns out, is a real word meaning "the stuff that comes out when you push down on a pregnant woman's stomach". Even the other South Park kids know this word, leading to the four being jeered by both the New Yorkers and their own classmates.

Meanwhile, Mr. Garrison has confronted his father about the issues of sexual molestation; however, the issue was not that his dad had molested him, but rather that he felt neglected because his father had not molested him. When Mr. Mackey finds out about this, he fears Mr. Garrison is so distraught about the issue that he could actually die if Mr. Garrison Sr. does not molest him.

On the night before the concert, the boys want to find a way to get back at the New York kids, and when Cartman succeeds in his efforts to discover the legendary "brown noise", a sound made with the recorder that causes the listener to lose control of their bowels and "crap their pants", the boys plan to trick the New York kids into playing it. However, by accident, the altered sheet music for the concert is discovered by the organizer of the concert and is photocopied and redistributed to everyone. Later that night, Mr. Garrison is molested in the middle of the night by a mysterious stranger, and he sets off for the concert happy to have sorted things out with his father. After he leaves, Kenny G exits a closet and refuses $100 from Mr. Garrison's father, revealing that Kenny G is actually the one who molested Mr. Garrison that night.

During the concert, the boys discover that everyone is playing the altered sheet music containing the brown note, and they race to stop the concert. But they are too late and the note is played, and with the power of four million recorders behind it, everyone in the world ends up defecating in their pants, whether they are watching the broadcast or otherwise. Some, e.g. Kenny, soil themselves to death (although, at the end of episode, Kenny is seen, alive and healthy, in the bus with the other kids). On the way back to the bus, Mr. Mackey briefly explains to the boys what a queef is, describing it as "a vaginal expulsion of gas, m'kay." Shortly after the incident, the New York kids show up again, but they become very impressed by the boys' prank and take back the negative feelings directed at them. Afterwards, Mr. Garrison is passionately kissed by Kenny G before leaving and thanks him, noting that he kisses just like his father, and the class then leaves and drives off into the stars.

== Episode ratings ==
=== United Kingdom ===
This was the first episode of South Park to be rated 18 in the UK for its video/DVD-release, due to the subplot in which Mr. Garrison wants to be sexually molested by his father. On the 2008 DVD release of Season 3, it was lowered to a 15 certificate.
