= Jakovasaurs =

- South Park episode
- Episode no.: Season 3 Episode 4
- Directed by: Matt Stone
- Written by: Trey Parker; Matt Stone; David Goodman
- Production code: 305
- Original air date: June 16, 1999

Episode chronology
← Previous "Succubus"	Next → "Tweek vs. Craig"
- South Park season 3

"Jakovasaurs" is the fourth episode of the third season of the American animated television series South Park, and the 35th episode of the series overall. It parodies the Star Wars character Jar Jar Binks from The Phantom Menace, which had been released four weeks before the episode aired, and it expresses how "betrayed" Parker and Stone felt as Star Wars fans by how "stupid" the character was. The episode originally aired on Comedy Central on June 16, 1999.

In the episode, Stan, Kyle, Cartman, and Kenny go camping in the woods. Cartman discovers a species that was thought to be extinct. This species is very annoying, and everyone in town, except Cartman, wants to get rid of them.

The episode was written by series creator Trey Parker & Matt Stone and David Goodman and directed by Stone in his last directorial work for an episode until "Cupid Ye" aired in 2023.

== Plot ==
While the four boys are camping at Stark's Pond they hear something in the woods. They seek help from Stan's uncle Jimbo and his war buddy Ned, who has lost his electrolarynx. Using a trap they discover an unusual creature that resembles a humanoid duck which turns out to be extremely annoying to everyone in town with the exception of Cartman, who is enchanted by its antics.

The town has a meeting to decide what is to be done about the creature when representatives from the Department of Interior (DOI) show up and inform the townspeople that it is a near-extinct "Jakovasaur", which they intend to use to repopulate the species. The townspeople name the creature "Hope" despite its name actually being "Joon-Joon".

Another Jakovasaur, which speaks English and is named "Jakov", makes itself known by seeking out Cartman and telling him he's looking for his wife Joon-Joon. Cartman, Kyle and Stan take Jakov to his wife in the barn where she is being held, but the townspeople hear them. Meanwhile, Jimbo brings Ned another voicebox; however, he buys the wrong model and Ned is now forced to speak with an Irish accent.

It is decided that the Jakovasaurs are to be given their own home in the hope that they will breed. However, problems arise when it is determined that both Jakov and Joon-Joon lack any genitalia. Dr. Mephisto instead artificially inseminates Joon-Joon, and after a gestation period of only four days, Joon-Joon gives birth to an entire litter of baby Jakovasaurs. It is quickly determined that the Jakovasaurs are a major disruption to everyday life for the people of South Park. The DOI reps sent to help repopulate the Jakovasaur species decide to abandon their duties because of how annoying the Jakovasaurs are. They make Cartman an official "Department of Interior Person", telling him he has authority and people must respect it. Emboldened by having "authoritah", Cartman becomes adamant in protecting the Jakovasaurs.

Fed up with the Jakovasaurs, the townspeople convince them to move to Memphis where they'll fit in as all the people there are "big, loud, annoying, and stupid". When Cartman finds out about the plan, he convinces the Jakovasaurs to stay in South Park instead. The townspeople then come up with a different way to get rid of the Jakovasaurs forever: by rigging a game show in which Jakov will play against Officer Barbrady so that Jakov will win a trip to France with "50 of his closest relatives." Because Jakov is so stupid, Barbrady actually wins, but everyone wants the Jakovasaurs gone so they declare him the winner anyway. Stan, Kyle and Kenny try to distract Cartman from the game show so he does not realize it is fixed and take him to classify a "new antelope species" they found in the woods (which is actually Kenny with branches taped to his head, who eventually gets eaten by a bear that mistakes him for an antelope). Cartman realizes the trick and figures out the game is rigged, prompting him to rush to warn Jakov.

Cartman is too late, and he arrives at the airport just as the plane carrying Jakov and his family taxis down the runway and lifts off. The townspeople approach a brokenhearted Cartman and tell him they learned that not every form of life is worth saving, and that it is better to let nature run its course. During this, Ned voices his input with a voice box that accurately captures his original voice (as heard in flashback during "The Mexican Staring Frog of Southern Sri Lanka"), only for him and Jimbo to conclude that said voice box sucks.

The episode ends showing the Jakovasaurs on tour in Paris, looking for the Pyramids, when Jakov trips and crashes into a cafe full of French people. Rather than getting annoyed, the French people instead laugh and remark on how he reminds them of Jerry Lewis.

== Production ==
The episode was produced just weeks before the release of South Park: Bigger, Longer & Uncut, and its production ran concurrently with the movie's post-production, a process which the show's creators described as "hell". The episode aired on June 16, 1999, the same day that Trey Parker was putting the finishing touches to the movie's sound mix. Before producing the episode, the creators had done a Jar Jar based spoof for the MTV movie awards, which MTV refused to run.

The episode was written by series creators Trey Parker & Matt Stone and David Goodman and because of Parker finishing the movie, it was directed by Stone in his last directorial work for an episode until "Cupid Ye" aired in 2023.

== Reception ==
The episode has received mixed reviews from critics. Travis Pickett of IGN gave the episode a 6/10, ultimately saying the "Jakovasaur" joke goes on for too long and was dragged on.
