= Are You There God? It's Me, Jesus =

- South Park episode
- Episode no.: Season 3 Episode 16
- Directed by: Eric Stough
- Written by: Trey Parker; Matt Stone
- Production code: 316
- Original air date: December 29, 1999

Episode chronology
← Previous "Mr. Hankey's Christmas Classics"	Next → "World Wide Recorder Concert"
- South Park season 3

"Are You There God? It's Me, Jesus" is the sixteenth and penultimate episode of the third season of the animated television series South Park and the 47th episode of the series overall. It was originally broadcast on December 29, 1999. The episode's title and the theme of menstruation was inspired by the book Are You There God? It's Me, Margaret.

== Plot synopsis ==
As the year 2000 is approaching, Cartman realizes blood is coming out of his anus, leading him to believe he is experiencing his first period and thus commencing puberty. He makes fun of the other boys for not hitting puberty yet, unaware that his bleeding is caused by a minor stomach infection that has spread across South Park, and that it can be cured with antibiotics. Kenny later contracts the same ailment, and Kyle, not wanting to be left out, pretends he is also afflicted. The boys consequently abandon Stan and leave him out of their next mission, believing he is less mature for not having had his period.

Meanwhile, the people of the world flock around Jesus' house, excited about the new millennium and saying that, at the year 2000, Jesus' father should make an appearance. Jesus contacts his father and tells him about his potential resurgence in popularity, but God (unseen in their conversation) refuses to show up because mankind is not ready. Jesus, wanting to still satisfy the people, books Rod Stewart to play a New Year's Eve concert in Las Vegas; everybody decides to go, because a rumor persists that God will show up.

Stan, meanwhile, prays for his period, but doesn't get it, so he visits Dr. Mephesto and gets a bottle of hormone pills. Using them causes Stan to grow a beard, have a deeper voice, and develop a pair of breasts, but still no "period." Afterwards, as he, Kyle and Cartman discuss their inner goddesses, Kenny starts to groan in pain before suddenly slumping over, spraying a gush of blood from his mouth; the doctor is unable to revive him through surgery, and he dies. The doctor then discloses the reason to his parents: Kenny had shoved a tampon up his rectum and had left it up there so long his organs ruptured from the waste backup. The doctor expresses concern that the children are all shoving tampons up their rectums because "they've seen the Backstreet Boys doing it on TV or something"; he vows to research the cause, but decides to do so after Jesus's New Year concert.

The crowd in Las Vegas for the New Year's concert is enraged upon seeing Rod Stewart (portrayed here as very old and incontinent) and they turn against Jesus. With them preparing to crucify him again, Stan asks Jesus why God does not answer his prayers, and Jesus explains that, if God does everything for you, then your existence has no real purpose. Jesus realizes that this was God's message: Jesus had to figure his own way to get people to follow him. And just as he realizes this, God arrives.

After the crowd's initial shock over God's appearance (distinctly unlike traditional depictions of God), God offers the people the chance to ask one question. The crowd plans to ask the meaning of life or existence, but before anyone else can ask, Stan comes up and asks why he hasn't gotten his period. God explains that boys don't get periods, and tells the truth: that Cartman and Kenny are affected by the colon infection and Kyle was lying to fit in with them. God explains to Stan that he will never get a period (because he is male), but he will hit puberty when the time is right. He then returns to Heaven, saying He will answer another question in the year 4000. Stan is satisfied by this, and joyfully starts singing "Auld Lang Syne", but the angry crowd attacks him for wasting their chance to ask God a profoundly important question, as the credits roll.

== Production notes ==
In the DVD commentary for the episode, Trey Parker and Matt Stone said that Comedy Central wanted them to produce this episode for the new millennium as every other show was producing Y2K episodes, despite that the season had ended with the prior episode Mr. Hankey's Christmas Classics. Initially, Trey Parker intended for God to look like somewhat a mixture of a cat and a hippo.

This was the first episode to feature Eliza Schneider and Mona Marshall providing the voices for the female characters following Mary Kay Bergman's death. Schneider would continue to voice her roles until Season 7 (replaced with April Stewart), and Marshall continues to be a part of the show's cast.
