= Succubus (South Park) =

- South Park episode
- Episode no.: Season 3 Episode 3
- Directed by: Trey Parker
- Written by: Trey Parker
- Production code: 303
- Original air date: April 21, 1999

Episode chronology
← Previous "Spontaneous Combustion"	Next → "Jakovasaurs"
- South Park season 3

"Succubus" is the third episode of the third season of the American animated television series South Park, and the 34th episode of the series overall. It originally aired on Comedy Central in the United States on April 21, 1999.

== Plot ==
Cartman must go to the local eye doctor, whom he hates because the doctor always makes fun of his obesity by referring to him as "Piggy". Cartman is told that he has bad vision and has his eyes dilated; he is later given a pair of thick-rimmed glasses which are then stapled to his head so that he cannot take them off. Later, he and the other boys discover that Chef has quit his job at South Park Elementary and has been replaced by Mr. Derp, a cliché cartoon character who tries (and fails) to win them over with his poor slapstick comedy gags.

They then find out that Chef has a new girlfriend, Veronica (voiced by Michael Ann Young), who has caused his life to change from that of a free-spirited, soul-singing cafeteria chef to that of a bland office worker. She is also extremely fond of singing the love theme from The Poseidon Adventure, "The Morning After", at inappropriate times. The boys believe that she is trying to steal Chef away from them and are dismayed when they discover that the two are planning to get married.

Not wanting Chef to go too, the boys seek advice from Mr. Garrison, who suggests that Veronica is a succubus, a demoness sent from Hell to prey on and suck the life out of men. The boys try to warn Chef, but instead are forced to spend the evening with Chef's parents, who are obsessed with the Loch Ness Monster. The boys end up listening to a bunch of stories about it chasing Chef's parents and persuading them to give it about "tree-fiddy" ($3.50).

Meanwhile, a botched attempt at laser eye surgery leaves Cartman temporarily blinded. While the others mock him, Veronica comes to visit them. She manages to convince them that she is not a monster but, just as she is about to leave, suddenly takes on a demonic face, laughing maniacally and declaring that they cannot stop her from marrying Chef. The boys try to tell Chef of this at the rehearsal dinner, but he angrily shuts them out. They go back to Cartman's place to formulate a plan to stop the wedding.

The boys discover that a succubus controls the minds of men with a melody and that playing it backwards will vanquish it. They remember that Veronica always sings "The Morning After" and proceed to learn how to sing the song backwards. At the wedding, they play a tape of the song backwards while Stan and Kyle sing the words in reverse order. Veronica begins to lose her hold on her human form. When the tape gets jammed, she peels off her human disguise and reverts to her true shape—a bizarre, red-eyed, bat-winged, witch/hag-like monster—flying around and wrecking the church (and killing Kenny in the process). When the boys finish singing the song, Veronica is sucked back into Hell. Chef, no longer under the succubus's spell, apologizes to the boys for ignoring them and eventually returns to their school as the chef and as his old self.

Cartman returns to his optometrist, who tells him that, with eyes as bad as his, he will always have to wear glasses. He solves this problem by convincing the doctor to give him an eye transplant, using Kenny's frozen head as a donor. The optometrist then asks for $3.50, suggesting that Chef's parents' tales were not entirely fabricated.

== Production ==
Parker and Stone say in the DVD commentary that the sketch involving the Loch Ness Monster was the inspiration for the character Chef. Originally Comedy Central would not let the creators voice African-American characters on the show. The episode also popularized the word derp. A television promo of the episode showed that the character Ms. Crabtree was originally Chef's replacement in the episode.
