= Jewbilee =

- South Park episode
- Moses as depicted in South Park, a large glowing floating dreidel being worshipped by the Jewish Boy Scouts
- Episode no.: Season 3 Episode 9
- Directed by: Trey Parker
- Written by: Trey Parker
- Production code: 309
- Original air date: July 28, 1999

Episode chronology
← Previous "Two Guys Naked in a Hot Tub"	Next → "Korn's Groovy Pirate Ghost Mystery"
- South Park season 3

"Jewbilee" is the ninth-aired and produced episode of the third season of the animated television series South Park. The 40th overall episode and the final part of The Meteor Shower Trilogy, the episode describes what happens to Kyle and Kenny as they attend a Jewish Scouting camp on the night of the meteor shower. The episode, which satirizes stereotypes about Jews, originally aired on July 28, 1999.

== Plot ==
As Gerald and Sheila Broflovski are getting ready to attend Mr. Mackey's meteor shower party, Kyle and his brother Ike are preparing to go to Jewbilee, a Boy Scout-esque camp for Jewish boys. Kyle invites Kenny to attend, even though Gerald and Sheila warn Kyle that Kenny may not be accepted because he is not Jewish. Kyle persuades them to let Kenny come along, and they explain the basic tenets of Judaism during the car ride to the camp. After dropping the boys off, Gerald and Sheila drive to Mr. Mackey's party.

The camp attendees are divided into two age groups, Jew Scouts (older boys) and Squirts (younger, similar to the Cub Scouts). Following the induction ceremony, the boys make arts-and-crafts projects to honor the prophet Moses, whose spirit manifests itself on the site. Kenny is banished from the camp after Moses identifies him as a non-Jew; as he tries to return home, police officers and ATF agents drive past from Mr. Mackey's house, having mistaken it for a cult meeting place. Kenny returns to the camp only to find that Garth, one of the camp's elders, has trapped Moses in a conch shell and locked the Jew Scouts and the other elders in a cabin. Garth, who is from the Synagogue of Antisemites, intends to summon the spirit of Haman and force Jews into servitude.

Meanwhile, the Squirts' leader, Shlomo, mobilizes the troop to help catch a bear in the surrounding woods so he can earn his "Chutzpah" merit badge. The bear captures one Squirt after another, and Shlomo continues to devise plans that ultimately fail. After all the Squirts have been captured, Shlomo seeks out the chief elder but stumbles across Garth's plan to summon Haman; he tries to free Moses, but Garth shoots and wounds him. Kenny is captured by the bear as well, but finds that instead of harming the Squirts, it has brought them to celebrate the birthday of its cub. Kenny leads the Squirts back to camp, finding the summoning ritual nearly completed. As the Squirts form a human ladder to reach the cabin keys and free the captives, Kenny disrupts the ritual and smashes the conch with his own head, freeing Moses but fatally injuring himself. Moses destroys Haman, kills Garth, and declares a new annual holiday in which the Jew Scouts will gather at the camp and honor Kenny's sacrifice by making arts-and-crafts projects.

== Production ==
The writing process of "Jewbilee" helped South Park co-creators Trey Parker and Matt Stone realize the approach to writing most suited for the show. The episode had to be aired about a month after the film South Park: Bigger, Longer & Uncut was released, at which time Parker and Stone could take a break from their intensive work. They were pleased with their work on both the show and the film and decided not to care about how good the episode was, and "just make it dumb and weird." Eventually, they came to believe that "Jewbilee" was then one of the best episodes of the show, which helped them realize that they should not try to think of the plots for too long, but "just be stupid and have fun."

== Cultural and religious references ==
Many mythological details in the episode are loosely borrowed from traditional Jewish celebrations of Purim.

The Moses character is Parker's favorite aspect of the episode. His appearance is patterned after the Master Control Program from the film Tron.

== Reception ==
John Sinnott of DVD Talk stated that the episode is one of the third season's "strange shows that worked very well." In an article about Isaac Hayes' departure controversy, The Seattle Times referred to "Jewbilee" as one of the show's most outrageous episodes.
