= Sexual Harassment Panda =

- South Park episode
- Episode no.: Season 3 Episode 6
- Directed by: Eric Stough
- Written by: Trey Parker
- Production code: 306
- Original air date: July 7, 1999

Episode chronology
← Previous "South Park: Bigger, Longer and Uncut"	Next → "Cat Orgy"
- South Park season 3

"Sexual Harassment Panda" is the sixth episode of the third season of the American animated television series South Park, and the 37th episode overall of the series. It originally aired on Comedy Central in the United States on July 7, 1999. In the episode, a school presentation on sexual harassment prevention leads to Cartman suing Stan for sexual harassment, which in turn promotes a series of sexual harassment lawsuits across South Park.

This was the first episode to air after the release of the theatrical film South Park: Bigger, Longer & Uncut. According to the DVD commentary of the episode, Parker and Stone were so exhausted and hungover from doing the South Park film that they have no memory of making this episode.

== Plot ==
Mr. Garrison's class is visited by an educational mascot, "Petey the Sexual Harassment Panda", who attempts to teach the kids about sexual harassment so as to prevent it in school. During the visit, Stan calls Cartman an "ass-sucker", and Cartman, "inspired" by the panda's teaching, sues Stan for sexual harassment, claiming that he's sexually harassed him for the last time; Kyle's father, Gerald Broflovski, acts as his lawyer, and Cartman wins half of Stan's possessions. Gerald then decides to encourage Cartman (and later, others) not only to sue each other but also the teachers and the school, leading to chaos throughout the town as he gets rich. Kyle's dad quickly becomes the target of many people's wrath, while he continues to move his family into successively larger homes with his newly gained assets. Soon afterwards the whole town is suing each other and Gerald is taking advantage of this by being a lawyer for them all, getting more and more money from every case. Because everyone is scared of being sued, no one can stand up to Gerald.

Because the school board needs to cut costs, Sexual Harassment Panda is fired. He cannot get a new job as a panda mascot, and refuses to change his costume due to an apparently genuine belief that he's a panda. Thus, he goes to the Island of Misfit Mascots Commune, for mascots whose messages simply make no sense. Many mascots there also seem to believe they are the animals they portray. The boys, however, seeing the negative results of the lawsuits on their school, track Sexual Harassment Panda down and arrive at the Island of Misfit Mascots (where one of the mascots accidentally kills Kenny); they persuade Sexual Harassment Panda to return to town with a new message. Meanwhile, Gerald is litigating the biggest sexual harassment lawsuit ever, Everyone vs. Everyone, where he represents everyone who hires him to take on everyone else (flagrantly disregarding conflict of interest in the process).

The panda arrives back in South Park under a new name, "Petey the Don't Sue People Panda", and delivers a sermon on how people should not sue each other constantly because it does nothing but damage the school system, taking away money from classrooms, schools and themselves, the taxpayers. The people, realizing the sagacity of this statement, angrily cry that they should sue Gerald, who quickly agrees to file no more lawsuits about sexual harassment in schools or anywhere else. In the end, all the sexual harassment suits are dropped and Kyle's dad presumably gets away with millions of dollars.

== Cultural references ==
This episode satirizes the widely publicized lawsuits over sexual harassment in schools that occurred in the late 1990s, as well as ambulance-chasing lawyers. The Island of Misfit Mascots Commune is a parody of The Island of Misfit Toys from Rudolph the Red-Nosed Reindeer. Sexual Harassment Panda is a parody of Ike the Coast Guard Panda, a mascot for the United States Coast Guard who encourages kids to wear life vests. Parker and Stone indicated in the DVD commentary that the panda is Santa Claus from "Jesus vs. Frosty", as they have the same voice.
