= The Red Badge of Gayness =

- South Park episode
- Episode no.: Season 3 Episode 14
- Directed by: Trey Parker
- Written by: Trey Parker
- Production code: 314
- Original air date: November 24, 1999

Episode chronology
← Previous "Starvin' Marvin in Space"	Next → "Mr. Hankey's Christmas Classics"
- South Park season 3

"The Red Badge of Gayness" is the fourteenth episode of the third season of the animated television series South Park and the 45th episode of the series overall. It originally aired on November 24, 1999. In the episode, the boys participate in the South Park Civil War reenactment. To win a bet, Cartman convinces the reenactors to try to alter history and leads them throughout the United States. The episode's name is a reference to the war novel The Red Badge of Courage, and parodies Ken Burns' documentary miniseries The Civil War and the 1993 film Gettysburg.

== Plot ==
As the men of South Park are preparing to hold their annual American Civil War reenactment of the (fictional) Battle of Tamarack Hill, the children rehearse as a Union Army rally band.

In the morning of the reenactment, Stan's uncle, Jimbo informs the reenactors that over 200 people will come to see them reenact the battle, setting a new record. He also takes the time to remind everyone that the primary alcohol sponsor of their event is Jagerminz S'more-flavored Schnapps, "the schnapps with the delightful taste of s'mores." In addition, the special guest will be Stan's grandpa, Marvin Marsh. Meanwhile, Cartman comes dressed as General Robert E. Lee, and the boys are outraged by his dressing as a Confederate officer. Evidently under the impression that the reenactment is a competition of some sort, Cartman bets that the South will win the Civil War, and if it does, Stan and Kyle will be his slaves for a month, or vice versa. Knowing that the outcome is supposed to be historical victory for the North as planned, Stan and Kyle eagerly accept the challenge.

Cartman manipulates the drunken Confederate reenactors into actually striving to win the reenactment. At the after party, all of the reenactors, Confederate and Unionist, are now drunk on the Schnapps, Cartman rallies them to attack Topeka, which is presumed by the reenactors to have been the next battle. The next day, Topeka is assaulted by the drunken South Park Confederates and the entire town falls. As the invasion continues town by town, their ranks are continually bolstered by either Confederate supporters or men who would simply choose to avoid fighting them. Stan, Kyle, and Grampa Marsh travel to Chattanooga which is under attack by the Confederates. The National Guard also arrives on the scene and shoots a warning flare into the air which kills Kenny (who had joined the Confederates under Cartman's promise of "lots of plunder and womens").

The boys hatch a plan to rid the army of their primary fuel, the S'More Schnapps. The army soon wakes up with raging hangovers and quickly disbands, but Cartman calls the Jägerminz company, who deliver to the entire army truckloads of alcohol. With the men drunk again, the next target of the Confederates is Fort Sumter. Though they easily overrun and secure the fort, they are then faced with the National Guard. The latter is defeated with help from Confederate reinforcements made up of the entire population of South Carolina.

Finally the Confederate Army reaches Washington, D.C. The army demands the Confederate States of America to be a separate country and blackmail President Clinton by threatening to release a (bluff) video of him with Marisa Tomei. Grandpa, realizing that the drunken men still think that the entire campaign is a reenactment, gets Stan and Kyle dressed up as Jefferson Davis and Abraham Lincoln, just in time to prevent Clinton from signing the surrender, with the added condition that the South receive a free year's supply of Schnapps. The entire army breaks up happily and leaves upon surrender to Cartman's dismay, Stan and Kyle then rip Cartman's beard off causing him to scream in pain which echoes through earth to space.

Stan and Kyle are deciding what to make Cartman do, having won the bet, but their triumph is short-lived. Cartman is saved from the terms of the bet after remembering the North still won the war, and that slavery was abolished because of it. Clinton makes this clear by pointing out that the abolition of slavery was one of the significant outcomes of the Civil War, making slavery illegal and the bet nullified. Angered by this, Stan and Kyle insult Clinton before walking away, embittered.

== Production ==
After the production of the previous episode, the voice actor of many female South Park roles, Mary Kay Bergman, died by suicide. Parker and Stone, still in shock from her death, did not feel like auditioning people right away, which is why this episode features no female voices (Trey Parker voices the S'mores Schnapps Lady and the schoolteacher in Topeka, and Kenny's mother Carol appears with no speaking parts).

The episode parodies the film Gettysburg, which Parker and Stone disliked.

== Critical reception ==
In 2013, fans voted "The Red Badge of Gayness" as the best episode of Season 3 on the official South Park website.

== Home media ==
"The Red Badge of Gayness," along with the sixteen other episodes from The Complete Third Season, were released on a three-disc DVD set in the United States on June 18, 2001. The set includes brief audio commentaries by Parker and Stone for each episode.
