= Rainforest Shmainforest =

- South Park episode
- Episode no.: Season 3 Episode 1
- Directed by: Trey Parker; Eric Stough
- Written by: Trey Parker; Matt Stone
- Production code: 301
- Original air date: April 7, 1999

Guest appearance
- Jennifer Aniston as Miss Stevens

Episode chronology
← Previous "Prehistoric Ice Man"	Next → "Spontaneous Combustion"
- South Park season 3

"Rainforest Shmainforest" is the third season premiere of Comedy Central's animated series South Park. It originally aired on April 7, 1999, and is the 32nd episode overall. This episode features Jennifer Aniston providing the voice for Miss Stevens. The episode serves as a lampooning of performative activism (particularly within the American Movement to Save the Rain Forest), and also mocks Costa Rica. The episode's title includes a shm-reduplication.

This episode was written by series co-creators Trey Parker & Matt Stone and co-directed by Parker with Eric Stough, their first work as co-directors for an episode and it was inspired by Trey Parker's intense distaste towards rainforests and Costa Rica. Parker explains on the DVD commentary that, at the suggestion of Flea, Parker and his girlfriend went to Costa Rica and hated the country, and that everything Cartman says about the rainforests and Costa Rica during the episode is how he (Parker) personally feels.

The episode is also filled with famous environmentalist clichés, such as, "We must take only photos and leave only footprints", "It's more afraid of us than we are of it", and "We have to respect mother nature and she will respect us." It is also the second episode of the series' first five seasons in which Kenny survives (although he gets struck by lightning, he is resuscitated).

== Plot ==
Miss Stevens (voiced by Jennifer Aniston), the leader of the "Getting Gay With Kids" environmentalist choir tour, visits South Park Elementary, trying to recruit more kids to the group. The boys get themselves into trouble after calling the choir names and belittling their cause. They are sent to Mr. Mackey's office, so as punishment, the boys will join the choir, since he happens to be on the board of directors. Kenny is the only one who is happy about it, since he has developed a crush on a girl in the choir named Kelly.

The choir goes to San José, Costa Rica, to tour, where Miss Stevens tells Cartman that she plans on changing his views on third-world countries. Upon arriving, Cartman immediately starts to make trouble, including yelling at Costa Ricans, directing everyone's attention to prostitutes, and commenting that San José "smells like ass." The children get to meet the Costa Rican President and do a preview dance routine for some citizens of San José (with a pre-recorded song for the kids to lip-sync to), but Miss Stevens is dismayed by Kyle's lack of coordination. Cartman offers the opinion that Kyle cannot dance because he is Jewish, and "Jewish people don't have any rhythm." Kyle angrily denies this as a stereotype, but Stan wonders if it is true, making Kyle fear this possibility.

The children then take a tour to see the "wonders" of the rainforest. Cartman starts hitting the native animals there, irritating Miss Stevens. Eventually, their tour guide is killed, eaten, and excreted by a coral snake, all surprisingly in the space of less than a minute, leaving Miss Stevens and the children on their own in the jungle. Cartman angrily hits the snake on the head in response, which causes it to temporarily chase him (likely to do the same thing to him as it'd done to their tour guide). They run into a group of guerrilla rebels and try to convince them to help them get back to San José, but the leader merely criticizes and insults them. When government troops arrive, the choir has to run away. After more time spent wandering lost, Cartman announces that he is leaving the "hippie" group. Only moments later, he finds a friendly crew of white construction workers tearing down trees and tells them all about the group getting lost, though not before asking for food. Meanwhile, Kelly takes Kenny to one side and admits her feelings for him, but tries to stop herself from going too far, which annoys Kenny, as she lives on the other side of the US and cannot manage a long-distance relationship.

Back in San José, the concert is about an hour away from starting, and the President stalls for time by telling poorly-thought-out "Polak" jokes. Miss Stevens and the remaining children are captured by a tribe of indigenous people called the Yanagapa (a phonetic parody of the South American indigenous demonym Yanomama), who offer up Miss Stevens, now dressed in a Stanford-looking cheerleading outfit, as an offering to a giant indigenous man, with Kelly voicing that this offering is more than likely that of a sexual nature. At this point, Miss Stevens finally snaps, changing her mind and deciding that the rainforest is not such a good place, after all. She screams profanities about everything rainforest-related, much to the shock and confusion of the indigenous inhabitants (and to the boys' annoyance over how long it had taken for her to "get it"). Just then, Cartman and the white construction workers arrive to destroy the village, kill the indigenous people, and save Miss Stevens and the children. Just as Kelly is making arrangements with Kenny to maintain a long-distance relationship, he is immediately struck dead by a bolt of lightning. Kelly asks Stan and Kyle for help, but the two are fulfilling their usual catchphrases, outraging Kelly. She then desperately attempts CPR and successfully revives Kenny, to the amazement of Stan and Kyle. With this result, Kenny has successfully survived an entire episode for the second time (the first time being "Mr. Hankey, the Christmas Poo").

When the group escapes the forest, Miss Stevens and the children are so happy to leave the jungle that they change their tune: different lyrics are applied to the original song, which now rebukes the rainforest rather than praise it, while also calling out the so-called "activists" who support saving the rainforest for their activism being purely performative and never actually having been to the rainforest themselves.

The episode ends with a message telling people about the dangers of the rainforest and to help stop it.

== Controversy ==
Despite the episode airing in 1999 in the U.S. and a few years later in Latin America, the episode caused some controversy in February 2007 over the comments that Cartman made about Costa Rica saying that the town of San José "smells like ass" and the way the creators show the country full of "prostitutes, shantytowns, and trash." The Costa Rican government was reportedly "not amused" by this episode.

== Critical reception ==
Andy Patrizio of IGN wrote "Rainforest Shmainforest, is one of my favorites [of the third season]...Hearing [guest voice Jennifer Aniston] lose it at the end, with Stan's line "Now she gets it" was just a hoot." DVD Verdict wrote "Rainforest Schmainforest is a hilarious take on Up with People, ecological activists, and foreign cultures".
