= Tweek vs. Craig =

- South Park episode
- Episode no.: Season 3 Episode 5
- Directed by: Trey Parker
- Written by: Trey Parker
- Production code: 304
- Original air date: June 23, 1999

Episode chronology
← Previous "Jakovasaurs"	Next → "South Park: Bigger, Longer and Uncut"
- South Park season 3

"Tweek vs. Craig" is the fifth episode of the third season of the American animated television series South Park, and the 36th episode of the series overall. It originally aired on Comedy Central in the United States on June 23, 1999. In the episode Stan, Kyle and Cartman manipulate Tweek and Craig into fighting each other. Meanwhile, the boys' wood shop teacher, Mr. Adler, struggles to cope with the loss of his wife, who died in a plane crash.

The episode was written and directed by series co-creator Trey Parker and is rated TV-MA in the United States. It was the last South Park episode to air before the film, South Park: Bigger, Longer & Uncut, was released one week later on June 30.

== Plot ==
The episode begins with the boys on their first day of wood shop. Mr. Adler, their teacher, tells the students not to "screw around". They are also asked who the biggest troublemaker in their class is. Stan and Kyle claim that Tweek is, while Cartman argues that it is Craig. To settle the dispute Stan, Kyle and Cartman make a bet over who would win a fight between Tweek and Craig. The boys set off tension between Tweek and Craig, and they agree to fight after school.

Meanwhile, Mr. Adler dealing with troubling memories of his deceased wife (which are portrayed in live action) every time he looks at a photo of her. To deal with the memories, he consumes great amounts of nicotine gum. Later, it is revealed that she was a pilot whose plane exploded in mid-air and crashed into the ocean, where she drowned.

When a crowd forms to see the fight, Clyde announces that both Tweek and Craig went home. Stan and Kyle go to Tweek's house, and Tweek explains that he had no reason to fight Craig. Eager to settle the bet, Stan and Kyle tell Tweek that Craig did show up to fight but degraded him instead. Meanwhile, Cartman and Kenny convince Craig to reschedule the fight as well. The next day, when the fight between Craig and Tweek is about to take place, it is revealed that neither know how to fight, and the battle is postponed again until they learn how to fight. Craig gets to learn martial arts with the aid of Cartman who considers sumo as a future career. Tweek is taught to box by Stan's uncle Jimbo and his friend Ned.

Throughout the episode, Kenny has not been attending shop class, but home economics, largely in order to cozy up to his female classmates. Kenny is told to transfer to shop class by the teacher with the claim that home ec is not "right for him" and he will most likely not find a husband. Although terrified at the thought of being around all the tools (another reason why he didn't take shop class), Kenny has no choice and transfers.

The school day ends and Tweek and Craig finally start the long-awaited fight. Meanwhile, in his shop class, Mr. Adler writes a suicide note explaining he cannot cope with his fiancée's death and that he has run out of nicotine gum. He climbs onto the slowly moving table saw feet first and awaits his death. He then gets up and shouts "Jesus Christ! What was I thinking?!", then repositions himself to go head first, saying "That would have hurt like hell!" Kenny comes in to the shop classroom, and Mr. Adler puts him to work on the jigsaw. Tweek and Craig fly through the shop classroom window, still fighting. Mr. Adler climbs down from the table saw and demands to know what is going on. Tweek and Craig knock the stool out from underneath Kenny, and Kenny hangs on the saw machine. Tweek slams Craig into a second saw which knocks over the one Kenny is on. Kenny's jacket is caught by the blade, and he is spun around and then flies into a box of old, rusty, sharp nails.

When Mr. Adler picks up Kenny's body, his fiancée (along with his grandmother and uncle) talks to him through Kenny, telling him to move on. Mr. Adler says he can and hugs Kenny. Stan, unaware of the situation, delivers the familiar phrase to Kyle, "Dude, this is pretty fucked up right here." The kids go to the hospital to visit Tweek and Craig to tell them about the bet. They tell Tweek and Craig that each boy's family called the other's wusses on the news, which revitalizes the fight.

== Production ==
Mr. Adler is based on a teacher Matt Stone had in elementary school, whose name was bleeped multiple times on DVD commentary. The situation where the Pam Brady character yells, "It's all for you!" to Mr. Adler is an allusion to the film The Omen; at Damien's birthday party, these are the same last words the nanny cries right before she jumps off the roof to hang herself.

Mr. Adler's fiancé was portrayed in the live action scenes by Pam Brady, one of the show's writers.

This episode includes common musical pieces. The music used during the sumo training scenes was, at the time, the theme music used on CNBC's program Street Signs. Terrance, Mephesto's son, returns for this episode. When Kenny has a vision of all the sharp tools that would be around him if he transferred to Shop Class, the music that plays is an excerpt from Baba Yaga, the ninth movement of Modest Mussorgsky's "Pictures at an Exhibition" suite, which has also been used in several other episodes.
