= Starvin' Marvin in Space =

- South Park episode
- Episode no.: Season 3 Episode 13
- Directed by: Trey Parker
- Written by: Trey Parker; Matt Stone; Kyle McCulloch
- Production code: 311
- Original air date: November 17, 1999

Episode chronology
← Previous "Hooked on Monkey Fonics"	Next → "The Red Badge of Gayness"
- South Park season 3

"Starvin' Marvin in Space" is the thirteenth episode and the 11th produced episode of the third season of the animated television series South Park and the 44th episode of the series overall. It originally aired on Comedy Central in the United States on November 17, 1999. Like the episode "Mr. Hankey's Christmas Classics", the episode is dedicated to Mary Kay Bergman, who lent her voice to nearly all of South Park's female characters. This was the last episode Mary Kay Bergman, who died by suicide shortly after production was completed, recorded dialogue for and the second to last episode with her voice in it.

== Plot ==
An alien lands on Earth to make first contact in the African desert. Not realizing it is facing lions, it is killed and devoured. Its ship is discovered by the people from Starvin' Marvin's village. The village is occupied by Christian missionaries led by Sister Hollis (voiced by Michael Ann Young), who attempt to convert the community by assuring them that their faith in Christianity will get them food, prompting Marvin to board the ship in search of a place free of missionaries to relocate his people. Meanwhile, two agents with the Central Intelligence Agency (CIA), having found out about this spaceship and wanting it for themselves, track down the boys and torture them by making scraping noises on a balloon until Cartman suddenly cannot take it anymore and tells them where Starvin' Marvin might have taken it. The two government agents then recruit Sally Struthers, whose character is depicted as looking similar to Jabba the Hutt. She is the leader of an Ethiopian food drive that is nothing more than a front for her to get all the food she wants. After she picks up the scent of a Chocolate Yum Yum bar in the pocket of one of the agents, the two men offer her more of them in exchange.

Marvin and the boys team up, and by accidentally pressing a button, they fly via a wormhole to the home planet of the ship's owner: the planet Marklar, whose inhabitants speak a language that is identical to English except for the fact that every noun is replaced with the word "Marklar". The benevolent Marklar agree to allow the Ethiopians to live on their planet. Back on Earth, the boys try to round up the Ethiopians, but the government agents seize the spaceship. The boys are able to take back the spaceship, letting Marvin load his people on while the boys distract the government agents, pretending to be Tom Brokaw. The agents are easily able to see through the disguise. Despite this, they are distracted long enough to load the ship, but Kenny is lost and seized by the government agents when the boys try to make a break for it.

The boys try to make it to Marklar, but they are confronted by the missionaries, who have built their own ship and are trying to force Christianity to Marklar. During this time, while broadcasting his show The 600 Club on the Christian Broadcasting Channel, Pat Robertson is shown attempting to raise funds for various absurd weapons and upgrades to aid the missionaries while in space. A space battle ensues, before the boys have to face the government agents. The agents have had Kenny frozen in carbonite and given to Struthers so she can support them. Cartman convinces Struthers that she has influenced the boys that they need to help people more. This touches Struthers, so she lets the boys go and captures the missionary ship instead. Then, the wormhole is opened again, and all ships are taken to Marklar.

When they arrive on Marklar, the aliens are very confused by the humans' attempts to explain their motives. Kyle explains the situation in the aliens' own language, and the Marklar are moved. They banish the missionaries and let the Ethiopians stay. The boys promise to visit again (with Cartman sarcastically adding "Yeah, and maybe Jesse Jackson will be President!"). Struthers then takes the boys back to Earth.

== Production ==
The depiction of Pat Robertson and The 700 Club is used as an example of South Park episodes that lampoon the religious right.

This is the first time that South Park did a cold open with no credits. On the DVD commentary, Parker and Stone refer to this as the first episode of Starvin' Marvin in Space instead of a South Park episode.
