= Spontaneous Combustion (South Park) =

- South Park episode
- Episode no.: Season 3 Episode 2
- Directed by: Matt Stone
- Written by: Trey Parker; Matt Stone; David Goodman
- Production code: 302
- Original air date: April 14, 1999

Episode chronology
← Previous "Rainforest Shmainforest"	Next → "Succubus"
- South Park season 3

"Spontaneous Combustion" is the second episode of the third season of the American animated television series South Park, and is the 33rd episode overall. It originally aired in the United States on April 14, 1999.

In the episode, Kenny and many other townsfolk start dying from spontaneous combustion. Mayor McDaniels puts Randy Marsh in charge of finding out why people are dying from it.

== Plot ==
Kyle discovers that his father Gerald and his mother Sheila are having marital difficulties caused by Gerald's erectile dysfunction, and he and the others (Kenny, Stan, and Cartman) try to give him "a ne-rection" (which the boys confuse with "a resurrection"), unaware of what it actually is. Meanwhile, various members of the town, beginning with Kenny, start to spontaneously combust, which causes the townspeople to attend church more, and compels Mayor McDaniels to order Randy Marsh to discern the cause for the combustions.

The boys get drawn into presenting the Stations of the Cross in church, with Cartman tied to the cross in the role of Jesus, after repeated pleading that he could not play any other role. Afterwards, the boys take the cross and put it up outside the church, with Cartman still attached, so that he will die and get a "res-erection" to give to Gerald. Meanwhile, Randy manages to find out that the combustions are caused by people refusing to flatulate in front of their partners (Kenny was spending some time with Kelly, his girlfriend from the previous episode) and so he encourages everyone in town to flatulate every few seconds. For this, he wins the Nobel Prize and a statue is made for him, much to the ire of South Park's only other scientist, Dr. Mephesto, who wanted to win the prize for creating a Galapagos turtle with seven asses; he then plots revenge.

Meanwhile, Cartman (still on the cross) is getting upset and tired that Stan and Kyle will not take him down, even going as far as claiming his mother Liane is worried and "calling" for him. He is later taken down by Chef until he tells him it was all "just a dream" and he is still on the cross, angering him even more.

Another crisis then comes up, when a heat wave hits the town, and again Randy is hired to figure out the cause. However, Mephesto beats him to it. He discovers that it is the methane gas from all the flatulence that led to the global warming. Randy, blamed for the crisis, is stripped of his Nobel Prize, and stoned and forced to walk through the town with his own statue on his back, being denied by his friends (as Jesus was in the Stations of the Cross). Meanwhile, Gerald manages to get an erection, after seeing some attractive, young female clients undress in his office (to show him the skin cancer for which they claim Randy is responsible); after telling Kyle everything is going to be alright, Kyle is so glad for his father that he forgets about Cartman on the cross.

Randy does not want to try to find a solution for his problem, since all the people in town would still hate him, even if he managed to solve the combustion/global warming conundrum. However, Stan tells him that he learned something from the Stations of the Cross: Even though Jesus was hated by all the people he knew and denied by his friends, he still did what he had to do and, as he was dying, raised his right hand and stated, "The needs of the many outweigh the needs of the few" (which Kyle later points out is a quote from Star Trek II: The Wrath of Khan). After going through extensive researching, Randy finds out that people need to flatulate only in moderation in order to fight against the global warming. This works well, and he ends up winning the town's accolades again, and gets his Nobel Prize back three weeks later, at which point the boys suddenly remember they had left Cartman out on the cross that long. They run to get him, and find him still alive but emaciated, having survived for three weeks on his accumulated body fat. Angered, Cartman then says (in a high pitched voice) that once he is taken down, he'll kick their groins. The song in Randy's daydream montage plays during the end credits.

== Production ==
"Spontaneous Combustion" was written by South Park creators Trey Parker and Matt Stone, and writer David Goodman. The episode was inspired in part by Stations of the Cross events Parker witnessed as a child. Parker said he thought it was funny to watch young children participate in the events, particularly in seeing the crucifixion of Jesus. Stone, an agnostic Jew and fellow South Park co-creator, had never heard of Stations of the Cross until Parker explained it to him during a meeting, to which Stone said, "I just thought it was the funniest thing". While making the episode, Parker and Stone were simultaneously making their South Park film, South Park: Bigger, Longer & Uncut. The duo would work on "Spontaneous Combustion" in one studio, then travel a mile away to a larger studio to work on the film. Paramount Pictures executives were not happy with the arrangement and preferred for Parker and Stone to stop working on the television series to focus on the film.

In writing the episode, Parker and Stone regularly consulted Anne Garefino, the South Park executive producer and a practicing Catholic; Stone said Garefino was a "good sport about it" and did not get offended by the show's jokes about Catholicism. Parker also said the show's elements about flatulence causing spontaneous combustion stemmed from his own serious belief that holding in farts can indeed cause humans to spontaneously combust. Parker said, "I honestly think it could be what spontaneous combustion is because I've seen some dudes light their farts, and the fireballs were big. And that was just one fart. I'm serious, I think it's totally possible."

== Theme ==
The episode satirizes religion in more ways than its reenactment of the Stations of the Cross. A church prayer, in which Priest Maxi prays for the success of the Denver Broncos, an NFL football team, has also been described as a satire on the way sports can take on a religious status due to the seriousness with which fans regard it. Maxi also suggests Kenny might not have been killed if the South Park residents had attended church more regularly, which satirizes the use of guilt to encourage participation in religion; this is further demonstrated by Mr. Garrison's comment, "Oh, here comes the guilt trip again!" Religious writer Michel Clasquin said the episode also demonstrates the way in which people "go through the right motions" in practicing religion by attending church, but disregard religion in their everyday lives; he cites the example that when Stan asks his father where their copy of the Bible is, he says it's in the attic "with the old LPs". Clasquin said "Spontaneous Combustion" also demonstrates the ease with which people blend their religious convictions with lessons from pop culture, particularly with Stan's confusion of a biblical verse and a Star Trek quote. Nevertheless, Clasquin said Stan does ultimately learn lessons of sacrifice and selflessness from the story of Jesus' crucifixion, so the episode ultimately upholds some of the more positive aspects of religion and Christianity.

The episode also satirizes adult pretentiousness, a common theme in South Park episodes, by portraying the children as wiser and more reasonable in seeking a solution to the spontaneous combustion problem. Although the adults follow trends and solutions that contradict common sense, namely avoiding spontaneous combustion by passing gas at all times, only the children are able to find a reasonable solution in the middle of two extremes: only passing gas when absolutely necessary or when it is "really, really funny".

== Cultural references ==
Cartman and the other South Park children reenact the Stations of the Cross, the depiction of the Passion (final hours) of Jesus, which end with his crucifixion. The line Stan quotes, which he mistakes for a Bible verse, is a line spoken by Spock in Star Trek II: The Wrath of Khan: "The needs of the many outweigh the needs of the few." During a church service, the Priest Maxi refers to two players who left the Denver Broncos: Neil Smith, who left the team in 1999 after becoming a free agent, and Steve Atwater, who joined the New York Jets in 1999. When Officer Barbrady passes by Cartman and says "T, T is for turtle", he is impersonating the typewriter from Sesame Street. Randy's daydream, which depicts a mummy chasing Stan, Kyle and himself through a series of doors, is a reference to Scooby-Doo. Gerald hears a Bob Dole commercial for an erectile dysfunction medicine when listening to the radio in his office.

== Reception ==
The episode was condemned by Graham Capill, the New Zealand conservative politician heading the Christian Heritage Party of New Zealand, now defunct. Capill, who was campaigning against the film South Park: Bigger, Longer & Uncut, which was released around the same time "Spontaneous Combustion" was broadcast, took exception to the episode's portrayal of the Stations of the Cross reenactment.

Many reviewers recommended the episode while simultaneously commenting on its offensive material. Peter Lalor of The Daily Telegraph described it as "another highly-recommended episode, although if you have sensitive Christian values perhaps you would be better off missing this episode". Paul Thompson, of the Waikato Times, praised the episode and said it "had all the show's ingredients: obnoxious kids, hypocritical adults and barbed humour." Robert Bianco of USA Today recommended the episode, but said it was "almost certain to offend large segments of the population", particularly for its take on the Stations of the Cross. Although the Daily Breeze recommended the episode, they said it proved, "silliness and outrageousness continue to be this cartoon's calling card".

Doug Pratt, a DVD reviewer and Rolling Stone contributor, gave "Spontaneous Combustion" a negative review; he called it "pretty dopey" and said "Sure, it's funny if you like passing gas jokes, but its aspirations are limited."

The Chicago Tribune included "Spontaneous Combustion" in a list of seven South Park episodes illustrating the show's tendency to tackle controversial subjects, particularly with regard to religion.
