= Korn's Groovy Pirate Ghost Mystery =

- South Park episode
- Episode no.: Season 3 Episode 10
- Directed by: Trey Parker
- Written by: Trey Parker
- Production code: 312
- Original air date: October 27, 1999

Guest appearances
- Jonathan Davis as himself; James Shaffer as himself; Brian Welch as himself; Reginald Arvizu as himself; David Silveria as himself

Episode chronology
← Previous "Jewbilee"	Next → "Chinpokomon"
- South Park season 3

"Korn's Groovy Pirate Ghost Mystery" is the 10th-aired and the 12th-produced episode of the third season of the animated television series South Park. It originally aired on October 27, 1999. The episode is themed around Halloween and includes a parody of the animated series Scooby-Doo (with the band Korn filling the role of Mystery, Inc.).

== Plot ==
Local radio station KOZY 102.1 is sponsoring a "Halloween Haunt" featuring an appearance by real-life nu metal band Korn. Priest Maxi is unhappy about both and conducts a one-man protest campaign, calling Halloween an abomination of God and Korn Satanists that play violent music. Stan Marsh, Kyle Broflovski, and Kenny McCormick are excited about Halloween, but Eric Cartman is already thinking about Christmas because he expects to be showered with presents. They visit various mediocre attractions and get frightened by a gang of fifth-graders who play a prank on them involving pirate ghosts. Stan decides to retaliate by digging up Kyle's recently buried grandmother, Cleo Broflovski, and scaring the fifth-graders with it. Kyle, while uneasy about the scheme, reluctantly agrees to go along.

Meanwhile, Korn, driving in a van which resembles the Mystery Machine, crash it after spotting pirate ghosts on the road. After digging up Cleo's corpse, the boys leave it barely concealed at the harbor, where it is promptly eaten by a stray dog. During the night, they meet Korn (and a Scooby-Doo-like character, Nibblet) after their encounter with the pirate ghosts. The following morning, the graveyard's watchmen inform Mrs. Broflovski about the missing corpse, and describe to her in graphic detail what the culprit, who they assume to be a necrophiliac, might be doing to the corpse.

Cartman intercepts a life-sized blow-up Antonio Banderas sex doll ordered by his mother, which he mistakenly assumes to be a Christmas present for him, and takes it around town to show off. The boys return to the docks in their costumes hoping to win the contest for best costume, with Kenny wearing an elaborate costume of the ED-209 robot from RoboCop. To Kenny's disappointment, everyone (including Korn) is able to clearly recognize him. At the town square, the grave watchers are explaining the concept of necrophilia very explicitly until the Pirate Ghosts show up and terrorize the town. A few citizens are blown up and one ghost decapitates two others. Priest Maxi shows up and blames Korn for causing all this trouble. The town gets angry and set up a lynch mob to get rid of the "devil worshipers".

Korn and the boys go investigate the "Mystery of the Pirate Ghosts and the missing body". After a few mishaps typical of Scooby-Doo episodes, it is revealed that Priest Maxi was behind the Pirate Ghosts, which he simply conjured up with rather impossible light tricks and sounds (the explanation to some of the citizen's deaths earlier caused by the Pirate Ghosts is left unsolved and unknown). The mystery of Cleo Broflovski's missing corpse is solved when the dog regurgitates the body. The Halloween Haunt goes as planned, with Korn debuting "Falling Away from Me" which shocks the crowd, as their cheery personality in the episode is a strong contrast to the song. The boys get their revenge against the fifth-graders while Korn is playing, scaring them with the corpse and Cartman's Antonio Banderas doll gets popped by Nibblet. Kenny's spectacular ED-209 costume does not win him first prize, which goes instead to Wendy Testaburger wearing the same Chewbacca costume as in the previous first-season Halloween special "Pinkeye". During the closing credits, Kenny ends up getting killed by miniature Snowspeeders (à la The Empire Strikes Back) while inside his costume and rats arrive to eat his body.

== Cultural references ==
The band Korn is portrayed as Scooby-Doo-style mystery solvers, while many aspects of the plot parody the show. The band takes the role usually portrayed by the Harlem Globetrotters on Scooby-Doo. The argument over whether they were "pirate ghosts" or "ghost pirates" was an argument the creators had during the writing of the show. Kenny's costume is of the "ED-209" from the film RoboCop, coincidentally, in RoboCop, the executive who dies during the ED-209 demonstration is named Kinney, but in English his name is pronounced "Kenny". The use of the band's "Korn Powers" is likely a combination parody of the activation of the Wonder Twins Exorian powers, and the transformation sequence into the character Knightron from Tattooed Teenage Alien Fighters from Beverly Hills.

== Critical reception ==
DVD Verdict wrote "Korn's appearance in the Halloween show is expertly handled, as is the whole Hanna-Barbera animation send-up", and gave the episode a rating of 90. Writing 15 years after the episode aired, Ryan Book of The Music Times, called it the "single greatest South Park episode of all time."
