= Mr. Mackey =

South Park character

- South Park character
- First appearance: "Mr. Hankey, the Christmas Poo" (1997)
- Created by: Trey Parker; Matt Stone
- Designed by: Trey Parker; Matt Stone
- Voiced by: Trey Parker

In-universe information
- Alias: Fireman Tom
- Gender: Male
- Occupation: ICE agent, Janitor, South Park Elementary school counselor (formerly)
- Family: Mrs. Mackey Sr. (mother); Mr. Mackey Sr. (father; deceased)
- Significant others: Diane Choksondik (girlfriend; deceased)
- Residence: South Park, Colorado, United States

Mr. Mackey Jr. is a fictional character in the adult animated television series South Park. He is voiced by series co-creator Trey Parker and debuted in the season one episode "Mr. Hankey, the Christmas Poo". The school counselor at South Park Elementary, he is best known for saying "m'kay" at the end (or beginning) of most of his sentences.

Mr. Mackey is based on Parker's junior high school counselor Stan Lackey.

== Appearance ==
Mackey has a disproportionately large head, which is caused by the tightness of his tie. He wears a green long-sleeved shirt, a blue tie, dark blue pants, and blue leather shoes, as well as black-rimmed glasses. He speaks with a Southern accent. Mackey has black yet thinning hair.

== Character biography ==
Mackey is the school counselor at South Park Elementary, and occasionally teaches classes at the school. Judging from the episode "Insheeption", Mackey was most likely born in 1965, making him a member of Generation X. This is supported by the many 1980's references that are made involving Mackey during the episode "Back to the Cold War", such as Mackey's childhood bedroom, the WarGames parody, as well as Mackey dancing to Wang Chung's "Dance Hall Days" during a duck and cover drill at the elementary school. This is also supported by the episode "Taming Strange", in which popular 1980s music plays from Mackey's computer on the school intercom while trying to use the new Intellilink system, such as Lionel Richie's "All Night Long (All Night)" and Glenn Frey's "The Heat Is On" from the Beverly Hills Cop soundtrack.

Mackey taught sex education with Ms. Choksondik, with whom he had a sexual relationship until her death. Following this, he took over the fourth-grade class until Mr. Garrison returned. In "Ike's Wee Wee", Mackey taught Mr. Garrison's class about drugs, smoking, and alcohol. He was fired after marijuana he passed out to the students was stolen by Mr. Garrison. He was consequently evicted by his landlord, which caused him to fall into depression and take drugs himself.

Mackey holds generally left-wing political views, as he protested against the Iraq War in the season seven episode "I'm a Little Bit Country". However, in the season twelve episode About Last Night, he was shown as a supporter of John McCain's presidential campaign in 2008 and was shown upset that he lost. He also signed up to I.C.E. in "Got a Nut",

It was presumed that in "Proper Condom Use", the last time Mackey had sex was 21 years ago (when he mentions he was 19). In the episodes "Something You Can Do with Your Finger" and "Cat Orgy" it was hinted there were bondage sex scenes with Liane Cartman, where in the former episode, Eric Cartman watches a tape of Mackey and Liane, where he becomes her sex slave, and drinks from a cup of her urine, while the latter episode shows Mackey flirting with Liane.

In "Insheeption" it was revealed that Mackey is a hoarder because of his troubled childhood when he was a fourth-grader in 1974. He was shown to be bullied by other children and was a fan of Woodsy Owl, but at the end of a field trip, the owl molested him. Later in the episode, he threatened to rape Stan Marsh in the mouth if the latter threw any of the clutter in Mackey's office away.

Mackey was shown in "Trapped in the Closet" as a member of the Church of Scientology, though no later episodes mention this. He is fluent in Spanish, as shown in "Rainforest Shmainforest".

Unlike many of the major adult characters, his first name is currently unknown.

== See also ==
- South Park (Park County, Colorado)
- South Park City
