= Gerald and Sheila Broflovski =

Fictional characters

- South Park characters
- Gerald (left) and Sheila (right)
- First appearance: "Mr. Hankey, the Christmas Poo" (Gerald); "Death" (Sheila)
- Created by: Trey Parker; Matt Stone
- Designed by: Trey Parker; Matt Stone
- Voiced by: Gerald: Matt Stone; Sheila: Mary Kay Bergman (1997–1999); Mona Marshall (1999–present)

In-universe information
- Aliases: S-WOW Tittybang (Sheila); Skankhunt42 (Gerald); Jerry (Gerald)
- Occupation: Sheila: Activist; Gerald: Lawyer
- Children: Kyle Broflovski (son); Ike Broflovski (adoptive son)
- Relatives: Kyle Schwartz (nephew): Sheila: Cleo Broflovski (mother); Gerald: Murrey Broflovski (brother)
- Religion: Judaism
- Origin: South Park, Colorado; San Francisco, California (in "Smug Alert!"); Newark, New Jersey (Former home of Sheila)
- Nationality: American

Gerald Broflovski and Sheila Broflovski are fictional characters in the animated television series South Park. The two are an Ashkenazi Jewish couple who raise their ten-year-old son Kyle and three-year-old Canadian-born adopted son Ike in the fictional town of South Park, Colorado.

In tradition with the show's animation style, they are both composed of simple geometrical shapes, and are animated with use of a computer, though they are given the impression of being construction paper cutout compositions animated through the use of stop motion, which was the technique used to animate the "Spirit of Christmas" shorts and the show's first episode. Gerald is voiced by series co-creator Matt Stone and Sheila was originally voiced by Mary Kay Bergman and is currently voiced by Mona Marshall. Their first names are derived from those of Stone's parents, Gerald and Sheila Stone. However, unlike his mother, Stone's father is not Jewish, and Gerald Broflovski was not largely based on him.

== Characters ==
Though they are named for Stone's parents, Gerald and Sheila's characters are not largely inspired by the couple. While Stone's mother is Jewish, his father is a gentile of Irish descent, and Stone says they raised him in an agnostic household. Stone decided to portray the character of Gerald as recognizably Jewish, stating that doing so "creates more opportunity for comedy". Gerald grew up in South Park, and met Sheila while they attended college. The two moved back to Gerald's hometown when Kyle was younger because Sheila wanted to raise her children in a small town environment, but in "Smug Alert!", the Broflovskis briefly moved to San Francisco when Gerald felt that South Park wasn't "progressive" enough. In a few instances, Sheila indicated displeasure with Gerald's indulgent and hypocritical behaviour, and Gerald occasionally displays subdued annoyance with his wife's meddling in others' lives. However, their marriage has been portrayed as more stable than those of the other prominent adult couples in the series, and the couple once overcame a temporary setback in their sex life when Gerald briefly suffered from erectile dysfunction.

Gerald and Sheila share a strong devotion to their Jewish faith, while expressing deep concern on the multiple occasions Kyle's faith in Judaism becomes enervated; However, in earlier episodes the couple has been portrayed attending the Catholic church in South Park. The couple tend to showcase liberal viewpoints, having protested the 2003 invasion of Iraq and supported Barack Obama during the 2008 presidential race.

=== Gerald ===
Gerald is a lawyer who also serves on South Park's council as the city attorney, and his role in this profession has been put on display in episodes such as "Sexual Harassment Panda" and "Chef Goes Nanners" in which a trial or legal issue plays a large part in the plot. He commonly wears an olive-green jacket over a purple shirt and forest green trousers. White briefs are Gerald's underpants of choice. He sports a contemporary beard and separated mustache, and is almost always seen donning a pink yarmulke. When not wearing the yarmulke, Gerald is shown to have male-pattern baldness. He is a generally kind, amiable person, though at intervals he has been shown to assume a snobbish attitude that disaffects his friends and family. Examples include the episode "Chickenpox" where it is revealed that he used to be close with Stuart McCormick when they were younger but that the two had a falling out due to economic differences or when he begins acting like an arrogant snob after buying a hybrid car in "Smug Alert!". In "Sexual Harassment Panda", Gerald repeatedly sued South Park Elementary (which was faultless in every case), and later every citizen of South Park, showing his shameless monetary greed and disregard for civil propriety. Gerald was once seen to have a repressed gambling problem, and prior struggles with a fictional form of inhalant abuse known within the show as "cheesing". Gerald is, in season 20 of the show, revealed to be an internet troll. His internet alias is 'Skankhunt42', and initially, everyone thinks that Eric Cartman is, in fact, Skankhunt42. When trolling, he makes provocative statements against women, and, most notably, creates images where he "puts a dick in [women's] mouths." He always drinks red wine and listens to music by Boston when trolling. His antics eventually place him in the news after trolling a Danish olympian, making him one of the two main villains of the entirety of season twenty alongside Lennart Bedrager.

=== Sheila ===
Sheila made her first appearance in the season one episode "Death" (where she was originally named Carol), and she exhibits several traits commonly associated with those of a stereotypical Jewish mother. She wears her hair in a beehive, is overweight, and typically wears a midnight blue suit jacket over a light gray blouse, with a dark red skirt and gray stockings. She speaks with a Brooklyn accent, and appears to be of less-than-average height relative to the other female adults on the show. In the episode "It's a Jersey Thing", it is revealed that Sheila was originally from New Jersey, where she was known as "S-Wow Tittybang", and that she and Gerald moved to South Park to avoid having their newly conceived child grow up there. Apart from being briefly appointed to the fictional federal position of "Secretary of Offense" under the Clinton Administration, Sheila is a stay-at-home mother. As a result of hearing something shocking or inappropriate, she is often heard exclaiming "WHAT, WHAT, WHAT!?", saying each word in rapid succession and putting more emphasis on the last "what". Sheila has been depicted as being a huge fan of Barbra Streisand.

In earlier seasons, Sheila often spearheaded public opposition to things she deemed harmful to children or to the Jewish community. She led a group to New York City to protest Terrance and Phillip, a Canadian comedy duo whose television show's toilet humor is what she believed to be a negative influence on Kyle. Her outrage escalated in South Park: Bigger, Longer & Uncut when she further protested Terrance and Phillip by forming "Mothers Against Canada", which eventually instigated a war between Canada and the United States making her one of the main villains of the film. At the climax of the film, she takes her crusade against the duo to the extreme by fatally shooting Terrance and Phillip; despite her son's protests, which fulfills an apocalyptic prophecy allowing Satan, his minions, and his lover Saddam Hussein to invade the Earth. This aspect has been toned down in recent years, and is more or less completely absent from newer episodes. Her relationship with Gerald varies, in the episode "Spontaneous Combustion" it is shown that Gerald suffers from periodic sexual dysfunction and erectile dysfunction which put a strain on their relationship. In "Insecurity", she and her husband used sexual roleplay to have better sex.

Upon seeing Kyle taking part in a school play which involved a nativity scene, Sheila pleads with the mayor to ban the use of any religious imagery within the town that could perceived as offensive to those of different beliefs. In addition to her ethnicity, Eric Cartman also despises Sheila's activism, which he perceives as an attempt to inhibit anyone's ability to have fun. Cartman has even expressed his hatred for Sheila by singing a song entitled "Kyle's Mom's a Bitch" in "Mr. Hankey, the Christmas Poo" and South Park: Bigger, Longer & Uncut.

== Family ==
Although Sheila is inclined to be overprotective of her sons, she and Gerald tend to be caring and loving of both Kyle and Ike, with Sheila often referring to the boys with Yiddish terms of endearment. The couple often try to strengthen the bond between their two sons, and encourage Kyle to accept and love Ike as though they were biological brothers. The two also accompany Ike during activities that enrich his status as a child prodigy, such as sitting with him as he read two John Steinbeck novels in one day. Gerald is mostly seen as a responsible and caring father, and often attempts to teach Kyle important morals, though sometimes to a fault. Thinking he would delight Kyle by making more money, Gerald instead distressed his son by increasing the family's income at the expense of bankrupting the local elementary school. Gerald also alienated Kyle (and several other townsfolk) when, as one of the very few hybrid vehicle owners in South Park, he became increasingly self-righteous. Despite these isolated incidents, Kyle usually holds a high opinion of Gerald. Sheila is often unaware of the overwhelming effect her protests has on Kyle until Kyle gains enough courage to confront her and tell her that her actions are not the proper way to be a mother figure in his life. Kyle tends to show that he truly loves Sheila, and takes offense to any insult Cartman may offer about her.

Sheila has a deceased mother named Cleo (who also shares Gerald's surname of Broflovski) who is frequently mentioned on the show. She was seen (albeit as a corpse) in the episode "Korn's Groovy Pirate Ghost Mystery" when Kyle reluctantly allowed his friends to exhume her body so that they could use it in a Halloween prank. Sheila also has a nephew named Kyle (her sister's son) who is another of the show's embodiment of Jewish stereotypes. Aside from his wife and sons, none of Gerald's relatives have made a major appearance on the show. However his brother, Murrey Broflovski, featured in the episode Ike’s Weewee briefly.
