= Pam Brady =

American screenwriter and producer

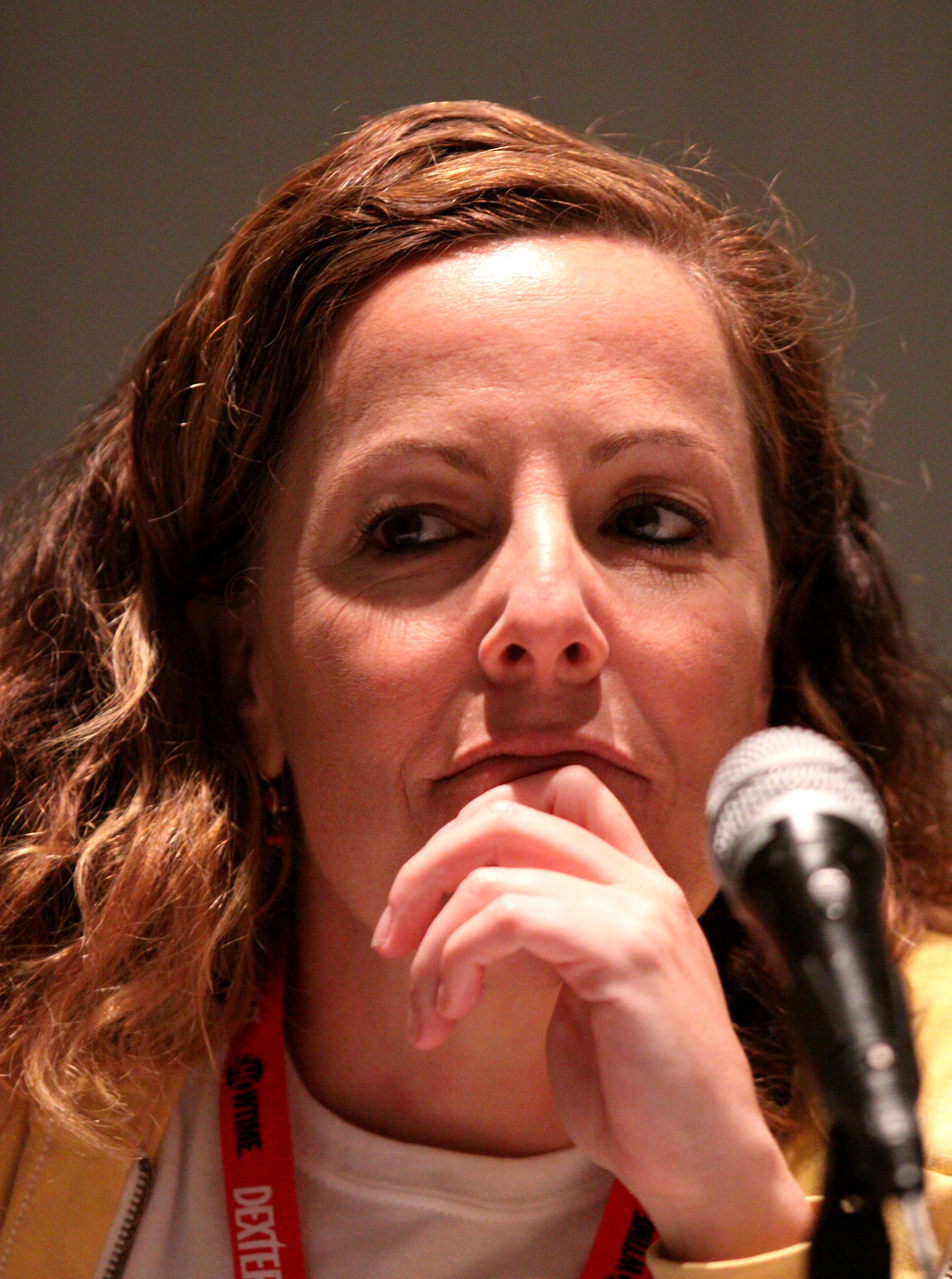
- Brady in July 2010
- Born: United States
- Occupations: Screenwriter; producer
- Known for: South Park; Lady Dynamite; Hamlet 2; Hot Rod; The Loop; Mr. Wong

Pam Brady is an American screenwriter and producer. She frequently collaborates with Trey Parker and Matt Stone.

== Career ==
Brady first met Parker, Stone, and Jason McHugh while working under Brian Graden at the Fox Broadcasting Company. Brady suggested that the duo make a weekly version of their student film Cannibal! The Musical. The three came up with the idea for Time Warped. While Time Warped went unproduced, Parker and Stone decided to make South Park for Comedy Central and brought Brady on as a writer.

Brady was the live-action fiancée of Mr. Adler in the third season episode "Tweek vs. Craig". After leaving the show in the fourth season to write films and co-create the short-lived series The Loop, she later co-wrote Team America: World Police and has occasionally produced or consulted on episodes of the series.

Brady wrote and directed the horror-inspired animated TV series Neighbors from Hell, which premiered in June 2010 on TBS. Brady began collaborating with Arrested Development creator Mitch Hurwitz to create a television show starring Maria Bamford. The series, Lady Dynamite, was released on Netflix on May 20, 2016.

Brady co-created alongside Ramy Youssef #1 Happy Family USA produced by A24 for Amazon Prime Video.

== Writing credits ==
=== Television ===
- The John Larroquette Show (1993)
- South Park (1997–1999)
- Just Shoot Me! (1999–2000)
- Mr. Wong (2000) (also co-creator)
- Go Fish (2001) (also developer)
- The Loop (2006–2007) (also co-creator)
- Neighbors from Hell (2010) (also creator)
- Lady Dynamite (2016–2017) (also co-creator)
- #1 Happy Family USA (2025) (also co-creator)

=== Film ===
- South Park: Bigger, Longer & Uncut (1999) – with Trey Parker and Matt Stone
- Team America: World Police (2004) – with Parker and Stone
- Hot Rod (2007)
- Hamlet 2 (2008) – with Andrew Fleming
- The Bubble (2022) – with Judd Apatow
- Ruby Gillman, Teenage Kraken (2023) – with Brian C. Brown and Elliott DiGuiseppi
- Smurfs (2025)
- The SpongeBob Movie: Search for SquarePants (2025) - with Matt Lieberman (also producer)
