= Eric Stough =

American animator and producer (born 1972)

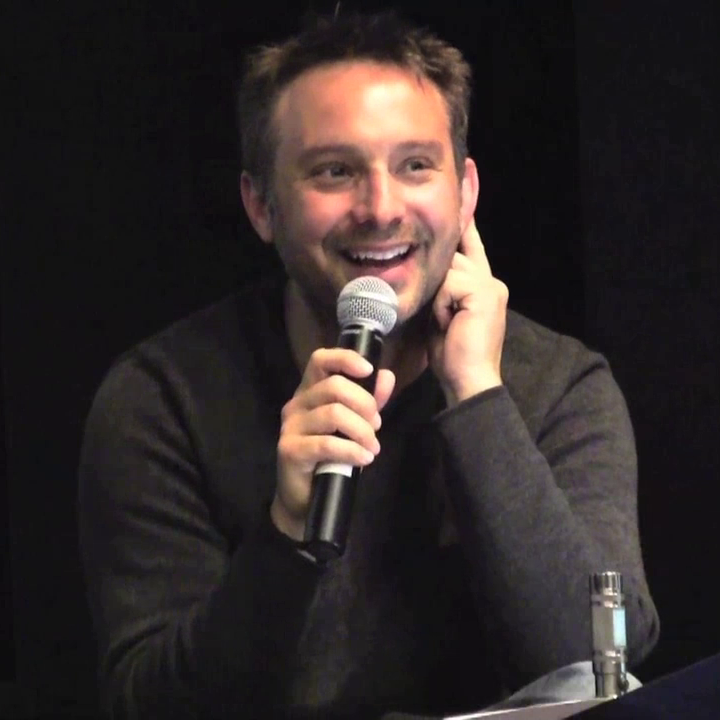
- Stough in 2013
- Born: Evergreen, Colorado, U.S.
- Other name: Butters
- Education: Evergreen High School, University of Colorado at Boulder (BFA)
- Occupations: Television producer; animation director
- Years active: 1995–present

Eric "Butters" Stough (/ˈstaʊ/, rhymes with 'cow') is an American animator and producer. He is best known as the animation director and a producer on the television series South Park. Born in Evergreen, Colorado, Stough attended the University of Colorado at Boulder and graduated in 1995 with a degree in film. A longtime friend of Trey Parker, he has worked with him and Matt Stone on most of their projects, including South Park, South Park: Bigger, Longer & Uncut, Orgazmo, Team America: World Police and the Broadway musical The Book of Mormon.

Stough has won five Primetime Emmy Awards for his work on South Park, as well as a Peabody Award. He was the inspiration for the character of Butters Stotch on South Park.

== Life and career ==
Stough was born in Evergreen, Colorado, and has characterized his upbringing as "well-rounded, sheltered and I did what I was told." He met Trey Parker at age 13; the two later acted in school musicals and made short films together at Evergreen High School. Stough grew up interested in animation and aspired to be a "great Disney animator", but was not the best at drawing. He attended the University of Colorado at Boulder (UCB), where he initially studied in their art department. Parker convinced him to instead join their film department, as he would be able to make animated films rather than spend his time perfecting his drawing. He had an internship with Jim Henson Productions in college.

He graduated with a film degree in 1995, and subsequently worked with Parker and Matt Stone on the short film The Spirit of Christmas (1995). The film grew popular and resulted in a television deal with Comedy Central to produce an animated series based on it, which became South Park. Stough was the first crew member hired on South Park, which premiered in 1997, and remains the show's producer and animation director. He has also worked on various South Park-related projects, including the show's theatrical film and the video game The Stick of Truth, as well as Orgazmo, Team America: World Police and the Broadway hit The Book of Mormon, which he illustrated for.

The character of Butters Stotch in South Park is based on Stough and his sheltered upbringing. He noted in his commencement address for UCB in 2014, "The nickname 'Butters' stems from little brother, little buddy and innocent wholesome person." Stough has also provided the un-muffled voice of Kenny McCormick in four episodes of the show, "The Jeffersons," "Lice Capades," "Mysterion Rises" and "Turd Burglars". He did not, however, provide the main voice of Kenny's alter-ego Mysterion.

== Awards ==
Stough has been nominated for 14 Emmy Awards and has won five for South Park in "Outstanding Animated Program" category, as well as a Peabody Award. He also won awards for his short film Revenge of the Roadkill Rabbit at the 2000 Athens International Film and Video Festival. At the 2014 National Academy of Video Game Trade Reviewers (NAVGTR) awards, Stough was credited (along with Bruce Howell and Adrien Beard) for the Game of the Year nomination.

== Filmography ==
=== Film ===
Year	Title	Role	Notes
1993	Cannibal! The Musical	Production assistant	
1997	Orgazmo	Arrestee	
1999	South Park: Bigger, Longer & Uncut	Animation director	
1999	Revenge of the Roadkill Rabbit	Director, executive producer	Short film
2004	Team America: World Police	Additional animation	
2010	The People vs. George Lucas	Himself	Documentary film
2011	6 Days to Air: The Making of South Park	Himself	TV documentary film
2021	South Park: Post Covid	Producer	TV film
2021	South Park: Post Covid: The Return of Covid	Producer	TV film
2022	South Park: The Streaming Wars	Producer	TV film
2022	South Park: The Streaming Wars Part 2	Producer	TV film
2023	South Park: Joining the Panderverse	Producer	TV film
2023	South Park (Not Suitable for Children)	Producer	TV film
2024	South Park: The End of Obesity	Producer	TV film

=== Television ===
Year	Title	Role	Notes
1997–present	South Park	Producer, animation director	Also provides the "un-muffled" voice of Kenny McCormick.

=== Video games ===
Year	Title	Role	Notes
2017	South Park: The Fractured but Whole	Producer	
