= Stan Marsh =

Fictional character in the animated television series South Park

- South Park character
- First appearance: Jesus vs. Frosty (1992) (short)
- Created by: Trey Parker; Matt Stone
- Based on: Trey Parker
- Designed by: Trey Parker; Matt Stone
- Voiced by: Trey Parker

In-universe information
- Full name: Stanley Marsh
- Aliases: Toolshed; Billy; Raven; Stan (Stanley shortened); Ranger Stan Marshwalker
- Gender: Male
- Occupation: Former paperboy, student, online whiskey consultant (South Park: Post COVID), Chief Master Sergeant at United States Space Force (revised future in South Park: Post COVID: The Return of COVID)
- Family: Randy Marsh (father); Sharon Marsh (mother); Shelley Marsh (sister); Sparky (pet dog)
- Significant others: Wendy Testaburger (on-again, off-again girlfriend; lovers in the revised Future)
- Relatives: Marvin Marsh (paternal grandfather); Grandma Marsh (paternal grandmother); Jimbo Kern (maternal uncle); Flo Kimble (maternal grandaunt; deceased)
- Religion: Roman Catholic
- Nationality: American
- Residence: 260 Avenue de los Mexicanos, South Park, Colorado, United States

Stanley Marsh is a fictional character in the adult animated television sitcom South Park, created by Trey Parker and Matt Stone. He is voiced by and loosely based on series co-creator Trey Parker. Stan is one of the series' four central characters, along with Kyle Broflovski, Eric Cartman, and Kenny McCormick. He debuted on television when South Park first aired on August 13, 1997 with the episode "Cartman Gets an Anal Probe", after having first appeared in The Spirit of Christmas shorts created by Parker and long-time collaborator Matt Stone in 1992 (Jesus vs. Frosty) and 1995 (Jesus vs. Santa).

Stan is an elementary school student who commonly has extraordinary experiences not typical of conventional small-town life in his fictional hometown of South Park, Colorado. Stan is generally depicted as logical, brave, patient and sensitive. He is outspoken in expressing his distinct lack of esteem for adults and their influences, as adult South Park residents rarely make use of their critical faculties.

Like the other South Park characters, Stan is animated by computer in a way to emulate the show's original method of cutout animation. While Parker and Stone portray Stan as having common childlike tendencies, his dialogue is often intended to reflect stances and views on more adult-oriented issues and has been frequently cited in numerous publications by experts in the fields of politics, religion, popular culture and philosophy.

== Role in South Park ==
Prior to season 22, and again since season 28, Stan lives in South Park with his parents Randy and Sharon Marsh and his sister Shelly. From season 22 until “Sickofancy”, the family lives at a farm on the outskirts of town called Tegridy Farms, where Randy raises marijuana and forces his reluctant family to assist him. Stan's family includes his 13-year-old sister Shelly, who in early seasons bullied and beat him, and his centenarian grandfather. Stan attends South Park Elementary as part of Mr. Garrison's fourth-grade class. During the show's first 58 episodes (1997 through the season 4 episode "4th Grade" in 2000), Stan and the other main child characters were in the third grade. Stan is frequently embarrassed and annoyed by his father's antics and frequent acts of public drunkenness. Stan's relationship to his uncle Jimbo received moderate attention in the show's first two seasons.

Stan was originally the everyman, described as "a normal, average, American, mixed-up kid" and quickly became a "2000's loser" type. In season fifteen, the show shifted to more complex characterization and Stan became cynical and depressed due to his dysfunctional family.

Stan is modeled after Parker, while Kyle is modeled after Stone. Stan and Kyle are best friends, and their relationship, first intended to reflect the real-life friendship between Parker and Stone, became extremely close as they grew older. This is a common topic throughout the series. Stan is frequently at odds with his friend Cartman, resenting Cartman's behavior and openly mocking his weight. Stan shares a close friendship with Kenny and can understand his muffled voice. Stan also typically exclaims the catchphrase "Oh my God! They killed Kenny!" following one of Kenny's trademark deaths.

Stan is the only character in the group to have had a steady girlfriend, Wendy Testaburger, and their relationship was a recurring topic in the show's earlier seasons. Despite reconciling and declaring to be a couple again in season 11, their relationship seems to have been less formally defined as a couple.

== Character ==
=== Creation and design ===
Stan's hair, which is usually hidden underneath his hat

An unnamed precursor to Stan first appeared in the first The Spirit of Christmas short called Jesus vs. Frosty, created by Parker and Stone in 1992. The character was composed of construction paper cutouts and animated through the use of stop motion. When asked three years later by friend Brian Graden to create another short as a video Christmas card that he could send to friends, Parker and Stone created another similarly animated The Spirit of Christmas short, dubbed Jesus vs. Santa, in which Stan also appeared. Stan next appeared on August 13, 1997, when South Park debuted on Comedy Central with the episode "Cartman Gets an Anal Probe".

In the tradition of the show's animation style, Stan is composed of simple geometrical shapes and primary colors. He is not offered the same free range of motion associated with hand-drawn characters; his character is mostly shown from only one angle, and his movements are animated in an intentionally jerky fashion. Since the show's third episode, "Weight Gain 4000", Stan and all characters on the show have been animated with computer software, though portrayed to give the impression that the show still utilizes its original technique.

Stan is usually depicted in winter attire consisting of a brown jacket, blue jeans, red gloves/mittens, and a red-brimmed blue knit cap adorned with a decorative red pom-pom. When shown without a cap, Stan is styled with shaggy black hair. He shares his surname of "Marsh" with Parker's paternal step-grandfather. Stan's birthday is October 19, which is also Parker's birthday.

Parker developed Stan's voice while he and Stone were in film class, where they would speak in high-pitched childish voices: they would reuse these voices when South Park debuted. While originally voicing Stan without any computer manipulation, Parker now speaks within his normal vocal range while adding a childlike inflection. The recorded audio is then edited with Pro Tools, and the pitch is altered to make the voice sound more like that of a 10-year-old.

=== Personality and traits ===
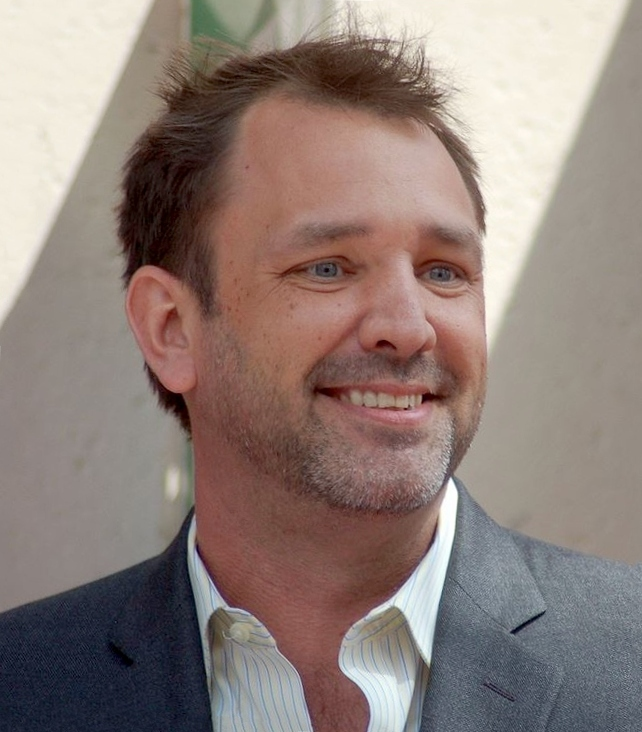
Stan is modeled after his voice actor, series co-creator Trey Parker.

Stan is foul-mouthed as a means for Parker and Stone to display how they claim young boys really talk when they are alone. While Stan is cynical and profane, Parker still notes that there is an "underlying sweetness" to the character, and Time magazine described Stan and his friends as "sometimes cruel but with a core of innocence". Stan is amused by bodily functions and toilet humor, and his favorite television personalities are Terrance and Phillip, a Canadian duo whose comedy routines on their show-within-the-show revolve substantially around fart jokes.

Stan is an avid animal lover. He is highly against his uncle Jimbo's hunting, and was also known to commit to vegetarianism after feeling compassion for baby calves in a farm. He was forced to quit vegetarianism because of a severe illness he developed, but still fights for animal rights.

Through the history of South Park to date, the only adult on the show that Stan liked was Chef. He generally holds the rest of the show's adult population in low regard because of their tendency to behave irrationally when subjected to scams, cults, and sensationalized media stories, and engage in hypocritical behavior. He doubts the legitimacy of holistic medicine, declares cults to be dangerous, and regards those claiming to be psychic mediums as frauds.

Stan became extremely cynical after his 10th birthday and lost interest in many things that he once enjoyed. Stan's friendships with the other main characters ended, his parents divorced, and he moved out of his home. This episode formed a cliffhanger and set off widespread speculation that the series was coming to an end. The premiere of the second half of the episode resolved the arc, as Stan was erroneously diagnosed with Asperger's syndrome, and discovers Jameson Irish Whiskey cures cynicism. After struggling to repair his life, he finally explains he does not want things to go back to normal, when his parents get back together and his life is repaired. Although the end of the episode implies Stan may be permanently bound to whiskey to continue an everyday life.

== Cultural impact ==
Stan being presented as the reincarnation of L. Ron Hubbard in the season nine episode "Trapped in the Closet"

In 2014, Stan was ranked by IGN at third place on their list of "The Top 25 South Park Characters", commenting that he "often acts as the voice of reason in the midst of the show's insane events, and in many ways he's more mature than his father Randy". The website concluded that "his history as one of the more stable and thoughtful characters in the series made him the perfect choice for the voice of Trey and Matt's own creative/professional frustrations".

Stan frequently offers his perspective on religion, and he was at the center of one of the most controversial episodes of the series, "Trapped in the Closet" (season nine, 2005), where he was recognized as the reincarnation of Scientology founder L. Ron Hubbard before denouncing the church as nothing more than "a big fat global scam".

Stan has addressed topics such as homosexuality, hate crime legislation, civil liberties, parenting, illegal immigration, voting, alcoholism, and race relations. His commentary on these issues has been interpreted as statements Parker and Stone are attempting to make to the viewing public, and these opinions have been subject to much critical analysis in the media and literary world. The book South Park and Philosophy: You Know, I Learned Something Today includes an essay in which East Carolina University philosophy professor Henry Jacoby compares Stan's actions and reasoning within the show to the philosophical teachings of William Kingdon Clifford, and another essay by Southern Illinois University philosophy professor John S. Gray which references Stan's decision to not vote for either candidate for a school mascot in the season eight (2004) episode "Douche and Turd" when describing political philosophy and the claimed pitfalls of a two-party system. Essays in the books South Park and Philosophy: Bigger, Longer, and More Penetrating, Blame Canada! South Park and Contemporary Culture, and Taking South Park Seriously have also analyzed Stan's perspectives within the framework of popular philosophical, theological, and political concepts.
