= Whale Whores =

- South Park episode
- Episode no.: Season 13; Episode 11
- Directed by: Trey Parker
- Written by: Trey Parker
- Production code: 1311
- Original air date: October 28, 2009

Episode chronology
| ← Previous "W.T.F." | Next → "The F Word" |
- South Park season 13

"Whale Whores" is the eleventh episode of the thirteenth season of the American animated television series South Park. The 192nd overall episode of the series, it aired on Comedy Central in the United States on October 28, 2009. In the episode, Stan joins an anti-whaling crew in order to save dolphins and whales from Japanese whalers.

The episode was written and directed by series co-creator Trey Parker, and was rated TV-MA LV in the United States. "Whale Whores" addressed the topic of Japanese whaling, condemning the whalers. The episode is particularly critical of the reality television series Whale Wars and its star Paul Watson, an environmental activist who is prominently featured in "Whale Whores".

In a response to the episode, Paul Watson said he was not offended by the portrayal, and was glad the show brought the issue of illegal whaling to a large audience. The episode also featured references to the show Deadliest Catch and a rendition of the Lady Gaga song "Poker Face" sung by Eric Cartman (Trey Parker) on the game Rock Band. A downloadable version of the song was released for the game in March. "Whale Whores" was released on DVD and Blu-ray along with the rest of the thirteenth season on March 16, 2010. The episode was nominated for a Genesis Award, but lost to the Family Guy episode "Dog Gone".

== Plot ==
The Marsh family is spending Stan's ninth birthday at a public aquarium in Denver. As the Marshes enjoy interacting with the trained bottlenose dolphins, Japanese armed with spears suddenly storm the dolphinarium and kill all the dolphins. The Japanese perform similar attacks at several other aquariums, slaughtering orcas and whales, as well as at an NFL game, where they kill members of the Miami Dolphins football team. Stan asks his friends Kyle, Cartman, and Kenny to help him take on the cause of saving the dolphins and whales from the Japanese. Kyle declines, feeling they can't change Japan's views on the issue, while Cartman and Kenny are much more interested in playing the video game Rock Band, professing they "don't give two shits about stupid-ass whales and dolphins". Eventually, Butters (who is also too busy) informs Stan about the television show Whale Wars, stating that they can take volunteers to help them. Seeing this as his chance, Stan takes Butters' advice and joins host Paul Watson and his crew aboard the Sea Shepherd, but is underwhelmed by their method of throwing "stinky butter" at Japanese whalers in an effort to deter them. After the Japanese whalers kill Watson with a harpoon, Stan destroys their ship by igniting their fuel barrels with a flare gun. Stan becomes the new captain and leads a more successful campaign in impeding the Japanese whaling effort by employing more aggressive methods. The crew ends up getting interviewed by Larry King, who describes Paul Watson as an "incompetent media whore" and questions Stan on his intentions of increasing ratings with violence. Stan dismisses the charge and contends he is only interested in saving the whales, not ratings.

Wanting to be on television, Cartman and Kenny join the ship's crew under false pretenses of wanting to save the whales (especially, in fact, since they are more interested in the fame and fortune). After a brief run-in with Captain Sig Hansen and his crew from the show Deadliest Catch, Japanese pilots launch kamikaze attacks on the Sea Shepherd. The suicidal planes kill the Whale Wars crew except for Stan, Cartman and Kenny. The trio are captured and brought to Japan, where Emperor Akihito tells them retaliation for the bombing of Hiroshima is the primary motive for Japan's whaling efforts, with Cartman finding the whole nuclear drop and mass devastation hilarious. He shows them a doctored photograph—given to Japan by the United States after the bombing—of the Enola Gay piloted by a dolphin and a killer whale. According to him, Japan was so grateful the Americans gave the Japanese these photos they declared peace. Knowing the picture is a fake, Stan decides to reveal the truth about the bombing, but Cartman reminds him that the Japanese seek to drive the entire species of the perpetrators to extinction. Realizing the truth could start another war between Japan and the United States, Stan claims the U.S. government has authorized him to show the "original" photo, and presents the Emperor, Prime Minister Yukio Hatoyama, and other Japanese officials with a new doctored photo showing a cow and chicken in the Enola Gay (created by Kyle, who Stan managed to phone beforehand). The Japanese become infuriated, now believing cows and chickens had modified the original photo to frame the innocent whales and dolphins as scapegoats. The Japanese agree to cease their whaling efforts and start slaughtering cows and chickens, storming farms full of the animals. The episode ends as Randy congratulates Stan for making the Japanese "normal, like us".

== Theme ==
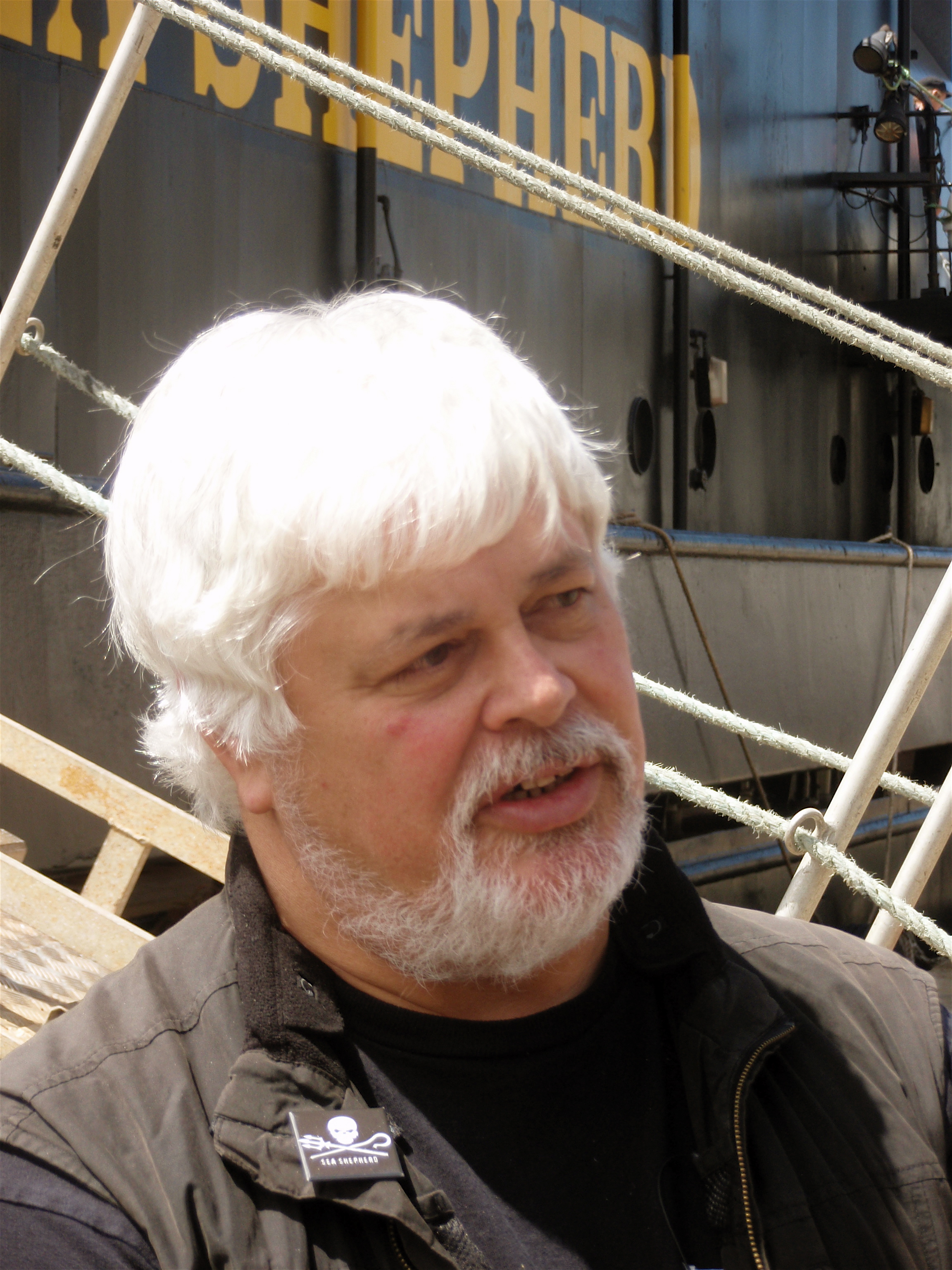
Paul Watson (pictured), environmental activist and star of the reality series Whale Wars, is parodied in "Whale Whores"

"Whale Whores" addresses the controversies surrounding Japanese whaling, which had been a subject of considerable media attention around the time the South Park episode first aired. The episode condemns all sides involved in the matter, including the Japanese whalers themselves and the activists who fight against them. By having the Japanese attack the dolphins at the Denver Aquarium in the middle of a dolphin riding demonstration, it has been suggested the episode highlights the link between visiting dolphins at marine parks and the reality of how aquatic wildlife are captured and slaughtered. In the final scene, the show also draws parallel between the Japanese whaling industry and the generally accepted meat and poultry industries.

However, the episode prominently features and mocks animal rights and environmental activist Paul Watson and his Animal Planet reality series, Whale Wars. Watson has received wide criticism for his method of disrupting whale hunts by at times attacking and sinking Japanese and Norwegian whaling ships. "Whale Whores" presents Watson and his show in a way that mocks his attempts to garner media attention by simply lying rather than doing anything productive. The episode mocks Whale Wars and its attempts to present mundane ship-board activities as dramatic television. This is particularly illustrated in newspaper headlines after Stan takes over Watson's ship: "New Captain Turns Vegan Pussies Into Real Pirates" and "Whale Wars Gets Better: Things Actually Happen!" Watson himself is also portrayed in a physically unflattering way, with his stomach too fat to be entirely covered by his shirt. "Whale Whores" also refers to the criticisms that Watson bends the truth in order to further his popularity. This is particularly reflected through the fictional interview with Larry King, who calls Watson "an unorganized, incompetent media whore who thought lying to everyone was OK as long as it served his cause". The fact that Whale Wars gets better ratings after Stan takes over and employs more violent tactics is a satire of the tendency in Whale Wars, and television in general, to exploit violence for money and viewership.

== Cultural references ==
The atomic bombings of Hiroshima and Nagasaki are identified as the cause of Japanese whaling. The two Japanese cities were destroyed by atomic weapons during the final stages of World War II under orders by U.S. President Harry Truman, which killed about 220,000 people. In "Whale Whores", the Japanese are presented with a doctored picture of the Enola Gay, the B-29 Superfortress bomber that dropped the atomic bomb on Hiroshima. The picture shows a dolphin and an American orca piloting the plane to bomb the city. The Miami Dolphins, a National Football League professional football team, are killed along with real dolphins by the whalers in "Whale Whores". Near the end of the episode, Stan and the crew of the MY Steve Irwin encounter fishing ship captain Sig Hansen and his crew from the Discovery Channel reality series, Deadliest Catch. The scene with Paul Watson's crew throwing "stinky butter" at the whalers refers to Watson and his crew's practice of throwing stink bombs containing butyric acid, an acid found in rancid butter and cheese, at Japanese whaling vessels, including the factory vessel, the Nisshin Maru.

An Entertainment Weekly magazine cover is shown with the headline, "We're STILL Remembering Michael Jackson", a reference to the extremely large amount of media coverage surrounding the then-recent death of pop singer Michael Jackson. During one scene, Stan frightens off a group of Japanese whalers by uncovering a large statue of Godzilla, the famous Japanese movie monster. During the episode Kyle, Kenny and Cartman are shown performing Lady Gaga's song "Poker Face" on the video game Rock Band. On March 16, 2010, Rock Band developer Harmonix released this version of the song (along with the original version) as downloadable content for the game series.

== Reception ==
"Whale Whores" was controversial and received mixed reviews. Ken Tucker of Entertainment Weekly described the criticism of the save-the-whales conservationists as a "delightfully savage ridicule". Brian Jacks of MTV complimented the show's focus on whale conservation, writing, "Leave it to the hard-hitting folks at South Park to do more for conservationism than fifteen cable reality shows put together." Josh Modell of The A.V. Club's said the episode was unfunny and mocked a television series that was "culturally insignificant" and not particularly well-known. Modell wrote, "The show's star, Paul Watson, seems to have really pissed off South Park's creators Parker and Stone [...] Fine, but could you make me laugh a few times while you beat me over the head with information about a guy that I couldn't care less about?"

Ramsey Isler of IGN called "Whale Whores" an entertaining episode, but said the episode could have provided more meaningful satire and did not explain the whaling issue very well, especially considering the show's target audience was probably unfamiliar with it. Isler praised some of the individual jokes revolving around the Japanese attacks, and called Cartman's "Poker Face" rendition a classic South Park moment, but dismissed the Enola Gay twist as "stupid". Carlos Delgado of iF Magazine said "South Park swung and missed" with "Whale Whores". Delgado said many of the jokes were random and "weird", particularly the Enola Gay twist and the Japanese kamikaze attacks.

Paul Watson said he was not offended by his portrayal in the episode, and was glad "Whale Whores" brought the issue of dolphin and whale slaughter to a large audience, as well as the role of the Japanese in the deaths. Watson said, "It's a tough situation we are in. We can't hurt the whalers and we have to stay within the boundaries of the law in opposing illegal whaling operations. If that makes us pussies, so be it. It's better than being portrayed as killers." Watson said the episode failed to portray that his actions have hurt Japanese profits from whaling, but that the episode demonstrated how successful Whale Wars and the Sea Shepherd has been.

In February 2010, "Whale Whores" was nominated for a Genesis Award in the television comedy category. The Genesis Awards pay tribute to news and entertainment media for outstanding work that raise public understanding of animal issues. "Whale Whores" ultimately lost to the Family Guy episode "Dog Gone".

== Home media ==
"Whale Whores", along with the thirteen other episodes from South Park's thirteenth season, were released on a three-disc DVD set and two-disc Blu-ray set in the United States on March 16, 2010. The sets included brief audio commentaries by Parker and Stone for each episode, a collection of deleted scenes, and a special mini-feature Inside Xbox: A Behind-the-Scenes Tour of South Park Studios, which discussed the process behind animating the show with Inside Xbox host Major Nelson.
