= PE =

PE may refer to:

== Science and technology ==
=== Computing and telecommunication ===
- P/E cycle of flash memory
- Phase encoding, another name for Manchester code
- Portable Executable, a computer file format
- Windows Preinstallation Environment, a lightweight version of Microsoft Windows
- Progressive enhancement, a strategy for web design
- Protocol encryption, a feature of some peer-to-peer file-sharing clients
- Provider edge router, a router between computer networks
- Project Euler, a problem solving website

=== Medical conditions ===
- Pectus excavatum, a structural deformity of the anterior thoracic wall in which the sternum and rib cage are shaped abnormally
- Pre-eclampsia, a disorder of pregnancy
- Premature ejaculation
- Pulmonary embolism, a blockage of the pulmonary artery

=== Medical interventions ===
- Penis enlargement
- Phenylephrine, a common over-the-counter decongestant
- Phenytoin equivalent, used to measure doses of fosphenytoin
- Physical exercise
- Prolonged exposure therapy, a form of behavior therapy designed to treat posttraumatic stress disorder

=== Organic chemistry ===
- Pentaerythritol, a polyol
- Phenylephrine, a common over-the-counter decongestant
- Phenytoin equivalent, used to measure doses of fosphenytoin
- Phosphatidyl ethanolamine
- Phycoerythrin, a water-soluble protein used as a fluorescent marker in microscopy and flow cytometry
- Polyethylene, a common plastic polymer

=== Physics ===
- Positron emission, a type of radioactive decay
- Potential energy, the energy stored in a body or in a system due to its position in a force field or due to its configuration
- Proton emission, a type of radioactive decay
- Protective earth, a type of electrical protective system
- Reduction potential, the negative logarithm of electron activity

=== Other uses in science and technology ===
- AEG PE, a German World War I armored ground-attack aircraft
- Population equivalent, a concept used in sanitary engineering
- Present Era, a year numbering system commonly used in archaeology that uses 1950s as the epoch marker
- Professional Engineer, a post-nominal suffix indicating such a certification
- Primary energy, an energy form found in nature that has not been subjected to any human engineered conversion process
- A US Navy hull classification symbol: Patrol escort (PE)

== Arts and media ==
- "P.E." (Cow and Chicken), a 1998 television episode
- Parasite Eve (video game), on the original PlayStation
- Pineapple Express (film), a 2008 American action-comedy film starring Seth Rogen
- Power electronics (music), a type of noise music
- The Press-Enterprise, a newspaper serving the Inland Empire in Southern California
- Private eye, a character class in the MMORPG Neocron
- Public Enemy (group), a hip hop group from Long Island, New York
- Minecraft: Pocket Edition, the mobile version of the video game

== In business and economics ==
- P/E ratio, or price-to-earnings ratio
- Performance Evaluation, a journal
- Professional Engineer, a post-nominal suffix indicating such a certification
- Private equity, equity investments in companies that are not traded on a public stock exchange
- Permanent establishment, a fixed place of business establishing taxable presence of a business in a host country

== Businesses and organizations ==
- Air Europe Italy (IATA Code 1989–2008)
- People Express Airlines (1980s) (IATA Code 1981–1987)
- Pacific Electric, a defunct Los Angeles rail transit company
- PerkinElmer, an American technology company
- Army Police (Brazil), (Portuguese: Polícia do Exército) a Brazilian Army Police force
- Army Police (Portugal), (Portuguese: Polícia do Exército) a Portuguese Army Police force

== Places ==
- PE postcode area, UK, covering Peterborough
- Pernambuco, a state of Brazil
- Peru (ISO 3166-1 alpha-2 and NATO country code PE)
- Gqeberha, formerly known as Port Elizabeth, a city in South Africa
- Prince Edward Island, a Canadian province

== Other uses ==
- Pakistani English, the variant of English language spoken in Pakistan
- Physical education
- Princess Elizabeth Challenge Cup, a rowing event at Henley Royal Regatta

== See also ==
- Pe (disambiguation)
- Pee (disambiguation)
