= Dances with Smurfs =

- South Park episode
- Episode no.: Season 13; Episode 13
- Directed by: Trey Parker
- Written by: Trey Parker
- Production code: 1313
- Original air date: November 11, 2009

Episode chronology
← Previous "The F Word"	Next → "Pee"
- South Park season 13

"Dances with Smurfs" is the thirteenth episode of the thirteenth season of the American animated television series South Park. The 194th overall episode of the series, it originally aired on Comedy Central in the United States on November 11, 2009. In the episode, Eric Cartman becomes the reader of the elementary school announcements, and starts making politically charged accusations against student body president Wendy Testaburger. The episode was written and directed by series co-creator Trey Parker, and was rated TV-MA L in the United States.

"Dances with Smurfs" serves as a parody of the political commentary style of Glenn Beck, a nationally syndicated radio show host and former Fox News Channel pundit. The episode also satirizes the then-upcoming 20th Century Fox/James Cameron film Avatar, suggesting the plot of that film borrows heavily from the 1990 Orion Pictures/Kevin Costner film Dances with Wolves in that they both follow indigenous tribes being invaded by colonizers, and comparing the Na'vi from Avatar to the cartoon Smurfs due to both having blue skin. It also includes references to the Tea Party protests, radio personality Casey Kasem, and former vice presidential candidate Sarah Palin.

The episode received generally positive reviews. According to Nielsen ratings, "Dances with Smurfs" was seen by 1.47 million households among viewers aged between 18 and 34.

== Plot ==
Gordon Stoltski, a third grader who reads the South Park Elementary morning announcements, is shot dead in a murder-suicide by a deranged jealous husband mistaking him for a truck driver with a similar name who had an affair with his wife, which the entire school hears due to it being heard over the intercom. During a memorial service at the gymnasium, guidance counselor Mr. Mackey announces the school will seek a replacement. Eric Cartman gets the job after sabotaging the efforts of a student named Casey Miller. However, during his first announcement, Cartman is very critical of the school and makes politically-charged accusations against student body president, Wendy Testaburger.

Principal Victoria asks Cartman to stick to the script during announcements, but he accuses her of trying to silence him, and brings in the A.C.L.U. to ensure his freedom of speech. Cartman's announcements are soon broadcast as the politically themed "EC" show on televisions placed in each classroom. On his set's chalkboard, he uses the first letters of an acronym to make keywords that he writes to spell out Wendy's intent to "kill Smurfs" which concerns Butters Stotch and some other students. When they confront Wendy, she states that she does not care about Smurfs, which further enrages the boys.

Cartman starts selling copies of his book, What Happened to My School?, outside the cafeteria where Stan Marsh confronts him. Angry because of Cartman's outrageous sexual lies about Wendy in his book, Stan tries to convince Cartman to stop selling the books to no avail. Stan then goes to Principal Victoria and Mr. Mackey again, who confront Cartman, and force him to stop selling his books on school grounds. This upsets Cartman, who accuses them of turning the school into a "socialist horror-land", and insists he is leaving the school. The next day, however, he appears on his show and spins a portrayal of himself in blue face-paint and suspenders, having somehow found Smurfland, becoming part of Smurf culture and eventually falling in love with Smurfette. Cartman then claims that Wendy bulldozed Smurfland and slaughtered the Smurfs to get their valuable Smurfberries, the complete story of which he has chronicled in his DVD docudrama titled Dances with Smurfs. While it is obvious that the footage of Wendy was really of Cartman in disguise, Butters Stotch and a furious mob of students go to Wendy's house to confront her. Butters pees on her front door and demands that she go on Cartman's morning announcements show to answer his questions.

On the "EC" set the next morning a reluctant Wendy joins Cartman (who has his sideburns dyed gray in make-up) who promises he will stick to school-related questions and go easy on her. However, as soon as filming begins, he immediately asks about her rumored promiscuity and involvement in the Smurf genocide. To Cartman's surprise, Wendy claims she indeed bulldozed Smurfland to get the valuable Smurfberries, but alludes that Cartman was involved with the plot, and that the Smurfs would have left Smurfland if Cartman had not integrated himself with them. She steps down as student body president, turning the title over to Cartman, and announces her own new book Going Rogue on the Smurfs. Cartman is angry that she has turned the tables on him and stolen his Smurf idea, particularly when she announces she sold the movie rights to filmmaker James Cameron, who turned the book into his new film, Avatar. When serving as the student body president, Cartman cannot do the morning announcements anymore because a student cannot hold both positions at the same time. Cartman is also angered when learning that being the student body president involves less power and more council meetings than he previously believed. The episode ends with Casey Miller reading the announcements, which include a student's letter of disgust for Cartman's performance as president, causing him to run out the room crying, "I'm doing the best I can!"

== Production ==
"Dances with Smurfs" was written and directed by series co-founder Trey Parker, and was rated TV-MA L in the United States. It first aired on November 11, 2009, in the United States on Comedy Central. The episode marked the final appearance of Gordon Stoltski, the third grade student who read the morning announcements for South Park Elementary. The day after "Dances with Smurfs" was originally broadcast, four T-shirts based on the episode were made available at South Park Studios, the official South Park website. All four featured Cartman wearing a suit and tie, saying a quote from the episode. These included "I'm not some dog on a leash", "We're in the poop box, my friends", "I'm a normal kid... I just ask questions", and "I ask questions".

== Theme ==
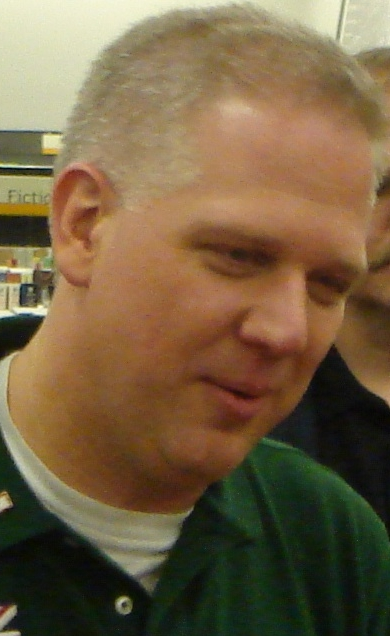
Political pundit Glenn Beck (pictured) and his commentary style were heavily satirized in "Dances with Smurfs"

"Dances with Smurfs" served as a parody and social commentary of the political commentary style of Glenn Beck, a nationally syndicated radio show host and former Fox News Channel political pundit.

Cartman's televised morning announcements are patterned after the Glenn Beck Program, using the same types of music and imagery, as well as a logo with the initials "EC" that closely resemble the logo of Beck's show, which use the initials "GB". Cartman also writes comments about Wendy on a blackboard, which is a prop often used by Beck on his television program. The day after "Dances with Smurfs" originally aired, Beck himself discussed the episode on his radio program. Beck said he had not watched the episode himself but took the parody as a compliment, and that he particularly enjoyed Cartman's hair, which was combed in a style similar to Beck. Steve "Stu" Burguiere, the executive producer of Beck's radio show, also complimented the episode, and said of Parker and Stone, "These guys skewer everybody and they are always very good at it".

== Cultural references ==
"Dances with Smurfs" satirized Avatar, the 2009 science-fiction epic film directed by James Cameron, which tells the story of humans in the distant future mining for minerals on an alien planet inhabited by blue natives called the Na'vi. Although Avatar had not yet been released in theaters by the time the episode aired, the script of "Dances with Smurfs" compares the plot of Avatar to that of Dances with Wolves, a 1990 drama epic film in which a United States soldier becomes integrated with a tribe of Native Americans. At the end of "Dances with Smurfs", Cartman watches Avatar at a movie theater and grows angry that his idea was stolen, expressing the idea that Avatar borrows from other previous films. Avatar had already been compared to Dances with Wolves prior to the broadcast of "Dances with Smurfs", and James Cameron said he welcomed the comparison. Cartman's movie prominently features the Smurfs, a fictional group of small blue cartoon creatures, which draws a further parallel to the blue alien creatures in Avatar. On the commentary Trey Parker and Matt Stone described the Na'vi who are natives of Pandora in Avatar as "ten foot tall sexy Smurfs".

When Wendy resigns as student body president, she announces the publication of her book, Going Rogue on the Smurfs. This is a reference to Going Rogue, the 2009 autobiography of former United States Vice Presidential candidate Sarah Palin, who had recently announced her resignation as Governor of Alaska. Casey Miller, the student who competes against Cartman for the morning announcements, heavily resembles and speaks in a manner similar to radio personality Casey Kasem.

== Reception ==
Dances With Smurfs" had a few brilliantly funny moments, but overall the humor wasn't of the laugh out loud, milk coming out of your nose humor. It was smart comedy for those politically savvy viewers out there. Or fans of Smurfs. Your choice.

— Carlos Delgado
iF magazine

In its original American broadcast on November 11, 2009, "Dances with Smurfs" was watched by 1.47 million overall households among viewers aged between 18 and 34, according to Nielsen ratings. It ranked behind a special 90-minute episode of Sons of Anarchy, the FX series about an outlaw motorcycle club, which was the most watched cable program of the week with 2.5 million households among 18–49 viewers. In total viewers, it was watched by 2.77 million total viewers and for viewers aged between 18 and 49, it earned a 1.5/4 A18-49 rating/share.

The episode received generally positive reviews. Ramsey Isler of IGN said Cartman worked well for a Beck satire, and said, "The real accomplishment of this episode is how it totally roasted a semi-political figure, without being political at all." However, Isler said the script loses focus with the appearance of the Smurfs, and that Gordon's death was disturbing and inappropriate in the light of recent school shootings in the United States. The A.V. Club writer Sean O'Neal, a vocal critic of Beck, said mocking Beck is an easy task, but the episode "handled it with just enough of the show's usual surrealist bent that it was never wholly predictable". He praised some of the episode's unexpected elements, like Cartman's Smurf film and Wendy's surprise resignation. Carlos Delgado of iF magazine said "Dances with Smurfs" became "a little strange" starting with Cartman's Smurf story, but he called the episode "smart, sharp, and poignant". Delgado said the episode had less "laugh out loud" humor than traditional South Park episodes, in favor of intelligent satire. AOL Television writer Donald Deane called it one of the funniest episodes of the season.

== Home media ==
"Dances with Smurfs", along with the thirteen other episodes from South Park's thirteenth season, was released on a three-disc DVD set and two-disc Blu-ray set in the United States on March 16, 2010. The sets included brief audio commentaries by Parker and Stone for each episode, a collection of deleted scenes, and a special mini-feature Inside Xbox: A Behind-the-Scenes Tour of South Park Studios, which discussed the process behind animating the show with Inside Xbox host Major Nelson.
