= Butters' Bottom Bitch =

- South Park episode
- Episode no.: Season 13; Episode 9
- Directed by: Trey Parker
- Written by: Trey Parker
- Production code: 1309
- Original air date: October 14, 2009

Episode chronology
| ← Previous "Dead Celebrities" | Next → "W.T.F." |
- South Park season 13

"Butters' Bottom Bitch" is the ninth episode of the thirteenth season of the American animated television series South Park. The 190th overall episode of the series, it originally aired on Comedy Central in the United States on October 14, 2009. In the episode, Butters pays a girl $5 to give him his first kiss, which prompts Butters to start his own "kissing company" and eventually become a pimp.

The episode was written and directed by series co-creator Trey Parker. "Butters' Bottom Bitch" received particular attention for a scene in which Butters visited an ACORN office seeking benefits for his prostitutes, a reference to the real-life 2009 scandal. The episode received generally positive reviews and was seen by 2.56 million overall households, according to Nielsen Media Research. The episode was rated TV-MA-LS in the United States.

== Plot ==
Tired of being the only boy in his class to have never kissed a girl, Butters purchases his first kiss from Sally Darson, who sells kisses for $5. Having won the respect of his classmates, he devises a plan to advertise Sally's services to other unpopular boys at the school. Sally gives Butters a 40 percent cut for his advertising and managing services, and Butters soon turns the venture into a full-fledged "kissing company" by recruiting more girls to fill in during times in which Sally is busy. Upon learning about Butters' business, Kyle tells him that he is "nothing but a common pimp". Oblivious to what the word means, Butters attends a pimp convention where he seeks advice from more-experienced pimps, including one called Keyshawn. Afterward, he starts to mimic the pimp jargon, such as referring to Sally as his "bottom bitch", and incorporating "Do you know what I am saying?" into his conversations.

To combat the apparent rise in prostitution, Sergeant Yates of the Park County Police goes undercover (albeit poorly disguised) as a female prostitute named "Yolanda". During stings, to the bewilderment of the police, Yates waits until he is done engaging in actual sex acts with his male patrons before making an arrest. After he engages in group sex with numerous members of the fraternity house Alpha Tau Omega and doing business for Keyshawn, Yates' fellow officers begin to openly suggest to Yates that he is getting too carried away with his duties, as Yates now also has a pimp, Keyshawn.

Meanwhile, Butters' reputation as the respectful "new pimp" spreads throughout the county, prompting actual adult prostitutes to seek employment with him. He also starts holding onto all the money the company makes, since "bitches can't be trusted with it." Repulsed at what Butters is doing, Stan and Kyle try to persuade him to stop, but Butters ignores them, paying Clyde to keep Stan away from him, and brushing off Kyle's protests in an almost threatening manner. As his workforce expands, Butters starts offering health care and other benefits to his employees, attracting more and more adults. To this end, he visits the local ACORN office to apply for low-income housing benefits, seek mortgage loans, and inquire about the tax-status of his business. Butters is initially refused until he identifies the boss as a client of some of the real prostitutes working for Butters.

Sergeant Yates, still undercover, seeks employment with Butters. But Keyshawn soon appears outside and begs for "Yolanda" back, asking for her hand in marriage. Butters insists that he cannot force "Yolanda" to work for him, claiming it would interfere with the "true love" Keyshawn and "Yolanda" share. "Yolanda" accepts the proposal, and Butters decides to quit his job as a pimp. To the delight of his employees, he encourages them to function under the self-management of the company so they can keep whatever they earn for themselves. While "Yolanda" and Keyshawn are shown celebrating their first anniversary together in a small chalet in the mountains in Switzerland, Yates suddenly decides to spring his sting operation. Revealing his true identity, he pulls out his gun and badge and informs Keyshawn that he is under arrest.

== Production and cultural references ==
"Butters' Bottom Bitch" was written and directed by series co-creator Trey Parker. It first aired on October 14, 2009, in the United States on Comedy Central. The scene in which Butters visits the ACORN office seeking benefits for his prostitutes is a reference to the real-life 2009 scandal in which activist James O'Keefe secretly filmed himself posing as a pimp during meetings with ACORN employees. The scene generated the greatest amount of media attention for "Butters' Bottom Bitch" after its original broadcast. The pimp convention includes references to Pimps Up, Ho's Down, an HBO documentary about the pimping lifestyle, featuring real-life pimps. The scene in which the lieutenant calls his john a "nasty fucker" during sex, mirrored a scene from the documentary, Hookers at the Point.

The song that plays during the lieutenant's stripper scene at the fraternity party is "Fuck the Pain Away", by Peaches.

== Reception ==
In its original American broadcast on October 14, 2009, "Butters' Bottom Bitch" was watched by 2.56 million overall households, according to Nielsen ratings. It received a 1.7 rating/3 share, and a 1.3 rating/4 share among viewers aged between 18 and 49. In a surprise, South Park was outperformed in the 18 to 49 age group by the Bravo reality television series Top Chef, which was seen by 2.67 million viewers. "Butters' Bottom Bitch" also tied for the evening in the 18–49 rating with the Syfy reality television series Ghost Hunters (2.9 million household viewers) and only slightly outperformed the Discovery Channel popular science television program MythBusters (2.69 million household viewers), which surprised TV by the Number's Robert Seidman. "Butters' Bottom Bitch" was also outperformed by the Spike TV mixed martial arts competition series The Ultimate Fighter, which was watched by 2.82 million household viewers and had the highest cable ratings for the night in the 18 to 49 age group.

"It's mockery, lunacy, and all things zany. SOUTH PARK will always teeter on the verge of going too far, but hey, that's why we watch. SOUTH PARK is not about being timid. It's about taking risks, making episodes about topics most TV shows wouldn't touch. Prostitution may not be funny, but an episode about prostitution sure is. And maybe right there is where their genius lies."

— Carlos Delgado, iF Magazine

"Butters' Bottom Bitch" received generally positive reviews. Ramsey Isler of IGN gave the episode an 8.2 out of 10 rating. He said although it started slow, "once this episode found its legs, it was non-stop funny." Isler praised the South Park writers for coming up with a surprisingly funny plot, and said it ranked among Butters' best moments in the series. Carlos Delgado of iF Magazine said it was good to see an episode focused strictly on comedy, after a string of episodes focusing on social satire. Delgado said the premise of the episode was absurd and over-the-top, but appreciated that South Park was continuing to push boundaries by mocking such issues as prostitution.

The A.V. Club writer Josh Modell said the episode "was pretty damn funny, but I'm predisposed to Butters in general as well as the wide world of pimping." Wired writer Chris Kohler said the topical and timely jokes in "Butters' Bottom Bitch", such as the satire on ACORN, were a strong example of what kept South Park funny and relevant. Not all reviews were positive. Sean O'Neal, also of The A.V. Club, gave the episode a C grade, and said "It was basically one note held for the run of the ep, in service of a simple little story without many surprises." O'Neal said the subplot involving the police was "similarly repetitious", but he liked how the two plots came together to resolve each other.

== Home media ==
"Butters' Bottom Bitch", along with the thirteen other episodes from South Park's thirteenth season, were released on a three-disc DVD set and two-disc Blu-ray set in the United States on March 16, 2010. The sets included brief audio commentaries by Parker and Stone for each episode, a collection of deleted scenes, and a special mini-feature Inside Xbox: A Behind-the-Scenes Tour of South Park Studios, which discussed the process behind animating the show with Inside Xbox host Major Nelson.

The episode was also released on the two-disc DVD collection A Little Box of Butters.
