= The F Word (South Park) =

- South Park episode
- Episode no.: Season 13; Episode 12
- Directed by: Trey Parker
- Written by: Trey Parker
- Production code: 1312
- Original air date: November 4, 2009

Episode chronology
| ← Previous "Whale Whores" | Next → "Dances with Smurfs" |
- South Park season 13

"The F Word" is the twelfth episode of the thirteenth season of the American animated television series South Park. The 193rd overall episode of the series, it originally aired on Comedy Central in the United States on November 4, 2009. In the episode, the boys attempt to change the official definition of the word fag from an anti-homosexual slur to a term describing loud and obnoxious Harley bikers.

The episode was written and directed by series co-creator Trey Parker, and was rated TV-MA L in the United States. "The F Word" argues language is ever-changing and that taboo words only carry a stigma if society allows them to.

"The F Word" received generally mixed reviews, with commentators differing on the success behind the episode's underlying message. According to Nielsen ratings, "The F Word" was seen by 1.99 million households among viewers aged between 18 and 49, making it the highest-rated episode of the season, and surpassing the viewership of the NBC primetime comedy talk show, The Jay Leno Show.

== Plot ==
Kyle, Cartman, Stan, and Kenny enjoy a nice day outside with the weather being warm until a large group of Harley riders disturb them. The residents of South Park are equally frustrated when the group of Harley riders frequently make noise in town, while the Harley Riders erroneously believe that the stares and attention they get from the citizens are out of admiration. As the Harley riders eat lunch and talk about how nobody is paying attention to them, one of the Harley riders comes up with a noise to get everyone's attention. Before the Harley riders take off, Cartman confronts the bikers, explaining that everyone sees them as insecure losers who ride loud motorcycles to draw attention to themselves. Cartman tells them their attention-seeking behavior makes them look like pathetic "fags" and other children begin referring to the bikers with the same word. The bikers are upset and dismayed by this, but are unable to comprehend why the children don't think they and their motorcycles are cool, and assume they are being insulted because they are not being loud enough, as children are around loud stuff all the time in today's age. The motorcyclists equip their motorcycles with horns, sirens and various musical instruments. The boys devise a plan to rid the town of the bikers. However, once Butters reveals that he likes Harley motorcycles, he is not allowed to participate in the scheme. As the riders eat at a diner, Cartman defecates on the seats of their motorcycles while Kyle and Stan spray paint "FAGS GET OUT" on several buildings around town. The boys are pleased when the bikers temporarily leave town, but the graffiti alarms Big Gay Al and Mr. Slave. They interpret it as homophobia.

The boys readily admit to the spray painting, and explain to the city council that the word fag is not intended as an insult to homosexuals, and is being used only in reference to a contemptible person who rides a Harley motorcycle, or "an inconsiderate douchebag", as Stan puts it. They call upon the council to formally recognize this new usage. Support from the town, including the local gay community, results in a town ordinance declaring a change in the word's definition. However, this action leads to negative publicity as the rest of the nation refuses to acknowledge the change, and further angers the displaced bikers who refuse to be labeled as "fags". They look up the word in the dictionary and learn its definition has adapted over the years: it previously meant "an unpleasant old woman" and a bundle of sticks.

Upset by the national attention, Mayor McDaniels wants to resolve the situation, and the boys suggest getting the official dictionary definition updated. The town invites the English Dictionary Officiates, led by the head editor, former child actor Emmanuel Lewis, to review the proposal and consider making the definition change official. As the town celebrates the arrival of Lewis and the Officiates, the bikers suddenly crash the event and begin to riot. After inflicting damage to the town and scaring off the citizens, they corner the boys in an alley. The bikers demand they stop being called "fags", but the boys refuse to do so, asserting their behavior further justifies the application of the term. Butters steps between them and comes to the defense of the riders by expressing his admiration for the Harley-Davidson lifestyle. Confronted by gun-wielding gay residents led by Big Gay Al, the riders ultimately accept their new label, and Lewis is happy to declare the definition officially changed. The town rejoices and celebrates.

== Production ==
"The F Word" was written and directed by series co-founder Trey Parker, and was rated TV-MA L in the United States. It first aired on November 4, 2009, in the United States on Comedy Central. The day after "The F Word" was originally broadcast, T-shirts and hooded sweatshirts based on the episode were made available at South Park Studios, the official South Park website. It featured Butters standing in front of a motorcycle, standing above the word bike-curious?

== Theme ==
"The F Word" celebrates the fact that language is malleable and ever-changing, and that the idea of taboo words are only assigned their stigma because society allows them to become so. The word fag is used casually and extremely frequently by the characters throughout the episode.

Following the episode's original airing, the Gay & Lesbian Alliance Against Defamation (GLAAD) released a statement stating that "Though the writers of South Park attempted to craft a commentary on the shifting meaning of words, the fact of the matter is that the F-word is and remains a hateful slur...". In their statement, GLAAD emphasized that fag remains a charged and serious slur, even as the public increasingly uses it as a benign insult. Additionally, GLAAD said "The F Word" still reinforced the usage of the word fag as a means of insulting others, despite its altered meaning. GLAAD encouraged people to contact the show's creators and Comedy Central to share personal stories of the negative impact of hearing the slur in their life. Comedy Central initially stated that they "appreciated GLAAD's concerns", and a press representative stated that the network would speak further. On Nov. 6 they issued the following statement:

"South Park" is famous for tackling controversial subject matter in thoughtful and hilarious ways. This particular episode of the show has been both criticized and applauded within the gay and lesbian community. With all of that in mind, we will let this "South Park" episode speak for itself.

== Cultural references ==
"The F Word" makes prominent use of Harley-Davidson, the largest motorcycle manufacturing company in the United States. Also featured in the episode is Emmanuel Lewis, a former child actor who is portrayed as the head editor of the dictionary. This is a reference to Webster's Dictionary and Lewis' most famous role, the title character in the sitcom, Webster. During one scene, a television reporter repeatedly refers to a Harley biker as a fag until he attacks the camera. This is a reference to an on-air confrontation between NFL quarterback Jim Everett and sports talk show host Jim Rome, whom Everett attacked during a Talk2 interview.

In the scene where Emmanuel Lewis arrives at South Park, the music played by the orchestra is Pomp & Circumstance March No. 1 in D Major by Sir Edward Elgar.

In the scene where the Harley riders drive past the church, Father Maxi holds up a sign that says "God hates fags". This is a reference to Westboro Baptist Church, who frequently uses the phrase on signs at their protests.

== Reception ==
"When is South Park at its best? When it slaps you just hard enough to make you wince. And just when you're about to say something, either out of actual outrage or just social obligation, it follows that slap with an outright punch right in the face. "The F Word" may be one of those episodes."

— Carlos Delgado
iF magazine

"The F Word" was the highest-rated episode of the thirteenth season of South Park. The episode was seen by 1.99 million households in the subgroup of adults between the ages of 18 and 49. The episode earned a higher rating than that of The Jay Leno Show, a primetime late night talk show on NBC.

The episode received mixed reviews. Carlos Delgado of iF magazine said "The F Word" marks a return of South Park's tradition of tackling sensitive social issues with intelligent and politically incorrect writing, which Delgado said had been lacking in recent episodes. Delgado said "The F Word" served as a reminder that society is always changing and that although the thoughts or intentions behind words are harmful, the word itself is not. Ramsey Isler of IGN compared "The F Word" to "With Apologies to Jesse Jackson", an eleventh season episode that contained frequent use of the racial slur "nigger". However, Isler said "The F Word" was not as skillfully crafted as the "Jesse Jackson" episode and, although some moments were entertaining, the episode "had a habit of running some gags into the ground". James Hibberd, of The Live Feed, said he found the episode "well-intended and funny", and that it forced viewers to face a difficult issue and reexamine their beliefs about it. Hibberd wrote, "This is also, by the way, precisely what great art does". Genevieve Koski of The A.V. Club said the word fag has not lost its associations with homosexuals, so she did not believe in the episode's statements about the changing use of the word. Koski also called the episode "preachy", and said, "It took too long to get going, seemed confused about what its point was, and, most egregiously, had very few laughs."

"The F Word" was considered to be controversial by the gay community and its supporters, due to the excessive use of the word "fag" and "faggot". Gay rights group GLAAD issued a statement claiming, among other things, that "On Wednesday, November 4, Comedy Central aired a new episode of South Park entitled "The F-Word", in which the show's characters repeat the titular anti-gay slur countless times. Like many other South Park episodes that use controversial humor to provide commentary on current issues, last night's episode was an attempt to examine the evolving definition of words. Yet despite what the South Park writers may believe, the definition of the F-word remains one that is harmful and derogatory to the LGBT community."

== Home release ==
"The F Word", along with the thirteen other episodes from South Park's thirteenth season, were released on a three-disc DVD set and two-disc Blu-ray set in the United States on March 16, 2010. The sets included brief audio commentaries by Parker and Stone for each episode, a collection of deleted scenes, and a special mini-feature Inside Xbox: A Behind-the-Scenes Tour of South Park Studios, which discussed the process behind animating the show with Inside Xbox host Major Nelson.

== See also ==
- South Park (Park County, Colorado)
- South Park City
