= Fatbeard =

- South Park episode
- Episode no.: Season 13; Episode 7
- Directed by: Trey Parker
- Written by: Trey Parker
- Production code: 1307
- Original air date: April 22, 2009

Guest appearances
- Abdi Fatah Adawe; Dahir Ali; Abdullahi Prime; Sebastian Yu; Julien Zeitouni as the French Captain

Episode chronology
← Previous "Pinewood Derby"	Next → "Dead Celebrities"
- South Park season 13

"Fatbeard" is the seventh episode of the thirteenth season of the American animated television series South Park. The 188th overall episode of the series, it originally aired on Comedy Central in the United States on April 22, 2009. It was the mid-season finale, marking the final South Park episode for six months. In the episode, Cartman misinterprets news reports about piracy in the Indian Ocean on the coast of Somalia to mean the return of the classic era of swashbuckling pirates, and misleads a handful of South Park boys to voyage to Mogadishu to start a pirate crew.

The episode was written and directed by series co-creator Trey Parker, and was rated TV-MA L in the United States for strong to extreme language. "Fatbeard" was a reference to increasing international media attention to piracy in the Indian Ocean, and the script depicted the pirates in a sympathetic light. The crew of USS Bainbridge, an Arleigh Burke-class guided missile destroyer which participated in the rescue of the hijacked MV Maersk Alabama, contacted the South Park creators to praise them for the episode. "Fatbeard" received generally positive reviews and was seen by 2.59 million households in its original broadcast, making it the most-watched Comedy Central production the week it aired.

== Plot ==
Having misunderstood the news about an upsurge of piracy in the Indian Ocean, Cartman excitedly tells his friends the classic era of piracy has returned, and asks the boys to join him in becoming a pirate in what he describes as a responsibility-free life in a warm tropical paradise. Sensing an opportunity to get rid of Cartman once and for all, Kyle encourages him to go, even offering to help pay for his plane ticket. Although Butters, Ike, Clyde and Kevin are the only students who agree to join his crew (alongside Gordon, whom Cartman kicks out due to being ginger), an undaunted Cartman uses his mother's credit card to book a trip to Somalia via Expedia. After a long flight from Denver International Airport to Cairo and a 49-hour bus ride across Africa, the boys arrive in Mogadishu dressed as stereotypical pirates. Once there, however, they are shocked to find themselves in a desolate land, the complete opposite of their expectations.

They quickly find the pirates, who are shocked that anyone would knowingly venture into their base. The pirates decide to ransom the boys to the first European vessel they find, although Cartman and the boys do not understand because the pirates are speaking Somali. The boys confidently go with them, believing they are being taken to a pirate ship, but are once again disappointed when they are taken to a small motorboat. Eventually, the pirates find a French cruise ship and demand a ransom of five thousand euros in exchange for the boys' lives. Meanwhile in South Park, Kyle happily claims partial credit for sending Cartman to Somalia and expects things will be better without Cartman around. But when his parents discover a farewell letter from Ike, Kyle realizes his brother has run off with Cartman to Somalia, and he sets off for Mogadishu to bring his brother home. Back in Somalia, the ransom is paid and the boys are surrendered. Once on board, however, Cartman assumes control of the schooner and orders the crew to get onto the lifeboat. Although the captain initially refuses, Kevin brandishes a toy lightsaber, frightening the French crew into abandoning ship. Cartman and the boys return to Mogadishu with the captured vessel, giving several bundles of euros to the pirates. The pirates are initially shocked, but begin to respect Cartman. Unimpressed by their lack of "pirate" traits, he in turn leads them in raiding ships via a traditional sea shanty called "Somalian Pirates, We", and starts fashioning them into a stereotypical pirate crew.

Meanwhile, the French crew is rescued by an oil tanker, and the U.S. Navy is deployed by NATO and the United Nations after getting word from the cargo ship captain that the pirates now have "advanced weaponry" (which was really just Kevin's toy lightsaber, that the French crew thought was real). Kyle arrives in Mogadishu but is immediately taken captive by the pirates and held hostage. He pleads with Cartman to let him and his brother leave, but Cartman refuses, believing that Kyle is simply jealous of his new pirate life. Meanwhile, an English-speaking pirate named Guleed asks Butters and Ike why they decided to become pirates. When they say that they left because they were tired of things like school, chores, homework, and being yelled at by adults, Guleed responds by telling them that he does not want to be a pirate, and only became one because he is desperately poor: he dreamed of going to school and his mother was suffering from AIDS that could not be treated, while his father was killed attempting to find food for his family. Butters and Ike end up realizing how close-minded and complacent they have been and that a life of piracy is one of hardship and suffering rather than fun and adventure like normal life can be. They then tell Cartman that they want to return home, but he refuses to give up his delusions of grandeur and threatens the boys with death by calling the real pirates to hold them at gunpoint. However, Cartman's vision is quickly disrupted when a U.S. Navy ship hired by NATO appears off the coast carrying snipers, who kill all of the Somali pirates, with its commander stating 'do not hit the white ones' within seconds. This leaves Cartman dumbfounded and annoyed, as he quips, "The fuck?".

== Production ==
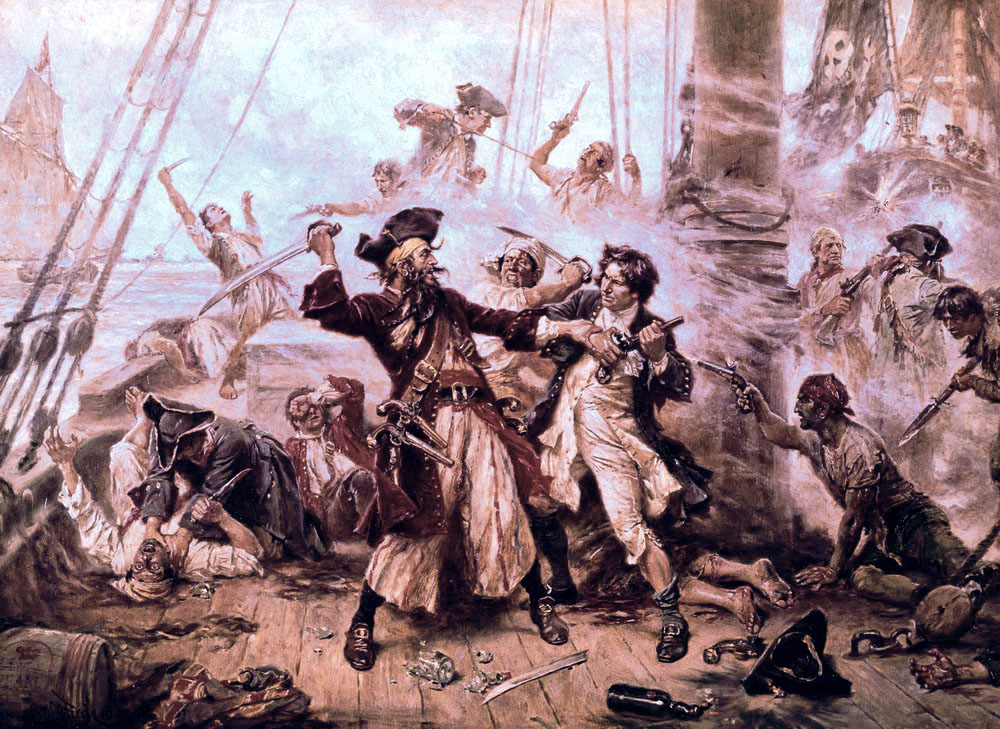
The episode alludes to the Golden Age of Piracy; its title is a reference to notorious pirate Blackbeard, depicted here.

"Fatbeard" was written and directed by series co-creator Trey Parker. It originally aired on Comedy Central in the United States on April 22, 2009 and was the mid-season finale, marking the final South Park episode until October 2009. "Fatbeard" is based on real-life piracy in the Indian Ocean, which began receiving increasing international media attention in 2008 until it ended in 2012/2013.

The episode began production two weeks before its airdate, with the intention to broadcast it on April 15, 2009. The writing team had developed the idea for Cartman mistaking Somali piracy for classic piracy amid the pirate hijacking of the MV Maersk Alabama at the time. Captain Richard Phillips was taken hostage in the event, and Parker and Stone decided to hold the episode indefinitely, although animation had begun. Realizing the severity of the situation — if Phillips were killed and the South Park episode seemed to mock the situation — they decided to resume work on the episode "Pinewood Derby", which had been in production for a while, as the creators had no idea to where to go with its story. When Phillips was rescued over the weekend, they wanted to resume work on "Fatbeard", but as animation work on the episode proved difficult, including new sets depicting Somalia, it was decided it would be unfeasible.

The episode's ending was unusual, as many episodes of South Park tend to resolve the episode's events; in "Fatbeard", the main characters don't return home and are shown at the end still in Somalia. An alternate ending made it to the animatic stage, in which Cartman, in a self-referential manner, congratulates the show on the conclusion of the season and invites the season's celebrity parodies (among those the Jonas Brothers and Kanye West). The ending, which Parker likened to that of a variety show, was something he felt was funny in writing but didn't succeed visually.

While most South Park episodes feature Parker and Stone providing almost all the voice acting, "Fatbeard" included several French-speaking actors providing the lines of the cruise ship crew. Outside voice actors were also brought in for the role of the Somali pirates, including Abdi Fatah Adawe, Dahir Ali, Abdullahi Prime, and Julien Zeitouni. The week after its original broadcast, in response to requests by fans, the full 90-second version of episode's sea shanty song, "Somalian Pirates, We" was made available for download on South Park Studios, the official South Park website. Shortly after "Fatbeard" was originally broadcast, the site also featured six different types of T-shirts and hooded sweatshirts based on the episode.

== Themes ==
The ending, in which the pirates are each shot to death by American snipers, reflects the resolution of the pirate hijacking of the MV Maersk Alabama in April 2009, where U.S. Navy SEALs rescued the captain after three snipers simultaneously killed three pirates with one shot each. They are portrayed in a particularly sympathetic light when they are killed during the ending. Travis Fickett of IGN said, "It's one of those moments where South Park feels the need to give voice to a side the media is ignoring—and points out that things aren't quite as cut and dry [sic] as we might like." The episode has also been described as a commentary on the way in which Americans tend to take their relative wealth and comfort for granted. A U.S. Navy SEAL ordering another to "not hit the white ones" has also been described as an indictment of the American approach to foreign policy.

== Cultural references ==
Ike indicates he will "puke my balls out through my mouth" if he has to hear anything more about Susan Boyle, the Scottish amateur singer who gained worldwide attention around the time of the episode's airing for her performance of the song "I Dreamed a Dream" from Les Misérables on the show Britain's Got Talent. The Boyle reference in particular received a great deal of media attention the week "Fatbeard" first aired. Cartman says that Jewish people, Mexicans, and ginger-haired people are not allowed to be pirates. The French schooner crew members are portrayed as pretentious cowards, a stereotype of the French based on the government's surrender during World War II. The schooner itself strongly resembles the French luxury yacht Le Ponant, which was seized by Somali pirates in April 2008. Cartman refers to Blackbeard, the famous English pirate from the 17th and 18th centuries, from whom the episode derives its name. Much of the décor and music in the episode is influenced by the Pirates of the Caribbean theme park ride and associated film franchise. Kevin wields a toy lightsaber, the Jedi weapon from the Star Wars films; this is also a reference to the sixth season episode "The Return of the Fellowship of the Ring to the Two Towers", in which he dresses as an Imperial stormtrooper while the rest of the boys are in The Lord of the Rings attire.

== Reception ==
In its original American broadcast, "Fatbeard" was watched by 2.59 million overall households, according to the Nielsen ratings, making it the most-watched Comedy Central production of the week. The episode received generally positive reviews. Carlos Delgado of If magazine, who gave the episode an A− grade, particularly praised the Cartman and Ike characters and called the ending "perfect". Delgado said of the show's creators, "These guys see episode potential in nearly everything that passes through the news desk. And because South Park can be made in like a week—and I’m talking start to finish, from concept to finished product—they end up being the most socially conscious and timely show on television today." Ken Tucker of Entertainment Weekly praised the episode and the Somali pirate song, and complimented the show for presenting the pirates as sympathetic human beings. Sean O'Neal of The A.V. Club said the portrayal of Somali pirates was a predictable storyline, but said he enjoyed the episode because of the pacing: "Rather than a cobbled-together collection of gags, everything progressed very organically." IGN writer Travis Fickett said the episode was amusing but not exceptional. Fickett enjoyed the takeover of the French vessel and the extent to which Cartman's delusion about pirates takes him, but he said the pirate plot "isn't entirely in good taste (and) it never really gathers a full head of steam".

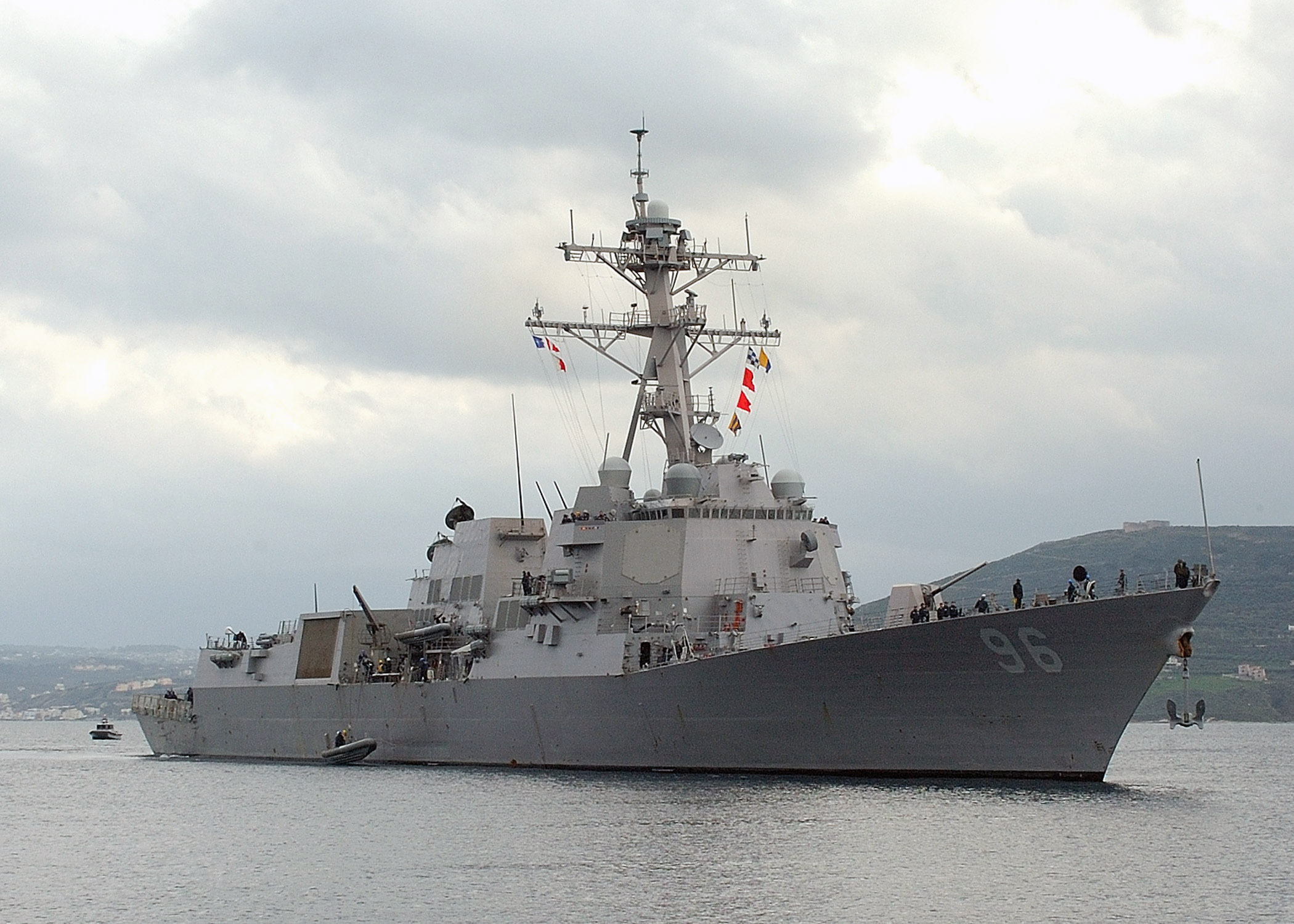
The crew of the Arleigh Burke-class destroyer USS Bainbridge (pictured) contacted the South Park staff to express their praise for the episode "Fatbeard".

The crew of the USS Bainbridge, the Arleigh Burke-class guided missile destroyer which participated in the rescue of Richard Phillips from the hijacked MV Maersk Alabama, contacted the creators of South Park to commend them on the episode. Ensign Jonathan Sieg, the Bainbridge public relations officer, wrote: "Pretty much everyone onboard our ship — from Captain to seaman — is a huge fan of South Park, and when we heard about the episode Fatbeard, as you can imagine, we were thrilled and very interested to watch." Sieg requested copies of the episode because the streaming online video was difficult to watch on the ship, and the South Park staff in return sent them a care package including several copies of the episode. On the official South Park Studios FAQ, they wrote back, "No, sir, thank you. We were honored to read that, and making an episode about you kicking pirate booty was our pleasure."

== Home release ==
"Fatbeard", along with the thirteen other episodes from South Park's thirteenth season, were released on a three-disc DVD set and two-disc Blu-ray set in the United States on March 16, 2010. The sets included brief audio commentaries by Parker and Stone for each episode, a collection of deleted scenes, and a special mini-feature Inside Xbox: A Behind-the-Scenes Tour of South Park Studios, which discussed the process behind animating the show with Inside Xbox host Major Nelson.
