= Dead Celebrities =

- South Park episode
- Episode no.: Season 13; Episode 8
- Directed by: Trey Parker
- Written by: Trey Parker
- Production code: 1308
- Original air date: October 7, 2009

Episode chronology
← Previous "Fatbeard"	Next → "Butters' Bottom Bitch"
- South Park season 13

"Dead Celebrities" is the eighth episode of the thirteenth season of the American animated television series South Park. The 189th overall episode of the series, it originally aired on Comedy Central in the United States on October 7, 2009. In the episode, Ike is haunted by the ghosts of dead celebrities who died in the Summer of 2009 until Michael Jackson, who does not want to admit that he is dead, possesses him.

The episode was written and directed by series co-creator Trey Parker, and was rated TV-MA L in the United States (specifically for adults, with coarse language). "Dead Celebrities" included references to several actors, singers and famous people who died before or in the middle of summer of 2009, when South Park was on a mid-season hiatus. Among the celebrities featured in the episode were Michael Jackson, Billy Mays, Ed McMahon, Farrah Fawcett, Patrick Swayze, Walter Cronkite, Dom DeLuise, Ted Kennedy, Natasha Richardson, Bea Arthur, David Carradine, DJ AM, Ricardo Montalbán, and Steve McNair. "Dead Celebrities" also parodied the films The Sixth Sense and Poltergeist.

The reality series Ghost Hunters and its stars, Jason Hawes and Grant Wilson, were mocked in the episode. Hawes and Wilson said they loved the parody and encouraged fans to watch the show on their Twitter accounts. A subplot claimed food at the Chipotle Mexican Grill resulted in customers defecating blood, a claim which was disputed by the restaurant chain within days of the episode's broadcast. "Dead Celebrities" received generally mixed reviews. According to Nielsen ratings, "Dead Celebrities" was seen by 2.67 million overall households.

== Plot ==
Ike is traumatized by his frequent encounters with the ghosts of celebrities who have died over the summer. He is haunted by people such as Farrah Fawcett, David Carradine, Ed McMahon, DJ AM, and especially Billy Mays, who repeatedly tries selling Ike products from the afterlife. Kyle is terrified when he finds out about the ghosts his brother is encountering and tells Stan, Cartman and Kenny about the encounters. An initially indifferent Cartman decides to help when Kyle mentions Billy Mays being one of the ghosts; Cartman then shows commercials that feature Mays on television, implying that he is an enthusiastic supporter of a product which Mays promoted while he was still alive, called "ChipotlAway", which cleans bloodstains from people's underwear caused by eating food from the Chipotle Mexican Grill. The boys call the team from the reality television series Ghost Hunters in to help, but they quickly, fearfully start ascribing supernatural meaning to random noises, before urinating and defecating on themselves, and finally running from the house. Eventually, Ike goes into a coma due to his multiple experiences with the ghosts, and is hospitalized.

At the hospital, the boys seek help from Dr. Philips, a medium (a parody of Zelda Rubinstein's character in Poltergeist), who explains the celebrities are trapped in purgatory, which she compares to being stuck on a plane that isn't quite ready to take off. Dr. Philips manages to contact the spirits and tell them that they have passed on. Surprisingly to her, the celebrities are all too acceptant of the fact, with CBS News anchorman Walter Cronkite and actor Patrick Swayze revealing their trapped state's cause to be Michael Jackson's refusal to acknowledge his death. Some of the celebrities help Dr. Philips and the boys try to convince Jackson that he is dead, but the latter keeps denying it and insists that people are ignorant and he is not only alive, but also a little white child. His denial is so strong that he emits a powerful force that kills Dr. Philips. The annoyed ghosts of these celebrities are shown in purgatory, which indeed does look like the interior of an airplane, minus the plane itself, complete with seats, flight attendants and pilot voice-over announcements.

After the energy disturbance, Jackson's spirit takes over Ike's body, causing Ike to sound and act like Jackson himself. The boys find from online research that the only way to make Jackson believe he is dead is to give him the acceptance he sought in life, so they take him to a child beauty pageant for young girls. Dressed like a little girl, Ike/Jackson impresses two of the male judges by singing a tune sounding similar to Jackson's "You Are Not Alone", but they are promptly arrested for masturbating while watching the children, leaving a single, unimpressed female judge (much to the shock of the boys, who were unaware of the men's lewd acts and considered them the best judges). When Cartman notices the judge eating Chipotle, he bribes her with knowledge about the ChipotlAway product, and she declares Ike/Jackson the winner as a result. Having found his acceptance, Jackson leaves Ike's body, and Ike is extremely surprised and disgusted to find himself dressed like a little girl.

Later on, Jackson and the other celebrities in purgatory are reunited and they are finally able to lift off. Initially happy, they are soon taken to Hell, and the flight attendant tells them that they must again wait as Hell is a tow-in gate and they are annoyed about their further delay to get to Hell rather than being in Hell in general.

== Production and theme ==
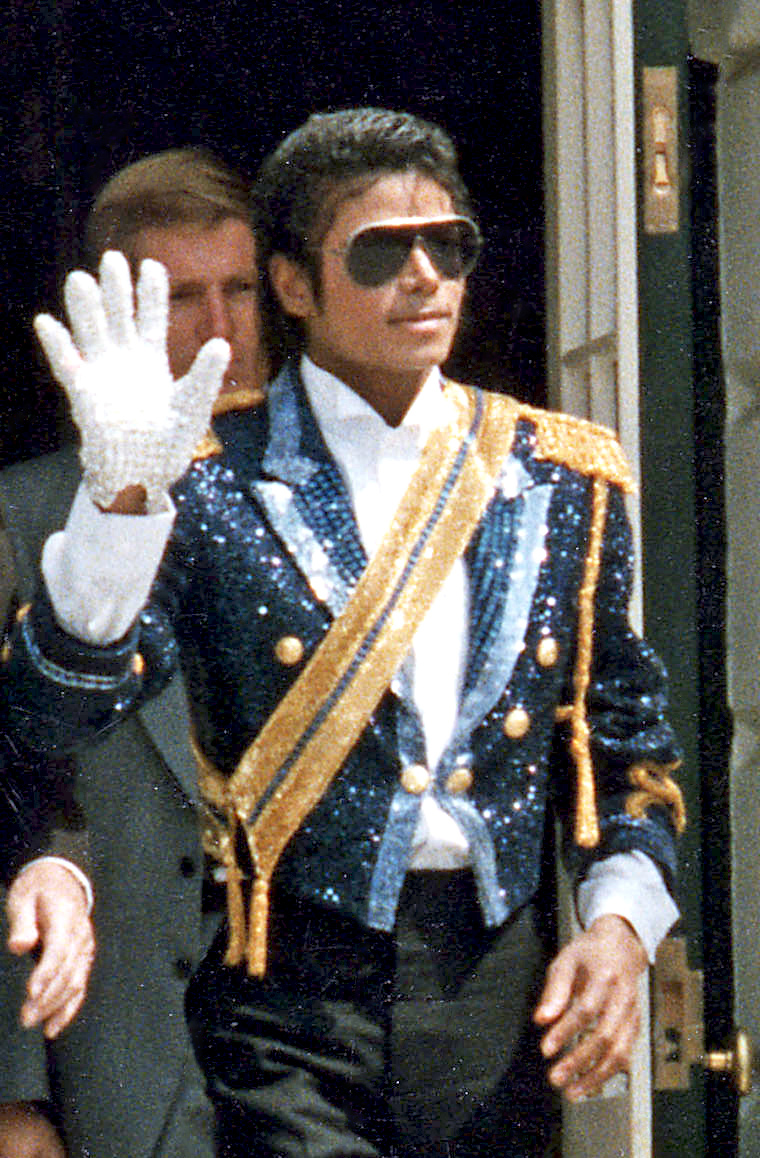
Pop singer Michael Jackson (pictured), who died in June 2009, was prominently featured in "Dead Celebrities"

"Dead Celebrities" was written and directed by series co-founder Trey Parker, and was rated TV-MA L in the United States. It first aired on October 7, 2009, in the United States on Comedy Central. The day after "Dead Celebrities" was originally broadcast, T-shirts and hooded sweatshirts based on the episode were made available at South Park Studios, the official South Park website. It featured a frightened Ike standing above the phrase, "I see dead celebrities".

"Dead Celebrities" includes references to several actors, singers and other celebrities who died in the middle of 2009, when the thirteenth season of South Park was on a mid-season hiatus. The episode serves not only to parody the celebrities themselves, but also to provide commentary on the tendency of American media to exploit, idolatrize and excessively report on the lives and deaths of celebrities. The most prominently featured of these celebrities is pop singer Michael Jackson, who died of multiple drug intoxication on June 25.

Billy Mays, a television advertisement salesman, is the first dead celebrity featured in the episode, and plays a large role in the early part of the script. Mays' son, Billy Mays III, a self-proclaimed South Park fan, said he loved "Dead Celebrities", and found its portrayal of his late father tasteful and respectful. He said, "South Park gets a little edgy sometimes, but at their core, they're just social satire, you know? I think it was natural for them to do a dead celebrities episode with this whole summer and how it's been, and I think the way they did it was pretty tasteful for the most part." The spirit of David Carradine is shown half-naked in lingerie and with a noose around his neck, a nod to his June 3, 2009, death by autoerotic asphyxiation. Among the others featured in the episode were actress Farrah Fawcett, journalist Walter Cronkite, disc jockey Adam Goldstein (DJ AM), politician Ted Kennedy, actress Beatrice Arthur, television game show host Ed McMahon, actor Patrick Swayze, actress Natasha Richardson, hot dog magnate Oscar G. Mayer, Jr. and actor/professional chef Dom DeLuise. Similar to the spirit of Carradine mentioned above, the spirit of Richardson is shown wearing skiing attire, a nod to her March 18, 2009, death from a skiing accident.

== Cultural references ==
"Dead Celebrities" makes frequent mention of the Chipotle Mexican Grill restaurant chain, describing the food as extremely tasty, but claiming it resulted in bloody stool. In the episode's commentary, Trey Parker and Matt Stone admitted that they loved Chipotle, but found it funnier to use a restaurant with a reputation of being healthier rather than typical fast food restaurants like McDonald's or Carl's Jr. Ike's ability to see the spirits of dead celebrities parodies the 1999 M. Night Shyamalan-directed film The Sixth Sense, which stars Haley Joel Osment as a young boy who can see ghosts. Ike's line, "I see dead celebrities", is a reference to that film's most famous line, "I see dead people." The old lady psychic with a very high-pitched voice is a reference to the character played by Zelda Rubinstein in the 1982 horror film, Poltergeist. Another film reference is made to The Exorcist when the medium is flung from the window. "Dead Celebrities" also mocks the Syfy reality television series Ghost Hunters by featuring the show's stars attempting to contact the celebrity spirits, only to be frightened and run away. Finally, the episode also parodies children's beauty pageants and the tendency of stage mothers to become unhealthily obsessed with their children winning such contests.

== Reception ==
"When I first learned of the premise of this episode, I was expecting some biting social commentary on our culture's obsession with celebrities and the hypocrisy of treating them like dirt when they're alive and practically worshiping them when they die. But the writers kept it simple, and just went for the laughs, and enough time had passed for the jokes to not seem too tasteless."

— Ramsley Isler, IGN

In its original American broadcast on October 7, 2009, "Dead Celebrities" was watched by 2.67 million overall households, according to Nielsen ratings. It received a 1.8 rating/3 share, and a 1.5 rating/4 share among viewers aged between 18 and 49.

The episode received generally mixed reviews. Ramsley Isler of IGN called "Dead Celebrities" one of the best episodes of the season, adding the jokes at the expense of the deceased were not too tasteless. He praised the parodies of The Sixth Sense, Poltergeist and Ghost Hunters, but said some jokes, like the masturbating judges at the children's beauty contest, were offensive and unfunny. Jason Hawes and Grant Wilson, stars of Ghost Hunters, declared that "far from being offended or incensed [...] they loved being made fun of alongside Michael Jackson and Billy Mays. Carlos Delgado of iF Magazine said "Dead Celebrities" was an especially funny episode that also featured a "crapload of story" that was well-timed for the Halloween season. Josh Modell of The A.V. Club called it "a decent episode", but felt the dead celebrities were too obvious targets for South Park satire, adding, "It's easy to make the same jokes that the rest of the world already has." Modell said the Sixth Sense and Poltergeist references "fell a little flat", but he praised the Chipotle subplot, which he called "beautifully random [and] totally ridiculous". Ken Tucker of Entertainment Weekly said the episode was in bad taste, but added, "I laughed until I choked". Tucker described the Michael Jackson impersonation as "first-rate" and felt the solution to freeing Jackson's spirit served as "a ruthless parody of child beauty pageants".

Ingela Ratledge of TV Guide favorably described the episode as the exact opposite of award show segments that reverentially pay homage to the year's departed celebrities, calling it "a wonderfully tasteless farewell." Sue Bergerstein, an arts and celebrity writer with Examiner.com, called "Dead Celebrities" a "new low" for South Park, adding "It's not only tasteless but this episode just adds to the sadness currently experienced by all the mourning relatives." Newsweek writer Joshua Alston said few of the jokes in "Dead Celebrities" were funny, and so the mocking of celebrities "in the absence of laughs, felt tasteless and unnecessary". Alan Sepinwall, television journalist with The Star-Ledger, said many of the episodes seemed rehashed and predictable, especially those targeting Michael Jackson and children's beauty pageants. Sepinwall added he liked the Chipotle subplot, but commented, "Overall, 'Dead Celebrities' was a misfire."

== Home release ==
"Dead Celebrities", along with the thirteen other episodes from South Park's thirteenth season, were released on a three-disc DVD set and two-disc Blu-ray set in the United States on March 16, 2010. The sets included brief audio commentaries by Parker and Stone for each episode, a collection of deleted scenes, and a special mini-feature Inside Xbox: A Behind-the-Scenes Tour of South Park Studios, which discussed the process behind animating the show with Inside Xbox host Major Nelson.

A deleted scene from this episode is included on the complete thirteenth season DVD and Blu-ray Disc sets. It shows the boys taking Michael Jackson (in Ike's body) to the South Park location of Forest Lawn Memorial-Parks & Mortuaries to prove he is dead. When they reach the grave, Jackson denies it and Kyle attempts to show him by taking a shovel and digging his grave. Stan at first opposes but he, with Cartman and Kenny take shovels and the scene ends with the boys digging Jackson's grave to show he is dead while Ike/Jackson dances. The reason this scene was cut was due to Jackson's grave inaccurately showing his date of death as July 25, 2009.

== See also ==
- "The Jeffersons", an episode of South Park in which Michael Jackson was parodied prior to "Dead Celebrities".
