= Pee (South Park) =

- South Park episode
- Episode no.: Season 13; Episode 14
- Directed by: Trey Parker
- Written by: Trey Parker
- Production code: 1314
- Original air date: November 18, 2009

Episode chronology
← Previous "Dances with Smurfs"	Next → "Sexual Healing"
- South Park season 13

"Pee" is the fourteenth and final episode of the thirteenth season of the American animated television series South Park. It is the 195th overall episode of the series and originally aired on Comedy Central in the United States on November 18, 2009. In the episode, the boys visit Pi Pi's Splashtown, the local waterpark, where so many people urinate in the pools to the point that the entire park becomes engulfed in tsunamis of urine.

The episode was written and directed by series co-creator Trey Parker, and was rated TV-MA L in the United States. "Pee" served as a parody of the disaster film genre, particularly Roland Emmerich's 2009 film 2012 which was released five days before "Pee" was even broadcast. According to Nielsen ratings, the finale episode was seen by 2.87 million households, making it the highest rated cable show of the night. The episode received mixed reviews.

== Plot ==
One summer day, Cartman, and his friends, Stan, Kyle, Kenny, Butters and Jimmy arrive at Pi Pi's Splashtown, the local waterpark. Cartman is distraught to discover that most of the park's attendants are people of different races, while Kyle is incredibly repulsed to learn so many people freely urinate in the pools. Based on his observance of more "minorities" at the park than white people, Cartman calculates there will be no white people left by the year 2012, and interprets this as a sign that Mayans accurately predicted the world would end the same year, and that the new world will be "made up of minorities". Annoyed by Cartman's racism, Kyle points out that since white people do not make up the majority of the park's attendance, then they are the new minority, but Cartman refuses to believe it, ignorantly thinking that a minority is someone who is "black or brown". At the same time, Kyle walks by an elderly man and woman and finds out that the man peed in the pool, which disgusts Kyle. A bespectacled male scientist tests the park's water and discovers it is 98% urine. He urges Pi Pi, the park's Venetian owner, to immediately close and evacuate his park, claiming the high urine content will soon trigger a cataclysmic event. Pi Pi dismisses the warning. But when a little girl is shown urinating in a wave pool, the park is overcome and destroyed by tsunamis of yellow urine and volcanic eruptions. Hundreds of people drown in the subsequent flood, including Kenny, but the other boys manage to survive.

The destroyed park is quarantined, and the scientist advises against a mission to rescue those trapped inside, fearing their exposure to "pee contamination" has turned them into dangerous, hate-filled mutants. To prove his theory, the scientist urinates onto a test monkey, which clearly becomes annoyed and enraged. An antidote to this reaction is then tested on other monkeys, but proven unsuccessful when the monkeys still become angered when urinated on. Meanwhile, Cartman clings to debris to stay afloat, while the other boys have reached higher ground. Cartman is rescued by the occupants of an inflatable raft from a water park ride. Noticing he is the only white person in the raft, Cartman assumes he is the "last of his species", and that his envisioned 2012 scenario has occurred three years early. He imagines a world in which he must speak in minority slang, is paid lower wages, and eventually forced to live in a concentration camp.

The other boys find Pi Pi, who informs them the park can be drained of the inundation if someone can swim through the pee to reach an emergency release valve. Kyle reluctantly agrees to do the job as he said at the start of the episode that he could hold his breath for the longest, but is horrified to learn he must drink some of the pee in order to offset the fluid pressure he will encounter at the depths. Outside, an antidote that keeps the monkeys calm during yet another urination test is discovered: bananas. Back inside the park, Kyle reluctantly drinks a jarful of pee in preparation for his plunge into the flood. Just after he finishes the jar, helicopters arrive as part of the rescue mission, which makes Kyle extremely furious for drinking pee when he didn't have to. After escaping the pee-filled water park, Cartman reunites with his friends, and is glad that he is not the last of the species and he declares that he will live up to the fullest. Kyle angrily says that he has to get his stomach pumped at the hospital. Stan reassures that it is only a little pee. Kyle angrily complains that bananas are the only thing (in his opinion) "more disgusting" than pee. The water tester doles out bananas to the kids. The fire marshal tells them that they must eat their bananas immediately. Kyle angrily asks why, but a police officer aims his gun at Kyle, saying that he must do it, or he will be put down and Kyle yells in frustration.

== Production ==
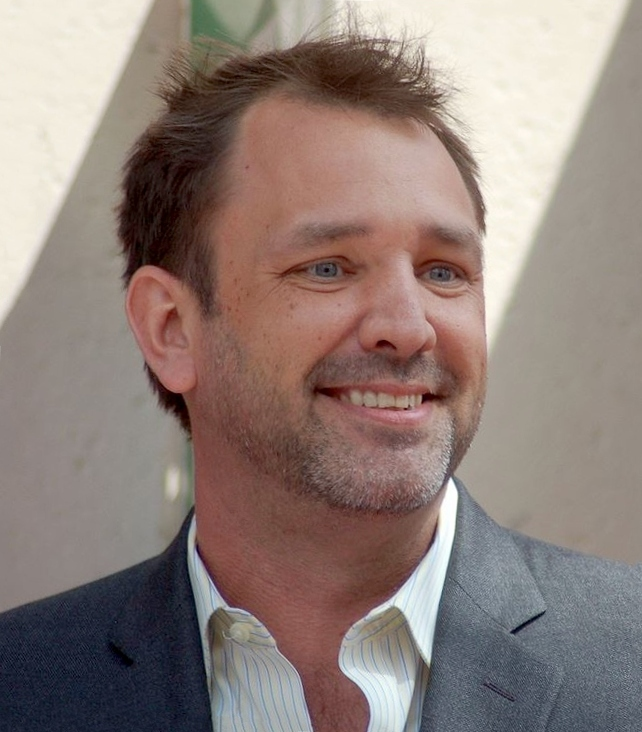
Trey Parker wrote and directed the episode

"Pee", the South Park thirteenth season finale, was written and directed by series co-founder Trey Parker, and was rated TV-MA in the United States. Since the episode takes place in a waterpark, all animation had to be drawn from scratch. The episode was conceived a mere week before its initial broadcast, and the animation was almost completely unfinished two days before airing. Parker and Matt Stone had the idea of a waterpark-themed episode for a long time and reminisced about Water World in Denver, Colorado during the episode's production. Initially, the name of the park in the episode was Pi Pi's Urine World. "Pee" first aired on November 18, 2009 in the United States on Comedy Central. The episode marked the third time during the thirteenth season that Kenny was killed, a running gag throughout the series. He also died during the season premiere, "The Ring" and during "W.T.F." During one of the final scenes, an alien holding a banana is visible among the crowd in the background. The alien was placed in the episode as part of a contest offered by the show's official website, in which viewers who could find and identify the alien in the episode could enter a contest, with the winner getting an animated version of himself or herself placed in the South Park opening credits.

The episode featured a musical number sung by Cartman in which he despairs over the number of "minorities" at the waterpark. The day after "Pee" was originally broadcast, three different kinds of T-shirts and hooded sweatshirts based on the episode were made available on South Park Studios, the official website of South Park. One featured Butters standing next to a puddle of urine saying, "1 in 3 People Admit They Pee in Pools". The second included Cartman and his quote from the episode, "Your world is cold and void of any humanity". The third featured Stan, Cartman, Kyle and Kenny wearing bathing suits and standing in front of a Pi Pi's Splashtown logo.

== Cultural references ==
The episode is a parody on the disaster film genre, which has been parodied in previous South Park episodes, like "Pandemic", the twelfth season parody of the film Cloverfield. "Pee" included a particularly large number of references to 2012, a science fiction film about the end of the world as predicted by the Mayan calendar, which was released only days before "Pee" was originally broadcast. The episode parodies many common elements of such disaster films, including scientists struggling to figure out the source of the problem. The destruction of rides and park amenities by the tsunami of urine is a reference to the destruction of historical monuments in 2012, and other such disaster films by Roland Emmerich, the director of, White House Down, 2012, Independence Day and The Day After Tomorrow. "Pee" also includes several references to the 2012 phenomenon, the prediction that cataclysmic events would occur in the year 2012, which is said to be the end of the Mayan Long Count calendar. The scene in which Kyle is forced to drink three cups of urine in order to prevent his body from enduring the effects of fluid pressure before swimming down to drain it all out, is a parody of a scene in the 1989 film The Abyss, where the protagonist inhales a liquid breathing medium before venturing into the ocean depths. There is a reference to the film Alive (1993) when Randy comes to rescue the children on a helicopter. He is holding a red baby shoe, just as Nando Parrado at the end of the movie. Additionally, the episode references the film 28 Days Later, where the authorities and scientists believe that the urine creates feelings of "rage", a direct reference to 28 Days Later's Rage virus

== Reception ==
In its original American broadcast on November 18, 2009, "Pee" was watched by 2.87 million overall households, according to the Nielsen ratings, making it the most watched cable show of the night. It beat the second highest-ranked cable show, Bravo's Top Chef, by about 600,000 households.

The episode received generally mixed reviews. If Magazine writer Carl Cortez, who was critical of the second half of season thirteen, ranked "Pee" as one of the best episodes of the season, and said it included several "classic South Park moments". Cortez called it a "wonderfully twisted spoof" of disaster films and called the script "pretty biting stuff ... without being wholly offensive". Ramsey Isler of IGN said the emergency staff subplot working on a cure was not "quite perfect parody". But he praised Kyle in the ending scene, as well as the way South Park found a new, literal twist on "toilet humor" by featuring rivers and tsunamis of pee.

Sean O'Neal of The A.V. Club said that the episode was overly offensive, rather than an ironic commentary on racism. Although O'Neal said previous South Park episodes like "With Apologies to Jesse Jackson" were effective, "Pee" and its references to minority park attendees and the Italian waterpark owner "came off less like ironic racism and more as good, old-fashioned, butter-your-cornbread-with-it racism". An airing on August 4, 2017 featured a muffled version of the song.

== Home media ==
"Pee", along with the thirteen other episodes from South Park's thirteenth season, was released on a three-disc DVD set and two-disc Blu-ray set in the United States on March 16, 2010. The sets included brief audio commentaries by Parker and Stone for each episode, a collection of deleted scenes, and a special mini-feature Inside Xbox: A Behind-the-Scenes Tour of South Park Studios, which discussed the process behind animating the show with Inside Xbox host Major Nelson.
