= Pipi =

Pipi may refer to:

== People ==
- Pipi A, a High Priest of Ptah during the Ancient Egyptian 21st Dynasty
- Neterkheperre Meryptah called Pipi II, Ancient Egyptian 21st Dynasty High Priest of Ptah
- Pipi Estrada (born 1957), Spanish sports reporter
- Pipi Wobaho, Beninese singer
- Pipi (footballer, born 1915), full name Serafim Pinto Ribeiro Júnior, Brazilian football forward
- Pipi (footballer, born 2003), full name Takuhiro Nakai, Japanese football midfielder
- Tomislav Piplica (born 1969), Bosnian soccer manager and former player nicknamed "Pipi"
- Ama Pipi (born 1985), British athlete
- Rogério Pipi (1922–2019), Portuguese soccer player

=== Fictional characters ===
- Guan Pipi, a fictional character from the streaming TV show Moonshine and Valentine
- Pipi, a fictional character from the videogame Pipi & Bibi's
- Pipi (Korean: 삐삐), a fictional character from Pororo; see List of Pororo the Little Penguin characters

== Places ==
- Pipi Natural Bridge, a geological formation in the Central African Republic

== Plants and animals ==
- Plebidonax deltoides, an edible clam known as pipi in parts of Australia
- Paphies australis, a mollusc endemic to New Zealand, known from Māori as pipi
- Litsea garciae, a tree native to Southeast Asia locally called pipi

== Other uses ==
- Pipi, a transcription (ΠΙΠΙ) into Greek of the Tetragrammaton
- "PIPI in your pampers", a phrase notably used by chess grandmaster Tigran L. Petrosian

== See also ==
- Pipis (disambiguation)
- Peepee (disambiguation)
- Pippi (disambiguation)
- Pippy (disambiguation)
- Pip (disambiguation), for Pip I
