= Pe =

Pe may refer to:

== Linguistics and orthography ==
- Pe language
- Pe (Cyrillic), a letter (П) in the Cyrillic alphabet
- Pe (Semitic), a letter (פ ,ف, etc.) in several Semitic alphabets
  - Pe (Persian), a letter (پ) in the Arabic alphabet
- Pe (Armenian), a letter (Պ պ) in the Armenian alphabet
- Pe (kana), in syllabic Japanese script

== Mathematics, science, and technology ==
- Weierstrass p (also called "pe"), a mathematical letter (℘) used in Weierstrass's elliptic functions and power sets
- Péclet number (abbreviated "Pe."), a dimensionless number used in diffusion studies in hydrogeology and physical chemistry
- Pe (text editor), a text editor for BeOS
- Petlyakov, Russian aircraft design bureau
- Reduction potential (commonly abbreviated pe, or E_{h}), where, pe = –log [e^{–}] = E_{h} (volt)/0.05916 (with 0.05916 = (RT/F) × ln10) according to Nernst equation

== Places ==
- Pe (city), Ancient Egyptian city that merged into Buto
- Pe, Tibet, a town on the Yarlung Tsangpo River
- .pe, the Internet country code top-level domain (ccTLD) for Peru

== See also ==
- PE (disambiguation)
- Pi (disambiguation)
- Pee (disambiguation)
