= Puppy (disambiguation) =

A puppy is a juvenile dog.

Puppy or puppies may also refer to:

== Art and literature ==
- Puppy (2005 film), an independent Australian feature film
- Puppy (2013 film), an American short film in the Despicable Me franchise
- Puppy (2019 film), an Indian Tamil-language comedy drama film
- Puppy (2022 film), a South Korean film
- Puppy (2025 film), an Indian Kannada-language drama film
- Puppy (Alice's Adventures in Wonderland), a fictional character in Lewis Carroll's Alice's Adventures in Wonderland
- "Puppy" (short story), by George Saunders, from his collection Tenth of December
- Puppy (Koons), a sculpture by Jeff Koons
- Puppy! (Hotel Transylvania), a 2017 short film set in the Hotel Transylvania franchise universe
- The puppies, fictional characters from the novel Animal Farm
- Puppy, a Marvel Comics character and pet of the Fantastic Four

== Music ==
- The Puppies (New wave band) a 1980s new wave band from San Diego
- The Puppies, a 1990s rap group
- Puppy (band) an alternative metal band
- Puppy (Fluke album), 2003
- Puppy (YuiKaori album), 2011
- Puppy (A Boy's Truly Rough), an album by Hawksley Workman, 2006
- "We Can Only Live Today (Puppy)", a song by Netsky
- "Puppy", 2007 song by Sahara Hotnights on What If Leaving Is a Loving Thing
- "Puppies", an extra track on the 20th anniversary editions of Second Toughest in the Infants by Underworld

== Technology ==
- Puppy Linux, a Live CD Linux distribution
- Clement Ivanov, 'Puppey', DotA 2 eSports player

== Television ==
- Nick Jr. Puppies, a Nickelodeon television series
- "Puppies", an episode of the television series Zoboomafoo
- "Puppies", an episode of the television series Teletubbies
- "The Puppy Episode", a 1997 episode of the TV sitcom Ellen

== See also ==
- Puppy play, a form of animal roleplay
- Puppy Dome
- Pup (disambiguation)
- Pippy
