= PP =

PP, pp or P_{p} may refer to:

== Arts and media ==
=== Music ===
- Pianissimo, 'very quiet' in musical dynamics
- Peso Pluma, musician
- PinkPantheress, singer

=== Other media ===
- Peppa Pig, a British preschool animated series (since 2004)
- Police procedural, a subgenre of detective fiction
- The Enemy of the World, a Doctor Who serial (1967–1968) (production code PP)

== Organizations ==
=== Political parties ===
- Patriot Party (disambiguation)
- Patriotic Party (Guatemala)
- People's Partnership (Trinidad and Tobago)
- People's Party (disambiguation)
- Pirate Party (global)
- Prodalzhavame promyanata (Bulgaria) (usually translated as "We Continue the Change")
- Progressistas (Brazil)
- Progressive Party (disambiguation)
- Prosperity Party (Ethiopia)

=== Other organizations ===
- Pancasila Youth (Pemuda Pancasila), an Indonesian paramilitary organization
- PayPal, an online payments company
- PediaPress, a German software company
- Planned Parenthood, a reproductive health organization

== People ==
- PinkPantheress, singer
- Philipp Plein, fashion designer
- Peso Pluma, musician
- Pierre Poilievre, Canadian politician

== Science, technology, and mathematics ==
=== Biology and medicine ===
- Vitamin PP, or nicotinamide
- Paliperidone palmitate, an antipsychotic medication
- Pancreatic polypeptide, a polypeptide secreted by PP cells
  - PP cell, or pancreatic polypeptide cell
- pro parte, for a type of synonymy in taxonomy

=== Computing ===
- PP (complexity), a probabilistic polynomial time complexity class
- PP-format (Post Processing Format), a file format for meteorological data
- PP X.400, an e-mail protocol
- Plug and play (P&P), a property of a peripheral device
- Microsoft PowerPoint, a presentation program

=== Mathematics ===
- P–P plot, a probability plot, in statistics
- Percentage point, in business writing and statistics
- Presque partout (almost everywhere), in measure theory and analysis
- Process performance index (P_{p})

=== Other uses in science and technology ===
- Length between perpendiculars ("pp" or "p/p"), the length of a ship
- Peak to peak (p–p) amplitude of a signal
- Polypropylene, a common plastic polymer
- Proton–proton chain, in nuclear physics and astronomy

== Other uses ==
- Papa Pontifex, a post-nominal used by popes
- Paris Principles (cataloging), used in the creation of bibliographical cataloging rules
- per procurationem, used when signing on behalf of another
- Percy Pig, a British brand of pig-shaped fruit-flavoured confectionery products
- Walther PP, a pistol

== See also ==
- Peepee (disambiguation)
