= PUP =

PUP may refer to:

== Organizations ==
- Polytechnic University of the Philippines
- Princeton University Press
- Public-public partnership, a partnership with a government body

== Politics ==
- Palmer United Party, a political party of Australia
- Party of Proletarian Unity, a political party of France
- People's Unification Party, a political party of Liberia
- People's United Party, a political party of Belize
- Progressive Unionist Party, a political party of Northern Ireland
- Proletarian Unity Party (France), a former political party of France
- Protestant Unionist Party, a former political party of Northern Ireland
- Unity and Progress Party, a political party of Guinea

== Technology ==
- PARC Universal Packet, one of the two earliest internetworking communications protocols
- Potentially unwanted program, computer malware

== Other uses ==
- COVID-19 Pandemic Unemployment Payment, available to Irish residents working in a business sector, i.e. catering, that has been shut due to the virus
- Power Utility Profile, a Precision Time Protocol for electrical substations IEC/IEEE 61850-9-3
- Physically unable to perform, a rule in the NFL
- PUP (band), a Canadian punk rock band
  - PUP (album), 2013

== See also ==
- Pup (disambiguation)
- Party of United Pensioners of Serbia, a Serbian political party
