= South Park season 13 =

Season of television series

South Park
- Season 13
- Home media release cover
- No. of episodes: 14

Release
- Original network: Comedy Central
- Original release: March 11 – November 18, 2009

Season chronology
- ← Previous; Season 12 Next → Season 14

The thirteenth season of South Park, an American animated television comedy series, originally aired in the United States on Comedy Central between March 11 and November 18, 2009. The season was headed by the series creators Trey Parker and Matt Stone, who served as executive producers along with Anne Garefino. The season continued to focus on the exploits of protagonists Stan, Kyle, Cartman, Kenny and Butters in the fictional Colorado mountain town of South Park.

The season was the first of three new seasons Parker and Stone agreed to produce for the network under a renewal deal. It consisted of fourteen 22-minute episodes, which aired in two groups of seven episodes separated by a six-month gap. Prior to the season's premiere, all South Park episodes were made available for free viewing on the official series website, South Park Studios. The 13th season was the first to be broadcast in high definition and in widescreen. Continuing their practice from previous seasons, Parker and Stone wrote and produced each episode within the week before its broadcast date.

The 13th season satirized such topics as the ACORN scandal, Japanese whaling, piracy in Somalia and the marketing tactics of The Walt Disney Company. Celebrities were spoofed throughout the season, including the Jonas Brothers, Kanye West, Carlos Mencia, Paul Watson and Glenn Beck, all of whom publicly responded to their portrayals. The episode "Fishsticks" attracted particular media attention due to rapper Kanye West's declaration that its jokes about his arrogance were funny but hurt his feelings. "The F Word", in which the central characters attempt to change the definition of the word "fag", was especially controversial and prompted complaints from the Gay & Lesbian Alliance Against Defamation. A broadcast of "Pinewood Derby" in Mexico was pulled, allegedly due to its depiction of President Felipe Calderón. "Fatbeard" was praised by the crew of USS Bainbridge, which was involved in the 2009 rescue of MV Maersk Alabama from Somali pirates.

The 13th season received mixed reviews: some critics called it one of South Park's strongest seasons, while others claimed the series was starting to decline in quality. The season maintained the average Nielsen rating viewership for the series, around 3 million viewers per episode. The episode "Margaritaville", which satirized the global recession then affecting much of the industrialized world, won the 2009 Emmy Award for Outstanding Animated Program (for Programming Less Than One Hour).

== Episodes ==
| No. overall | No. in season | Title | Directed by | Written by | Original release date | Prod. code | U.S. viewers (millions) |
|---|---|---|---|---|---|---|---|
| 182 | 1 | "The Ring" | Trey Parker | Trey Parker | March 11, 2009 | 1301 | 3.41 |
When Kenny's new girlfriend receives a purity ring at a concert, the boys find out that Mickey Mouse is using the rings as a scheme.
| 183 | 2 | "The Coon" | Trey Parker | Trey Parker | March 18, 2009 | 1302 | 3.27 |
Cartman poses as a superhero vigilante, The Coon, and grows jealous of the popularity and success of a rival superhero, Mysterion.
| 184 | 3 | "Margaritaville" | Trey Parker | Trey Parker | March 25, 2009 | 1303 | 2.77 |
When Randy Marsh tries to teach Stan how to save money, a recession hits South Park.
| 185 | 4 | "Eat, Pray, Queef" | Trey Parker | Trey Parker | April 1, 2009 | 1304 | 3.01 |
The Terrance and Phillip show is preempted by a new program, The Queef Sisters.
| 186 | 5 | "Fishsticks" | Trey Parker | Trey Parker | April 8, 2009 | 1305 | 3.11 |
Jimmy Valmer comes up with a joke that becomes a national sensation, and Cartman takes all of the credit. Meanwhile, Carlos Mencia claims credit for the joke and rapper Kanye West is mocked for not understanding it.
| 187 | 6 | "Pinewood Derby" | Trey Parker | Trey Parker | April 15, 2009 | 1306 | 2.78 |
When Stan's pinewood derby car is sabotaged, it is discovered by an alien species.
| 188 | 7 | "Fatbeard" | Trey Parker | Trey Parker | April 22, 2009 | 1307 | 2.59 |
The kids mistake the piracy in Somalia for a return of the classic era of swashbuckling pirates, and Cartman convinces his classmates to run away to Somalia.
| 189 | 8 | "Dead Celebrities" | Trey Parker | Trey Parker | October 7, 2009 | 1308 | 2.67 |
Ike is terrified by encounters with the ghosts of recently deceased celebrities, especially Billy Mays. Michael Jackson refuses to acknowledge his own death.
| 190 | 9 | "Butters' Bottom Bitch" | Trey Parker | Trey Parker | October 14, 2009 | 1309 | 2.56 |
Butters purchases his first kiss from a girl which escalates to him becoming a pimp.
| 191 | 10 | "W.T.F." | Trey Parker | Trey Parker | October 21, 2009 | 1310 | 2.58 |
After seeing a live WWE Raw event, the boys form their own backyard wrestling federation.
| 192 | 11 | "Whale Whores" | Trey Parker | Trey Parker | October 28, 2009 | 1311 | 2.57 |
When Japanese people slaughter dolphins at an aquarium, Stan takes on the cause of saving the dolphins and whales from Japanese whalers.
| 193 | 12 | "The F Word" | Trey Parker | Trey Parker | November 4, 2009 | 1312 | 2.82 |
When Cartman refers to an obnoxious motorcycle group as "faggots", Big Gay Al and Mr. Slave have issues with the term.
| 194 | 13 | "Dances with Smurfs" | Trey Parker | Trey Parker | November 11, 2009 | 1313 | 2.77 |
When Cartman is chosen to read the South Park Elementary morning announcements, he uses it as a platform to make critical statements about the school.
| 195 | 14 | "Pee" | Trey Parker | Trey Parker | November 18, 2009 | 1314 | 2.87 |
The boys go on a trip to the water park, where Cartman is distraught to discover that many people from minority groups are in attendance. Cartman calculates there will be no white people left by the year 2012, which he believes is in accordance with the Mayans' prediction of the end of the world.

== Production ==
=== Crew ===
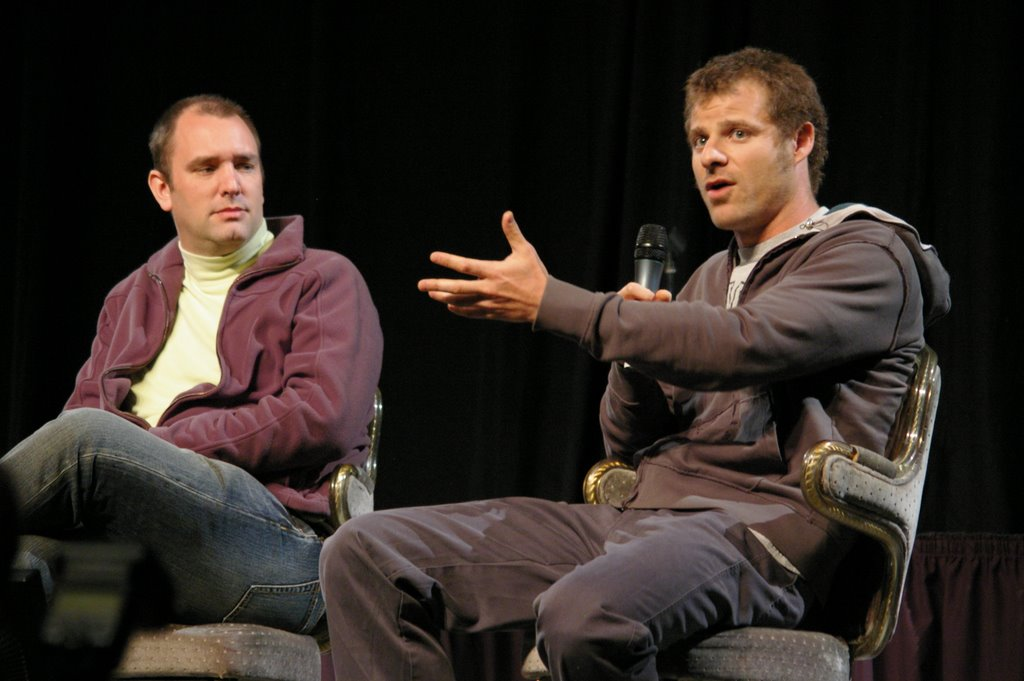
South Park co-creators Trey Parker and Matt Stone served as executive producers for the 13th season.

Series creators Trey Parker and Matt Stone were the executive producers of the 13th season of South Park, along with Anne Garefino. The season was distributed by Comedy Central, where the series has aired since its inception in 1997. Frank C. Agnone II served as supervising producer, while Eric Stough, Adrien Beard, Vernon Chatman, Bruce Howell and Erica Rivinoja worked as producers. Parker also served as director and writer for the thirteenth season. Saturday Night Live cast member Bill Hader, who had previously worked as a consultant on the show, was credited as a producer starting in season 13. Hader said of his role with the show, "It's really Trey and Matt who kind of write everything, and you're just in the room kind of helping them.

Basically, I'm friends with them and they're just nice enough to invite me into the room and let me goof around." Ryan Quincy served as director of animation during the 13th season.

=== Development ===
South Park was set to expire in 2008, but in August 2007 it was announced the series would be renewed for at least three more seasons, extending it through 2011. The new seasons, 13, 14 and 15, were each to consist of 14 episodes. Stone said of the announcement, "Three more years of South Park will give us the opportunity to offend that many more people." Parker and Stone also announced they would partner with Comedy Central to create a Los Angeles–based digital animation studio called South Park Digital Studios, which would serve as the center for all digital extensions of the South Park franchise and other animated projects.

Prior to the broadcast of the 13th season, Parker and Stone made every episode from the previous 12 seasons of South Park available for free viewing on the official series website, South Park Studios. New episodes from the 13th season were made available for one week after the original airdate, then removed for 30 days, after which they were returned to the site permanently. The episodes were uncensored and ad-supported, so no membership fees were required to view the shows. In a statement, Parker and Stone said, "We got really sick of having to download our own show illegally all the time. So we gave ourselves a legal alternative."

Two months before the 13th season premiered, South Park Studios announced that it would be the first season to be broadcast in high definition and presented in widescreen. Episodes from previous seasons were also converted to high definition. The season's episodes first aired in the United States on Wednesdays at 10 p.m. Eastern Standard Time on Comedy Central, and were repeated Wednesdays at 12 a.m., Thursdays at 10 p.m. and 12 a.m., and Sundays at 11 p.m. and 2 a.m., all EST. The first seven episodes of the season aired from March 11, 2009, premiering with "The Ring", and ended on April 22 with the mid-season finale "Fatbeard". The season returned with seven more episodes, resuming on October 7 with "Dead Celebrities", and ending on November 18 with the season finale, "Pee".

=== Writing ===
Continuing their practice from previous seasons, Parker and Stone wrote and produced each episode within the week before its broadcast date, although as in previous seasons, only Parker was listed as writer in the end credits. The duo conceived a list of episode ideas at the start of the season, but said they preferred to wait until the last minute to start working. Deadline pressure, they explained, energized them as if they were doing a live show. Stone said of the practice, "We kind of need that [chaos] to work. We're, like, 'We have to do something right now. It's going on the air in just a few minutes.'" For example, three days before the broadcast of the season premiere, "The Ring", the script was only half-finished and the animation was incomplete. Likewise, they did not start work on "Whale Whores" until five days before the episode aired, and the scripts for "Margaritaville" and "Pee" were both still being finished the day before the episodes were first broadcast. Parker and Stone said "Dead Celebrities" was a particularly challenging episode to make—they were up all night working on it the day before it aired, and did not finish until 11 a.m. on its broadcast date. Some critics have said that this short turnaround process helps South Park stay fresh and allows the show to address current events in a timely fashion.

The 13th season introduced the characters Katie and Katherine, stars of a television show, The Queef Sisters, that consists largely of vaginal flatulence jokes. They are female equivalents of long-time characters Terrance and Phillip, who are initially angered at the competition from Katie and Katherine, but end up romantically involved with them. Season 13 also marked the final appearance of long-time supporting character Gordon Stoltski, the third grade student who read the morning announcements for South Park Elementary. In the episode "Dances with Smurfs", Gordon is murdered while reading the announcements by a gunman who mistakes him for a truck driver who slept with his wife. Some critics found the scene disturbing and inappropriate in the light of recent school shootings in the United States. In the 2009 Blu-ray commentary for South Park: Bigger, Longer & Uncut, Parker mentioned that they originally had an idea for the season to bring back Saddam Hussein, one of the show's most prominent antagonists during its early run and who last appeared in the 7th season finale "It's Christmas in Canada", but such plans didn't come to fruition.

The running gag of killing protagonist Kenny McCormick continued, though he was killed only three times during the season: in the episode "The Ring", he contracts syphilis after engaging in oral sex; in "W.T.F.", he is shot by a rocket launcher during a professional wrestling match; and in "Pee", he drowns in the urine that inundates the water park. During the final half of the season, aliens were hidden in images throughout the episodes as part of a contest offered by South Park Studios. Viewers able to find the alien in the episode could enter a contest, with the grand winner getting an animated version of himself or herself placed in the South Park opening credits starting the next season. In December 2009, Matthew Klinner was announced winner of the contest.

=== Cultural references ===
The 13th season also continued a South Park tradition of lampooning celebrities and timely issues. The episode "Margaritaville" satirized the global recession affecting much of the industrialized world at the time of the episode's broadcast. Parker and Stone said they had long planned to do an episode about the recession, but did not want to rush it because they wanted to make sure the script was strong. "Fatbeard" was based on real-life piracy in Somalia, which began receiving increasing international media attention in 2008; the Somali pirates are portrayed in a sympathetic light in the episode. "Dances with Smurfs" parodied the political commentary of Glenn Beck, a nationally syndicated radio show host and Fox News Channel political pundit. In the episode, Cartman makes outrageous claims with no basis in fact under the guise that he is simply asking rhetorical questions and seeking further discussion, a practice for which Beck has been criticized.

The episode "Whale Whores" addressed the controversies surrounding Japanese whaling, condemning not only the whalers who engaged in the practice, but shows like Whale Wars and activists like television celebrity Paul Watson who profit from fighting whaling. "Butters' Bottom Bitch" featured a scene in which Butters visits an ACORN office seeking benefits for prostitutes working for him, a reference to a similar 2009 scandal. The episode "Eat, Pray, Queef" demonstrated a double standard between rights of men and women by showing the South Park men, who have no problem with farting, strongly objecting to vaginal flatulence from women. The season finale, "Pee", satirized the disaster film genre, especially the movie 2012, which was released five days before the episode aired. Cartman interprets the large number of minorities at his favorite water park as a sign of the 2012 phenomenon, the prediction that cataclysmic events will occur in the year 2012, which is said to be the end of the Mayan Long Count calendar.

"The Ring" featured parodies of the pop-rock boy band Jonas Brothers and a foul-mouthed, greedy, physically violent Mickey Mouse, satirizing the Walt Disney Company's exploitation of family-friendly morals to disguise its profit motive. "The Coon" served as a parody of dark-toned comic book movies, like The Dark Knight (2008), The Spirit (2008) and Watchmen (2009). "Dead Celebrities" mocked numerous recently deceased celebrities, including Michael Jackson, Billy Mays and David Carradine, as well as the show Ghost Hunters. "Dances with Smurfs" mocked the 2009 James Cameron film Avatar, suggesting the plot borrows heavily from the film Dances with Wolves and comparing Avatar's blue aliens to the cartoon Smurfs. The episode "W.T.F." parodied professional wrestling in general and World Wrestling Entertainment in particular, highlighting the soap opera aspects of wrestling storylines and fans who believe the stories are real.

=== Music ===
"Gay Fish", an original song featured in the episode "Fishsticks"
"Gay Fish" parodies Kanye West's "Heartless", particularly in its extravagant use of Auto-Tune pitch audio processing.

Several original songs written by Parker and Stone were featured in the 13th season. The episode "Fatbeard" features a song, "Somalian Pirates, We", in which Cartman and his crew of pirates sing in the style of the Golden Age of Piracy. In response to fan requests, the full 90-second version of the song was made available for download on South Park Studios the week the episode aired. The season finale, "Pee", features a tune sung by Cartman, "(Too Many Minorities) Not My Water Park", in which he despairs over the large number of African-American, Hispanic-American and Asian-American patrons at his water park. Among other topics, Cartman expresses his anger about long lines full of minorities and park employees speaking Spanish rather than English. The episode "Eat, Pray, Queef" features "Queef Free", a charity single recorded by the men of South Park after they realize women should be free to queef just as men are free to fart. The song has been described as a parody of such celebrities-for-charity songs as "We Are The World".

The 13th season also featured or spoofed real-life songs and bands. The episode "Fishsticks", which prominently featured rapper Kanye West, includes a two-and-a-half minute song, "Gay Fish", that parodies West's "Heartless". "Gay Fish" satirizes the rapper's tendency to rely on audio processing to correct his mistakes in pitch. After "Fishsticks" aired, the full song was made available for download on South Park Studios. Several fake Jonas Brothers songs, with lyrics about the band members' physical attractiveness, were written for "The Ring". Some songs also emphasize the band's belief in sexual abstinence, with lyrics like, "Who needs sex and drugs and partying when we can cook a meal and sit around and watch Netflix?" The strongly erotic reactions of the young girls at their concert parody the frenzied female fan reactions the Jonas Brothers tend to elicit, even though their image projects wholesomeness and chastity. In the episode "Whale Wars", Cartman plays the video game Rock Band and performs a rendition, praised by critics, of the Lady Gaga song "Poker Face". On March 16, 2010, Rock Band developer Harmonix released this version of the song (along with the original version) as downloadable content for the game. In "W.T.F.", during an audition for the boys' professional wrestling league, one of the participants sings a Broadway-style number—parodying the song "Nothing" from A Chorus Line—about why he wants to be a wrestler.

== Reception ==
=== Reviews ===
From knocking celebrities off their high horse, to tackling social issues, to just plain pointing out the ridiculous nature of our every day lives, South Park Season 13 had more cultural impact than most animated series could ever dream of. Sure, it wasn't always great, and previous seasons have been better, but the series sure is doing well for its age.

— Ramsley Isler, IGN

Ramsey Isler of IGN said South Park continued to be the "best animated comedy show on TV" during its 13th season. He said the season had some low points, particularly "Eat, Pray Queef", but that episodes like "The F Word" and "Dances with Smurfs" delivered significant social commentary. Isler described "Fishsticks" as a well-timed, hilarious episode that became a "phenomenon". Ben Flanagan of The Tuscaloosa News said the 13th season was one of the strongest yet for South Park, and that the series continued its tradition of entertainingly combining gross-out comedy with social satire. He wrote, "Whether they tackle the Jonas Brothers, Somali pirates, Kanye West, The Dark Knight, the current economic woes or just the frequent greed and foolishness of the human race, the show continues to solidify itself as not only the funniest show on TV, but the best."

Not all reviews of the season were positive. A.V. Club writer Sean O'Neal called it "one of the more hit-or-miss seasons of South Park in the show’s history", but said he was confident the series could do better and that it had yet not entered the "staggering animal begging to be put out of its misery stage of a show's lifetime". He described the season as a "weekly exercise in South Park schizophrenia", with some episodes faring better than others, although he said the first half of the season was generally strong. Josh Modell, also of the A.V. Club, agreed that the season was uneven, with several episodes "you kinda shrugged your shoulders at", but others like "Butters' Bottom Bitch" that he found "pretty damn funny".

"Fishsticks" particularly attracted media attention, and some critics declared it one of the best episodes of the season. In the episode, Jimmy writes a joke that becomes a national sensation, while Cartman tries to steal the credit. A fictionalized version of rapper Kanye West fails to understand the joke. He cannot admit that he does not get it because, in reference to a perceived ego problem on the part of the real West, he considers himself a genius. On September 13, 2009, during the MTV Video Music Awards, West interrupted an acceptance speech by country singer Taylor Swift, walking on stage, grabbing the microphone and praising her competitor Beyoncé Knowles. The incident received considerable press coverage and, as a result, Comedy Central rebroadcast "Fishsticks" for two straight hours on September 15.

"The F Word" was especially controversial, even by South Park standards. In the episode, the South Park boys attempt to change the official definition of the word "fag" from an anti-homosexual slur to a term describing loud and obnoxious Harley bikers. The uncensored word is voiced casually and very frequently throughout the episode. A.V. Club critic Genevieve Koski argued that "The F Word" advocates a philosophy that language is ever-changing and that taboo words receive their stigma purely due to social circumstance. Although some LGBT activists accepted that the episode had noble intentions, the Gay & Lesbian Alliance Against Defamation nevertheless objected to it, claiming that it still used "fag" as a means of insulting others and could be unintentionally harmful to the gay community. Some critics praised the episode and said it addressed an important and difficult issue, whereas others felt the satire was ineffective and unfunny.

=== Celebrity reactions ===
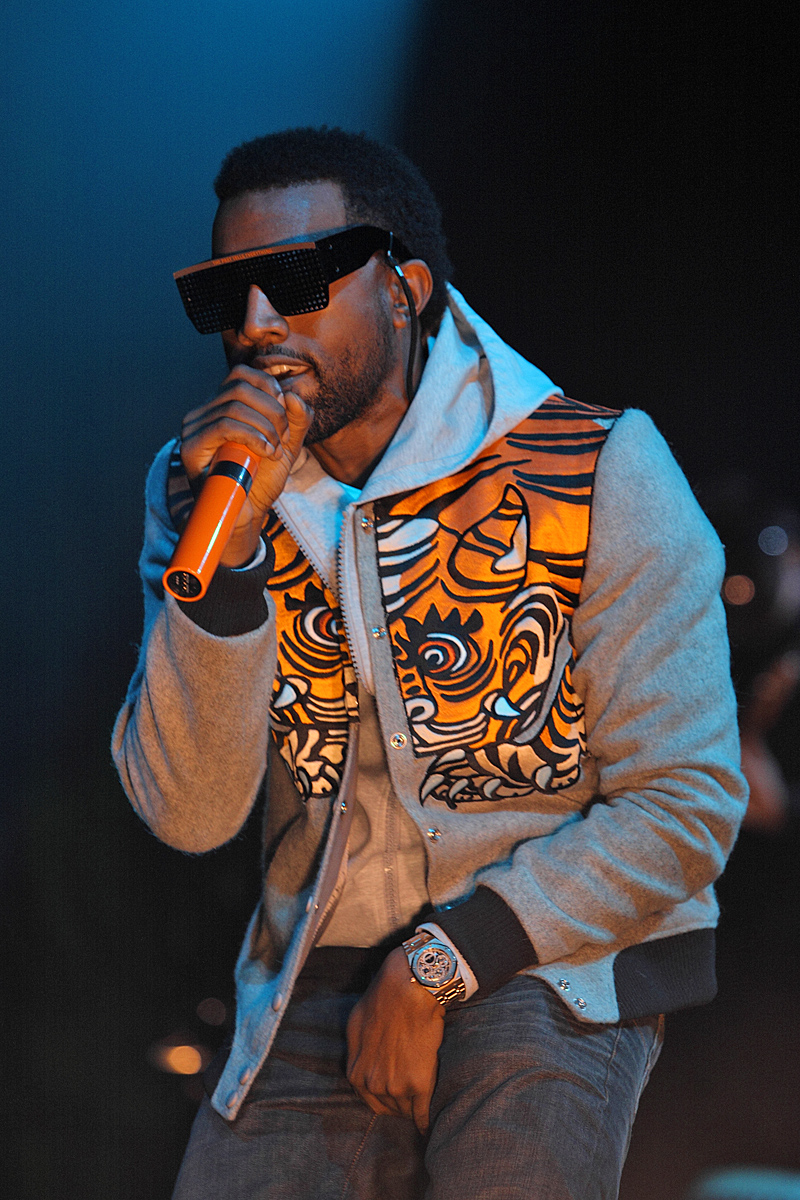
Kanye West, spoofed in "Fishsticks", wrote in his blog that the episode was funny, but it hurt his feelings.

Some celebrities who were spoofed in 13th-season episodes responded to their portrayals. The day after "Fishsticks" aired, West wrote on his blog, "South Park murdered me last night and it's pretty damn funny. It hurts my feelings but what can you expect from South Park!" West thanked the South Park writers in his blog entry and acknowledged he has a problem with his ego, but said he was trying to change. The blog post drew substantial media attention; Daniel Kreps of Rolling Stone said: "Many have tried, all have failed, but in the end it only took four animated children from Colorado to topple Kanye West's ego." Carlos Mencia, host of the Comedy Central show Mind of Mencia, was also spoofed in "Fishsticks". He is portrayed as knowingly stealing credit for a joke he did not write, which is a reference to accusations other comedians have made that Mencia plagiarizes jokes from other people. After the episode aired, Mencia wrote on his Twitter feed, "They just made fun of me on South Park. I thought it was hysterical. Catch the rerun."

In "The Coon", Butters suspects heavyset comedian Bruce Vilanch is Cartman's superhero alter ego based on his physique. After the episode aired, Vilanch sent a card to Parker and Stone thanking them for referring to him. Shortly after "Whale Whores" aired, Paul Watson said he was not offended by his portrayal in the episode, and was glad South Park brought the issue of dolphin and whale slaughter, and the Japanese role in it, to a large audience. After Billy Mays appeared in "Dead Celebrities", his son Billy Mays III said he loved the episode and found its portrayal of his father tasteful and respectful. Jason Hawes and Grant Wilson, the stars of Ghost Hunters who were also mocked in "Dead Celebrities", said they loved the parody and encouraged fans to watch the show on their Twitter accounts. The day after "Dances with Smurfs" originally aired, Glenn Beck discussed the episode on his radio program and said he took the parody as a compliment. The Jonas Brothers' publicist specifically forbade reporters from asking the band members about their portrayal in "The Ring". Nevertheless, Nick Jonas said, "We are always open to make fun of ourselves."

"Pinewood Derby" drew considerable media attention in Mexico when it first aired due to its depiction of Mexican President Felipe Calderón. The episode was due to air in Spanish on MTV Latin America on February 8, 2010, but it was pulled a few hours before the scheduled time. Media reports indicated the decision stemmed from the episode's depiction of Calderón irritating the international community and frivolously spending alien-provided "space cash" on water parks. MTV said the South Park creators did not get a special permit needed to broadcast an image of Mexico's flag, but the explanation was met with skepticism by Mexican South Park fans, some of whom accused MTV of censorship.

"Fatbeard" included prominent references to the April 2009 hijacking of MV Maersk Alabama by Somalian pirates. The crew of USS Bainbridge, the Arleigh Burke-class guided-missile destroyer that participated in the rescue of Richard Phillips from Maersk Alabama, contacted the South Park creators to commend them on the episode. Ensign Jonathan Sieg, the Bainbridge public relations officer, wrote, "Pretty much everyone onboard our ship—from Captain to seaman—is a huge fan of South Park, and when we heard about the episode 'Fatbeard', as you can imagine, we were thrilled and very interested to watch."

=== Ratings ===
The 13th season of South Park generally maintained the average Nielsen rating viewership for the series, around 3 million viewers per episode. The season premiere, "The Ring", was seen in 3.41 million households. That would prove to be the largest individual viewership for any Comedy Central show that season, outperforming even a highly anticipated and publicized episode of The Daily Show involving Jon Stewart's ongoing feud with CNBC and pundit Jim Cramer. The 13th season of South Park received its lowest viewership in the episodes "Dances with Smurfs", seen in 1.47 million households; "W.T.F.", seen in 1.37 million households; and "The F Word", seen in 1.99 million households. However, "The F Word" was the highest rated show of the season among viewers between ages 18 and 49, and outperformed The Jay Leno Show, NBC's primetime talk show. The season finale, "Pee", was seen in 2.87 million households, which made it the most watched cable show of the night. Likewise, "The Coon", seen in 3.27 million households, was the most watched cable program among ages 18 to 49 the week it aired. Several episodes from the 13th season of South Park were the most watched Comedy Central shows the week they aired, including "Margaritaville" (2.77 million households), "Fatbeard" (2.59 million households), "Eat, Pray, Queef" (3 million households) and "Fishsticks" (3.1 million households). The latter two episodes were watched by over 1 million more viewers than the network's second-highest-rated shows in their respective weeks.

=== Awards ===
Parker and Stone decided to submit "Margaritaville" for an Emmy Award because they had received a large amount of positive feedback about the episode from adult viewers. Since most Emmy voters are older, they decided "Margaritaville" stood the best chance of winning. Stone joked, "If an Emmy voter were to watch this, they might think the show was smarter than it was, so they might be fooled into voting for us." "Margaritaville" ultimately won the 2009 Emmy Award for Outstanding Animated Program for Programming Less Than One Hour against competing nominees Robot Chicken, The Simpsons and American Dad!. The victory marked the third consecutive Emmy win for South Park, which won in the same category in 2007 for the 10th season episode "Make Love, Not Warcraft", and won the award for Outstanding Animated Program for Programming One Hour or More for the 11th season episode "Imaginationland". Parker, Stone, Agnone, Stough, Beard, Howell, Rivinoja, Chatman, Hader and Quincy were all recipients of the Emmy.

In February 2010, "Whale Whores" was nominated for a Genesis Award in the television comedy category. The Genesis Awards honor news and entertainment media for outstanding work that raises public understanding of animal issues. "Whale Whores" ultimately lost to the Family Guy episode "Dog Gone."

== Home media ==
The season was released by Paramount Home Entertainment in the United States on March 16, 2010, on both DVD (as a three-disc set) and Blu-ray (as a two-disc set). Each set included all 14 uncensored episodes, with the bluray in 1080p video and Dolby TrueHD sound, as well as brief audio commentaries by Parker and Stone for each episode, seven deleted scenes, codes for unlocking a character and challenge levels in South Park Let's Go Tower Defense Play! on Xbox Live Arcade, and a special mini-feature, Inside Xbox: A Behind-the-Scenes Tour of South Park Studios, describing the show's animation process.

== See also ==
- South Park (Park County, Colorado)
- South Park City
