= Pippi =

Pippi may refer to:

- Pippi Longstocking, the main character in an eponymous series of children's books by the Swedish author Astrid Lindgren
- Pippi, a character in the video game Mother
- Pippi, the original Japanese name of Clefairy, a fictional species of Pokémon
- Damiano Pippi (born 1971), Italian volleyball player
- Pippi Zornoza (born 1978), American artist

== See also ==
- Pippy (disambiguation)
- Pipi (disambiguation)
