= Pippy =

Pippy may refer to:

- John Pippy (born 1970), American politician
- Jesse Pippy, American politician
- Katelyn Pippy, an American actress
- Pippy (character), a character in the film Bubble Boy
- Pippy (manga character), a character in Osamu Tezuka's Star System
- Pippy Park, urban park
- Pippy Poopypants, a villain in the book series Captain Underpants

== See also ==
- Pippi (disambiguation)
- Pipi (disambiguation)
- Puppy (disambiguation)
