= W.T.F. (South Park) =

- South Park episode
- Episode no.: Season 13; Episode 10
- Directed by: Trey Parker
- Written by: Trey Parker
- Production code: 1310
- Original air date: October 21, 2009

Episode chronology
| ← Previous "Butters' Bottom Bitch" | Next → "Whale Whores" |
- South Park season 13

"W.T.F." is the tenth episode of the thirteenth season of the American animated TV series South Park. The 191st episode overall in the series originally aired on Comedy Central in the USA on October 21, 2009. In the episode, the South Park boys form their own backyard wrestling league, drawing droves of fans who are more interested in the acting and scripted dramatic storylines than in the athletic elements.

"W.T.F." was written and directed by Trey Parker, and was rated TV-MA-L in the USA. The episode parodied several aspects of pro wrestling, highlighting the sport's emphasis on theatrical elements such as costumes, backstories, and scripted storylines. The episode demonstrated how amateur wrestling is often afforded less respect because of pro wrestling, and it presents pro wrestling fans as deluded rednecks while also likening them to middle-class theatergoers.

"W.T.F." specifically parodies WWE and its former chairman, Vince McMahon. The episode received generally mixed reviews, with several commentators calling professional wrestling an overly easy target for South Park satire. According to Nielsen ratings, "W.T.F." was seen by 1.37 million households among viewers aged between 18 and 49.

== Plot ==
After watching a live WWE match between Edge and John Cena at the Pepsi Center and being totally enthralled, Kyle, Stan, Cartman, Kenny, Butters, Jimmy and Token decide to join the school's wrestling team, unaware how different the sport is from pro wrestling. They all feel that the wrestling coach Mr. Connors's teaching of "real wrestling", or "wrassling", is too homoerotic and immediately quit the class to form their own BYW league called "the Wrestling Takedown Federation" (W.T.F.), much to the frustration of Mr. Connors. The boys' federation relies heavily on theatrical elements and scripted storylines, with such characters as a Russian who belittles Americans (played by Cartman), a veteran of the Vietnam War (played by Stan), and a girl who has had 14 abortions (also played by Cartman). Their audience grows quickly, and consists mostly of rednecks who believe the action and dialogue are real. As its popularity increases, the boys add an auditorium, complete with proscenium staging and theater-style lighting, to the back of Cartman's house. Soon, the events see the performers reciting dramatic monologues more often than engaging in wrestling and stunt work.

Mr. Connors is fired by the school board for the violence associated with wrestling, after the board fails to distinguish between what he teaches and pro wrestling (as do the town bar regulars). They also find videos of Greco-Roman and freestyle wrestling on his iPhone and mistake them for gay porn. The boys are excited to learn WWE Chairman Vince McMahon has heard of their federation and will be scouting one of their shows. Mr. Connors sits in his apartment, surrounded by wrestling awards, in tears over his termination and what wrestling has become. Vengeful, he plans to sabotage the event as a personal vow to restore the integrity of wrestling. Cartman, Stan, Kyle, and Kenny secretly decide to relegate Butters, Jimmy, and Token to smaller roles, thinking that it will give them a better opportunity to impress McMahon. They hold tryouts in the manner of a theater audition in order to find new talent for their show, which is now more reminiscent of musical theatre than wrestling.

Mr. Connors sneaks into the event and unsuccessfully attempts to destroy the wrestling ring with a rocket launcher, killing Kenny instead. He runs into the ring and chastises the crowd with an impassioned monologue about how pro wrestling has ruined real wrestling, and the downward spiral his life has taken since it cost him his job (as well as everything else). The crowd begins to sympathize with him, angrily chanting, "They took his job!." McMahon is impressed with the speech and decides to sign Mr. Connors to the WWE—much to his delight. The boys are frustrated at losing their latest shot at stardom and begin brawling amongst themselves, blaming each other for the lost opportunity. Unimpressed by the genuine wrestling and real conflicted drama, the crowd deems it "fake" and begins to leave.

== Theme ==
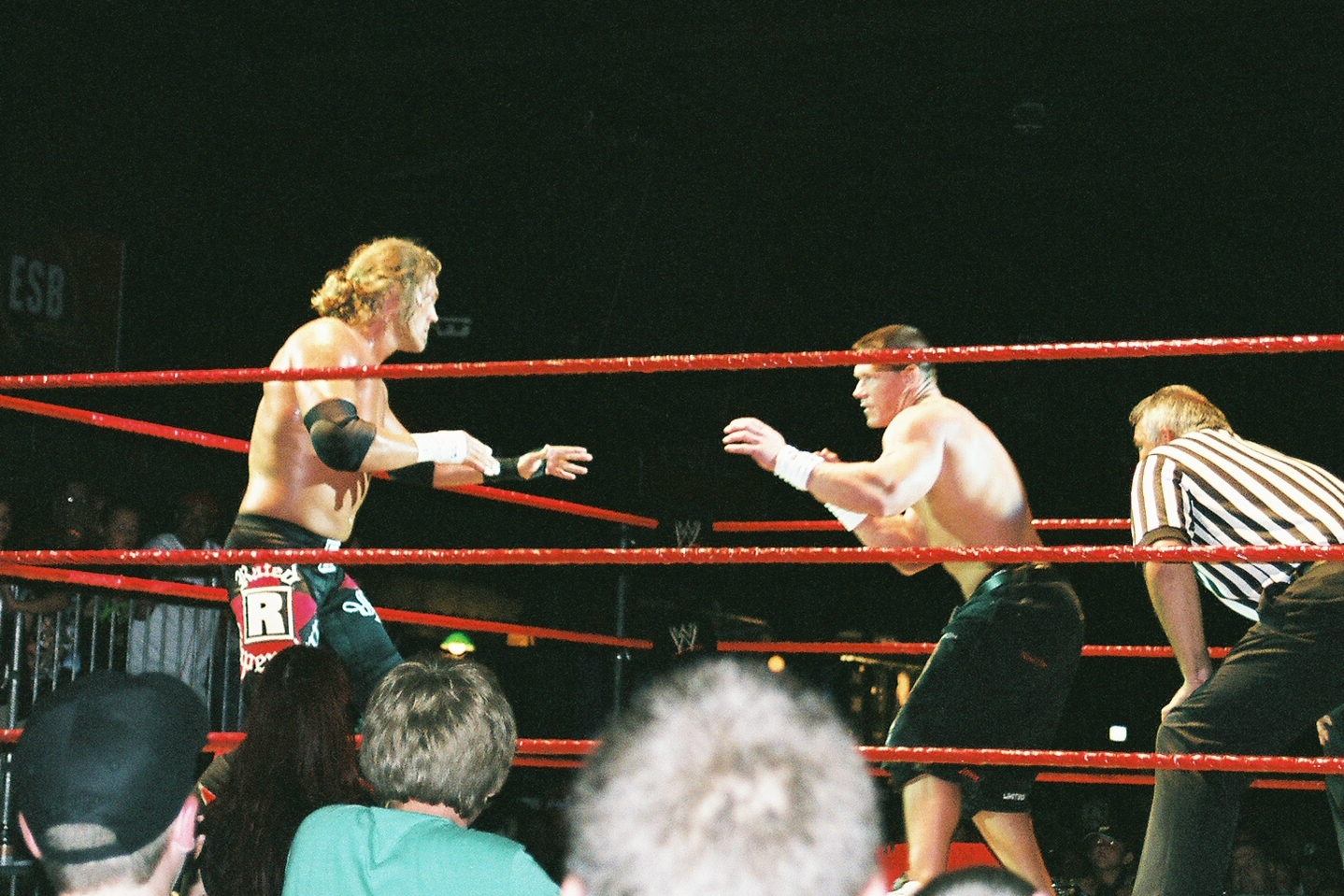
Professional wrestling in general, and the WWE in particular, are heavily spoofed in "W.T.F." John Cena (pictured second from right) and Edge (pictured left) are both referenced in the episode.

"W.T.F." was written and directed by series co-founder Trey Parker, and was rated TV-MA L in the USA. It first aired in the USA on October 21, 2009, on Comedy Central. "W.T.F." parodies several aspects of professional wrestling, a form of theatre involving mock combat and catch wrestling, in which matches, along with pre- and post-match commentary and action, are choreographed and scripted. The South Park episode highlights the theatrical elements of professional wrestling, such as costumes, backstories, and scripted dramatic storylines. The fans are portrayed as far more interested in these theatrical elements than any actual athletic feats. The theatrical aspect of professional wrestling is often overexaggerated in "W.T.F." to add comedic emphasis and satire. For example, a try-out involves no actual wrestling at all, but rather dramatic monologues, and resembles the audition scene from the Broadway musical "A Chorus Line". Similarly, Vince McMahon watches one of the matches from a balcony, wearing opera glasses, as in a theatre rather than a traditional wrestling venue.

"W.T.F." also demonstrates how amateur wrestling, an actual, non-choreographed sport with styles such as Greco-Roman and freestyle, is often afforded less respect because of pro wrestling. The boys initially mistake this form of wrestling for the scripted pro wrestling they are used to, and then are uninterested in it when they learn about the actual sport. The moves and holds their teacher tries to teach them are interpreted by the boys as homoerotic and treated with disrespect. The gym teacher, Mr. Connors, is portrayed as showing despair for what pro wrestling has done to harm "real wrestling", culminating in a final scene in which he makes a tearful rant to the crowd at one of the boys' wrestling matches.

"W.T.F." also mocks fans of pro wrestling, who are portrayed largely as stereotypical rednecks who believe the scripted storylines are real. The wrestling matches in "W.T.F." are purposely fake-looking to emphasize the scripted nature of pro wrestling, and utilize elements typically featured in real matches, like the use of metal folding chairs as weapons. The professional wrestling characters created by the South Park boys, such as Cartman's "the Rad Russian", are similar to the gimmick-based types of characters created by actual pro wrestling leagues, like The Iron Sheik. These characters, too, are portrayed in an over-the-top way to emphasize the comedic satire of pro wrestling. This is particularly illustrated with the use of one of Cartman's characters, a female diva who claims to have had so many abortions, she has become addicted to them.

== Cultural references ==
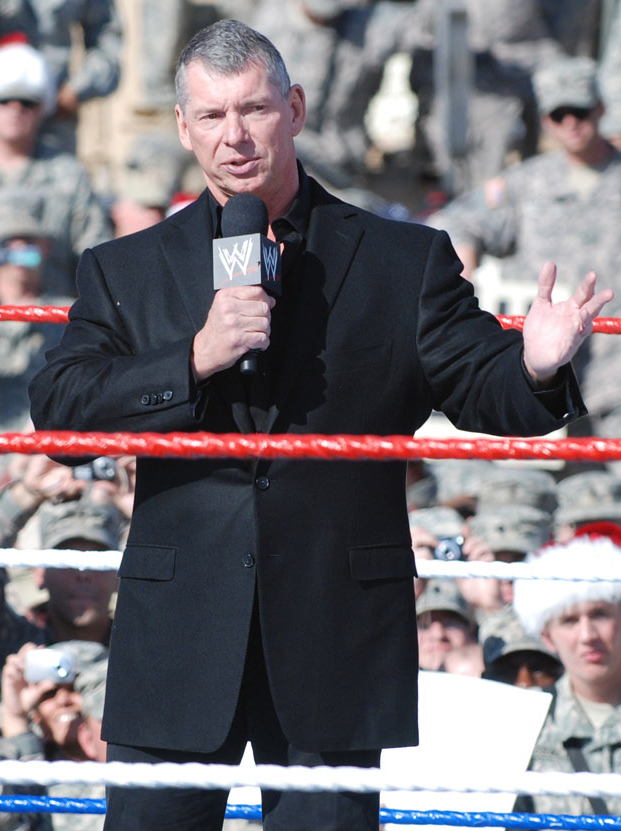
Former WWE chairman Vince McMahon (pictured) is parodied in "W.T.F."

Vince McMahon, in 2009 the chairman of WWE and occasional pro wrestler himself, is featured prominently in "W.T.F." Various aspects of the WWE company are featured in "W.T.F." John Cena and Edge, pro wrestlers who have both worked for the WWE, appear in a match against each other. Both are portrayed by voice actors, not the actual wrestlers themselves. The South Park boys host a "W.T.F. Smackdown" event, a reference to the TV program WWE SmackDown. Tolkien's W.T.F attire resembles the attire of WWE wrestler R-Truth. A wrestling try-out held by the boys resembles scenes from the Broadway musical A Chorus Line, which involves Broadway dancers auditioning for spots on a chorus line. One of the people trying out sings a musical number about why he wants to be a wrestler, which parodies the song "Nothing" from A Chorus Line. The episode also includes references to the musical Fame, the film Waiting for Guffman and the reality TV series American Idol. When Cartman and Kenny order a meeting with Stan and Kyle to discuss the wrestling league, they meet at a Sizzler, a steak-and-seafood restaurant chain.

== Reception ==
In its original American broadcast on October 21, 2009, "W.T.F" was watched by 1.37 million households among viewers aged 18 to 34, according to Nielsen ratings. Among that age group, it ranked behind the FX drama series Sons of Anarchy, which drew 1.43 million household viewers, as well as game five of the 2009 NLCS on TBS (1.56 million households) and an NFL game between the Broncos and Chargers on ESPN (3.57 million households).

"Like the wrestling it mocks, "W.T.F." starts out as hilarious and brilliant, but soon drifts into average territory before becoming absurd to the point of boring. As a total package, "W.T.F." winds up evening out as an average South Park episode."

— Carlos Delgado
iF magazine

"W.T.F." received generally mixed reviews. Ramsey Isler of IGN said the pro wrestling parody was "pretty spot on", but that the target was too easy, and the episode "lacks a lot of the punchy kind of comedy that the show is usually known for". Nevertheless, Isler said the writing was clever and had funny moments, such as Kenny's "El Pollo Loco" character and the scene where the gym teacher tries to take down a security guard with a traditional wrestling move. Josh Modell of The A.V. Club gave the episode a C+ grade and called it "one of those too-common SP episodes that could've been cut in half". Modell said the true-to-life way the boys formed their wrestling company was "great" and that the parody of pro wrestling was on target, but also said they "have been told a million times before. They're not really jokes at this point."

Carlos Delgado of iF Magazine gave the episode a C+ grade, saying pro wrestling seems like a topic South Park should have mocked long ago. Delgado said the best scenes were the first moments of the boys' wrestling league, but that the "novelty of the idea starts to fade" and the developments become too outrageous. Maclean's writer Jamie Weinman criticized the episode and said pro wrestling was "not exactly a timely target". Not all reviews were negative. Salon.com writer Mary Elizabeth Williams called the show "perennially offensive [and] still shockingly funny", and particularly praised Cartman's wrestling character "Bad Irene", who professes a love of and addiction to abortions. Williams called it, "a reminder that the heated debate over choice frequently serves as America's prime-time entertainment".

== Home release ==
"W.T.F.", along with the thirteen other episodes from South Park's thirteenth season, were released on a three-disc DVD set and two-disc Blu-ray set in the United States on March 16, 2010. The sets included brief audio commentaries by Parker and Stone for each episode, a collection of deleted scenes, and a special mini-feature Inside Xbox: A Behind-the-Scenes Tour of South Park Studios, which discussed the process behind animating the show with Inside xBox host Major Nelson.
