= Pipis =

Pipis may refer to:

== People ==
- Athanasios Pipis (died 1821), Greek commander in the Greek War of Independence
- Giannos Pipis (born 1966), Cypriot skier

=== Fictional characters ===
- Pipis, an object and enemy from the video game Deltarune
- Ms. Pipis, a rare variant of Pipis wearing a pink ribbon

== Other uses ==
- Berkaber, Tavush, Armenia; a village formerly known as Pipis
- Saurita pipis, a moth

== See also ==
- Pipi (disambiguation), for the singular of pipis
