= Pup =

Pup is a name for a young animal, such as a puppy.

Pup or Pups may also refer to:

== Places ==
- Pup Cove, South Orkney Islands, Antarctica
- Pup Creek, Kentucky, United States
- Pup Rock, Graham Land, Antarctica
- Punjabi University, Patiala(PUP), State of Punjab

== People ==
- Michael Clarke (cricketer), Australian cricketer nicknamed "Pup"
- Pup Phillips (1895–1953), American football player and coach
- Nisn Pups, Soviet Lithuanian-Jewish revolutionary, journalist and trade unionist

== Aircraft ==
- Beagle Pup, a 1960s British light aircraft
- Dart Pup, a one-off British monoplane first flown in 1936
- Keystone NK or Pup, a US Navy two-seat biplane trainer introduced in 1930
- Preceptor N3 Pup, a family of ultralight homebuilt aircraft
- Pup, a variant of the Aviat Husky light utility aircraft
- Sopwith Pup, an aircraft used by the British in World War I

== Art, entertainment, and media ==
- PUP (band), Canadian punk band based out of Toronto
- Pups (film), a 1999 film starring Burt Reynolds

== Science ==
- Prokaryotic ubiquitin-like protein
- Puppis, abbreviated "Pup", a constellation
- Sirius B, a white dwarf star affectionately known as "the Pup"

== Other uses ==
- pup, ISO 639-3 code for the Pulabu language of Papua New Guinea
- Crosley Pup, a low-cost AM radio introduced in 1925
- Pup tent, an older tent style
- Potentially unwanted program, a category of generally harmless software installed on a system without user consent or with nefarious intent

== See also ==
- PUP (disambiguation)
- Puppy (disambiguation)
