= Peepee =

Peepee or Pee Pee may refer to:

- Slang for penis (usually the human penis), urine or urination (primarily with young children)
- Pee Pee Creek, a stream in Ohio
- Pee Pee Island, island in Newfoundland
- Pee Pee Township, Pike County, Ohio
- Dr. PeePee, former alias of Kevin "PPMD" Nanney, professional Super Smash Bros. Melee player
- "Pee Pee", a song by M Huncho from the album Huncholini the 1st (2020)

== See also ==
- PP (disambiguation)
- Peepeekisis Cree Nation
- Pee (disambiguation)
- Pipi (disambiguation)
