= Pipi Natural Bridge =

The Pipi Natural Bridge is geological formation near Ouadda in the Haute-Kotto prefecture of the Central African Republic in which the Pipi River, a tributary of the Kotto River, has carved out a gorge in the sandstone terrain forming a natural arch. The sandstone arch is a single slab of sandstone, whose top is nearly 9 m (30 ft) above the water level. Although it is not known how it was formed, the surrounding terrain offers some clues. It is suspected that the top of the bridge was once part of the river bottom itself, as both the bridge and the current river bottom bear similar potholes. Upstream, rocky projections on the walls of the river gorge seem to suggest that a once-extant tunnel collapsed there. It has been suggested that the Pipi Natural Bridge is all that remains of that former tunnel.
