= Pee =

Pee or PEE may refer to:

== Arts and entertainment ==
- P.E.E., a math rock band from San Francisco (formed 1993)
- "Pee" (South Park), a 2009 TV episode
- Pochonbo Electronic Ensemble, a North Korean electronica group (formed 1985)

== Places ==
- Peeblesshire, a historic county in Scotland (Chapman code: PEE)
- Perm International Airport, Russia (IATA code: PEE)

== Other uses ==
- Urine, excreta
- Urination, or peeing
- Penny or pence, in currency

== See also ==
- Peepee (disambiguation)
