= Larry Hryb =

American programming director and podcaster

- Hryb in 2009
- Born: Lawrence Hryb
- Other name: Major Nelson
- Education: Syracuse University
- Occupation: Community Development Advisor at Commodore International
- Known for: Host of "Major Nelson Radio"
- Website: www.majornelson.com

Lawrence Hryb (/ˈhɜːrb/), also known as Major Nelson, is an American executive best known as the director of programming for Xbox Live from 2005 until 2023. He later served the director of community of Unity Technologies. He is further known for his Xbox profile by the same name of 'Major Nelson'. His blog "Xbox Live's Major Nelson" provided an inside look at operations at Microsoft's Xbox division. Prior to joining Microsoft in 2001, he was a former programmer and on air host with radio broadcaster Clear Channel Communications.

== Education ==
Hryb graduated from Syracuse University with a degree in Television, Radio and Film production from the S.I. Newhouse School of Public Communications.

== Career ==
=== Xbox ===
Hryb worked as the Director of Promotions for Clear Channel Communications in Hartford, Connecticut for WKSS from 1989 to late 2000. In early 2001, he began working with Microsoft; his first role at the company was as the editor in chief of MSN music. Hryb moved into Xbox division of Microsoft in 2003. Hryb was instrumental in the development of the Xbox One, Xbox 360, Xbox LIVE, Kinect and the 'New Xbox Experience'.

Hryb picked the Gamertag "Major Nelson" after a character by the same name on the 1960s U.S. television comedy I Dream of Jeannie after it was recommended to him by his TiVo. Hryb dedicated his Gamertag to Larry Hagman (the actor who played Major Nelson) after his death in 2012.

Hryb has advised dozens of gaming and non-gaming companies and communities on how to best engage with their audiences using digital tools and social networks. In 2012, he was named one of Mashable's '13 Bona Fide Geeks to Follow'. Hryb performs product reviews and mentions through his various social media outlets - Twitter, his podcast, Google Plus page, YouTube profile, and his personal blog - for lifestyle-related products and services.

In July 2023, Hryb announced he had decided to "take a step back and work on the next chapter of my career." He thanked fans and colleagues and said the Official Xbox Podcast would return with a new format after its summer hiatus.

==== Major Nelson Radio podcast ====
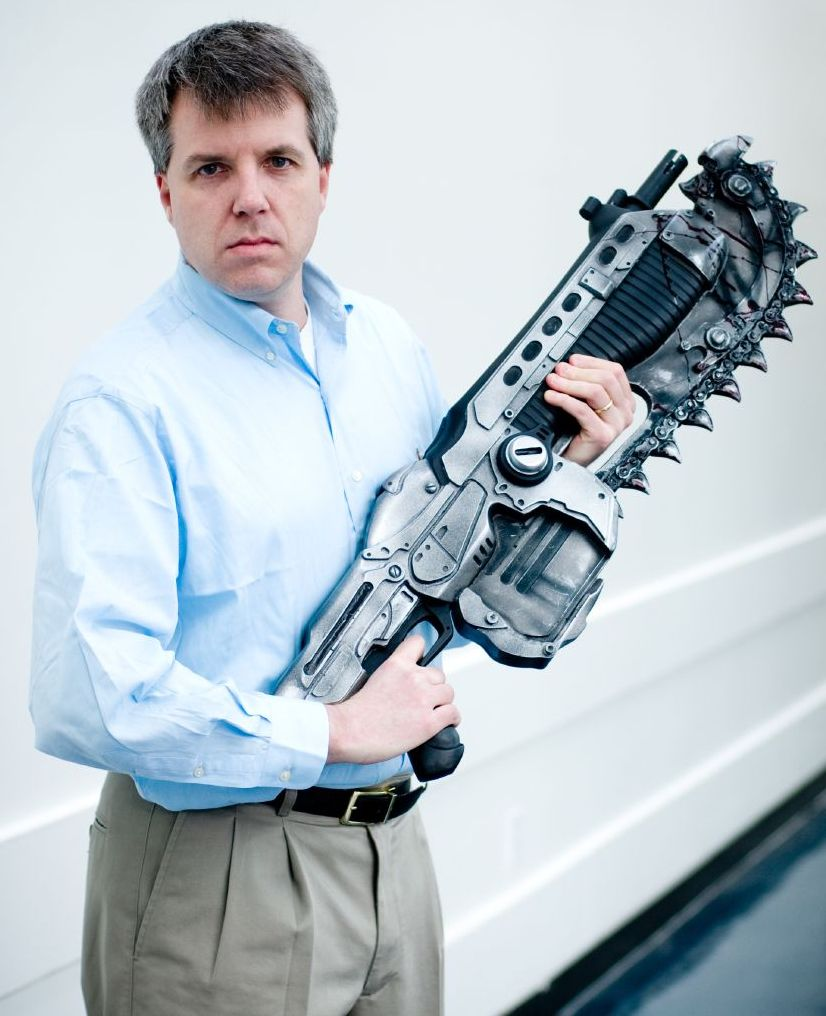
Hryb with the Lancer rifle from Gears of War, 2008

Hryb is most known for his popular weekly podcast "Major Nelson Radio", available on iTunes, Xbox Music Marketplace, and from his site. He does interviews as well. Direct from inside the Microsoft Xbox team, Hryb and his colleagues including regular co-hosts Laura Massey ("lollip0p"), and Eric Neustadter ("e") discuss Xbox One, Xbox 360, Kinect, Zune, gaming, technology, other next generation consoles (including the PlayStation 4, and Wii U), among other subjects. His show regularly hosts interviews with people in the gaming community, and offers prizes to listeners through his "Name the Game" contest, where he plays a short audio clip from a game, and a winner is drawn from the correct entries. Additionally, regular features of the podcast include "Xbox 101", a segment devoted to various features on the Xbox One or Xbox Live, Gadget discussion where they discuss the latest and greatest gadget. Many companies have contacted Larry to review or cover their products to reach this audience, but Larry has declined stating that he only wants to talk about products he actually uses and are of high quality and value. Recently, as convergence takes place with the auto industry, they have also started looking at vehicles that use technology in a new and exciting ways.

Originally, Hryb produced the podcast by himself. The podcast used to consist of him giving a monologue and breaking to play prerecorded interviews. On November 6, 2006, he celebrated his '200th' podcast, which was marked with a nearly two and a half hour show. Hryb openly admits that he added to the show number and the figure doesn't accurately reflect the number of shows made. Hryb switched to a #1xx numbering around July 18, 2005, when he did show #136 after the previous '7/10/05 Blogcast'. Major Nelson was interviewed on the Video Game Outsiders Podcast (show #50), where he commented "About a year and a half ago, I started numbering my shows at 100...it makes it sound cooler, bigger numbers are always better."

=== Unity ===
In June 2024, Hryb announced he would lead Unity Technologies's community department.

Hryb was among those let go in layoffs at Unity in January 2026.

=== Commodore International ===
In March 2026, Hryb was announced as a community development advisor at Commodore International

== Personal life ==
Hryb is married to Taylor Johnson, the author of The Happy Girl blog, and lives in the state of Washington. During Show 478 of the Major Nelson podcast he expressed interest in classical music, noting that he nearly minored in it during his college studies. In 2006, Next Generation Magazine named Hryb one of the "Top 25 People of the Year" in video gaming. Also, in 2009 he was featured on Wired.com's "100 Geeks You Should Be Following On Twitter". Hryb has worked with multiple Fortune 500 companies, advising them on how to use social media to better connect with the community. He revealed that his guilty pleasure is KFC mashed potatoes.
