= Elementary School Musical (South Park) =

- South Park episode
- Episode no.: Season 12; Episode 13
- Directed by: Trey Parker
- Written by: Trey Parker
- Production code: 1213
- Original air date: November 12, 2008

Episode chronology
← Previous "About Last Night..."	Next → "The Ungroundable"
- South Park season 12

"Elementary School Musical" is the thirteenth episode of the twelfth season of the animated series South Park, and the 180th episode of the series overall. It originally aired on Comedy Central in the United States on November 12, 2008. In the episode, a new boy at school helps set off an impromptu-singing-and-dancing craze that the boys vow to never go along with, dragging them down into the dregs of unpopularity.

The episode was written and directed by series co-creator Trey Parker, and was rated TV-MA L in the United States. The episode is a parody of the High School Musical film series.

== Plot ==
Stan Marsh, Kyle Broflovski, Eric Cartman and Kenny McCormick realize that, apart from them, everyone at school has bought into the newest fad, the High School Musical film series. The four boys repeatedly witness the rest of South Park Elementary collectively break into song, in the spirit of the musical films. Unaware of what High School Musical is, the boys watch one of the films, but dislike it, and vow never to become a part of this fad. Cartman decides to commit suicide by inducing carbon monoxide poisoning while sleeping under his mother's car (with the engine turned on) but it fails since hybrid cars do not "do the trick anymore".

Stan fears that Wendy Testaburger is becoming close with a popular third-grader named Bridon Gueermo (a parody of Zac Efron's character Troy in High School Musical voiced by Trey Parker), because they tend to share lead roles in the musical routines. Stan talks to Bridon in hopes of directing him away from Wendy, and finds out Bridon would prefer to play basketball instead of singing. It is revealed that Bridon only sings and dances because his theater-crazed, flamboyant metrosexual father (also voiced by Parker) forces him to do it. Stan pressures him to try out with the basketball team anyway. Although Mr. Gueermo is shown to be abusive to his family (though only capable of light, effeminate slaps), He even slaps the Basketball coach, Mr. Mackey and 2 people who Stan called to talk to Bridon about his problem. Bridon eventually stands up for himself (punching his father in the face), and joins the team.

Meanwhile, unhappy at becoming an outcast in school, Stan decides to join the trend and studies the High School Musical series intensively, despite having vowed against it. He convinces Kyle, Cartman and Kenny that the world has changed, and they cannot go against the tide anymore. The next day at school, the four boys perform a song along with an equally elaborate dance routine about the importance of following one's dreams. However, upon learning that Bridon has joined the basketball team, everyone else is uninterested and leaves during the boys' performance to watch Bridon play basketball instead. The four kids learn that the rest of the school just liked Bridon for his looks and charisma and not the fad itself.

== Production ==
"Elementary School Musical" was one of dozens of South Park episodes developed the Thursday before broadcast during a writer's meeting. High School Musical 3: Senior Year had opened in theaters several weeks before and was a national hot topic; the team had previously mentioned the series as a target for satire. The initial idea the episode was based on was that everyone in South Park is singing High School Musical-style numbers, except for the four main boys. Series co-creator Trey Parker joked during the meeting that his objective for the next week would be to write a full-blown musical. The writers returned to the idea not long afterward, and the episode was put into production.

Parker and Stone watched the High School Musical movies during the development of the show. The previous episode of the series, "About Last Night...", had required the duo to view the Ocean's Eleven series in preparation, which they later remarked was an easier, more enjoyable task. Upon the realization that the songs in the High School Musical series appear disconnected from the plot, Parker found it easier to write fodder songs in one week. Stone commented that the episode's story structure is unique in that characters are set up to make a decision, but the audience does not see that decision being made, and the story rather cuts to the aftermath of the decision. This is particularly evident in the episode's final moments, in which the audience never sees the boys preparing their musical number, but are surprised with it at the end. Parker and Stone noted that this structure was further explored in the next episode of the season, "The Ungroundable".

Stone noted that the children depicted in South Park are fourth graders, the target audience for the Disney films. He spoke in the episode's DVD commentary on how kids at that age tend to watch television in which characters are older and often adolescents. Parker and Stone both admitted their favorite part of the episode were scenes in which Bridon Gueermo's father commands the lead, as they found his character, with his slapping abuse, very amusing.

== Cultural references ==
The episode is a satire of the High School Musical series; when the boys watch the film in an attempt to understand the phenomenon, a parody of a song from the original film "Stick to the Status Quo," is heard. When asked where the boys have been to be unaware of the High School Musical craze, Craig responds "Peru"; this is a reference to episodes from earlier in season, "Pandemic" and "Pandemic 2: The Startling", in which the boys travel to the country of Peru.

During Bridon's basketball game, his father is swayed by the "jock jam" music played over the loud speakers, which includes the music of Queen and Gary Glitter. When Stan is pressured to sing a song in the episode, he turns to the only songs he knows: the standards "Someone's In The Kitchen With Dinah", "Go Tell Aunt Rhody" and "Happy Birthday".

At the end of the show, Kenny is seen wearing a Rolling Stones shirt.

== Reception ==
Travis Fickett of IGN commented that the episode "doesn't make as much of the idea as it could" and rated the episode at 7.5 out of 10. 411mania's DC Perry rated it at 7.4 out of 10 compared it favorably to other episodes of the season, but wrote that "[b]eing one of the best episodes of this season isn't really an accomplishment ... It just feels like they're running out of ideas." Sean O'Neal of The A.V. Club gave the episode a 'B+' rating, describing it as a "silly-smart episode that nevertheless ranks as one of the standouts from what's proven to be a very hit-or-miss season".

== Home release ==
"Elementary School Musical", along with the thirteen other episodes from South Park's twelfth season, were released on a three-disc DVD set and two-disc Blu-ray set in the United States on March 10, 2009. The sets included brief audio commentaries by Parker and Stone for each episode, a collection of deleted scenes, and two special mini-features, The Making of 'Major Boobage and Six Days to South Park.
