= Political correctness =

Measures to avoid offense or disadvantage

Political correctness (adjectivally "politically correct"; commonly abbreviated to P.C.) is a term used to describe language, policies, or measures that are intended to avoid offense or disadvantage to members of particular groups in society. Since the late 1980s, the term has been used to describe a preference for inclusive language and avoidance of language or behavior that can be seen as excluding, marginalizing, or insulting to groups of people disadvantaged or discriminated against, particularly groups defined by ethnicity, sex, gender, sexual orientation, or disability. In public discourse and the media, the term's use is generally pejorative, with an implication that these policies are excessive or unwarranted. Its use can also be humorous or ironic in nature.

The phrase politically correct first appeared in the 1930s, when it was used to describe dogmatic adherence to ideology in totalitarian regimes, such as Nazi Germany and Soviet Russia. Early usage of the term politically correct by leftists in the 1970s and 1980s was as self-critical satire; usage was ironic, rather than a name for a serious political movement. It was considered an in-joke among leftists used to satirise those who were too rigid in their adherence to political orthodoxy. The modern pejorative usage of the term emerged from conservative criticism of the New Left in the late 20th century, with many describing it as a form of censorship.

Commentators on the political left in the United States contend that conservatives use the concept of political correctness to downplay and divert attention from substantively discriminatory behavior against disadvantaged groups. They also argue that the political right enforces its own forms of political correctness to suppress criticism of its favored constituencies and ideologies. In the United States, the term has played a major role in the culture war between liberals and conservatives.

== Conceptual background ==
Several researchers describe political correctness not only as a political label but also as a practice of linguistic reform aimed at reducing exclusionary or derogatory expressions in public language, often in line with egalitarian or inclusive norms. Geoffrey Hughes and Norman Fairclough both note that these language reforms are intertwined with broader social efforts to reshape public discourse and social relations.

== History ==
=== Early to mid-20th century ===
In the early to mid-20th century, the phrase politically correct was used to describe strict adherence to a range of ideological orthodoxies within politics. In 1934, The New York Times reported that Nazi Germany was granting reporting permits "only to pure 'Aryans' whose opinions are politically correct".

The term political correctness first appeared in Marxist–Leninist vocabulary following the Russian Revolution of 1917. At that time, it was used to describe strict adherence to the policies and principles of the Communist Party of the Soviet Union, that is, the party line. Later in the United States, the phrase came to be associated with accusations of dogmatism in debates between communists and socialists. According to American educator Herbert Kohl, writing about debates in New York in the late 1940s and early 1950s:

The term "politically correct" was used disparagingly, to refer to someone whose loyalty to the CP line overrode compassion, and led to bad politics. It was used by Socialists against Communists, and was meant to separate out Socialists who believed in egalitarian moral ideas from dogmatic Communists who would advocate and defend party positions regardless of their moral substance.

— "Uncommon Differences", The Lion and the Unicorn

=== 1970s ===
In the 1970s, the American New Left began using the term politically correct. In the essay The Black Woman: An Anthology (1970), Toni Cade Bambara said that "a man cannot be politically correct and a [male] chauvinist, too". William Safire records this as the first use in the typical modern sense. The term political correctness was believed to have been revived by the New Left through familiarity in the West with Mao's Little Red Book, in which Mao stressed holding to the correct party line. The term rapidly began to be used by the New Left in an ironic or self-deprecating sense.

Thereafter, the term was often used as self-critical satire. Debra L. Shultz said that "throughout the 1970s and 1980s, the New Left, feminists, and progressives... used their term 'politically correct' ironically, as a guard against their own orthodoxy in social change efforts". PC is used in the comic book Merton of the Movement, by Bobby London, which was followed by the term ideologically sound, in the comic strips of Bart Dickon. In her essay "Toward a feminist Revolution" (1992) Ellen Willis said, "In the early eighties, when feminists used the term 'political correctness', it was used to refer sarcastically to the anti-pornography movement's efforts to define a 'feminist sexuality'."

Stuart Hall suggests one way in which the original use of the term may have developed into the modern one:

According to one version, political correctness actually began as an in-joke on the left: radical students on American campuses acting out an ironic replay of the Bad Old Days BS (Before the Sixties) when every revolutionary groupuscule had a party line about everything. They would address some glaring examples of sexist or racist behaviour by their fellow students in imitation of the tone of voice of the Red Guards or Cultural Revolution Commissar: "Not very 'politically correct', Comrade!"

=== 1980s and 1990s ===
Allan Bloom's The Closing of the American Mind, a book first published in 1987, heralded a debate about political correctness in American higher education in the 1980s and 1990s. Professor of English literary and cultural studies at CMU Jeffrey J. Williams wrote that the "assault on ... political correctness that simmered through the Reagan years, gained bestsellerdom with Bloom's Closing of the American Mind". According to Z.F. Gamson, Bloom's book "attacked the faculty for 'political correctness'". Sociologist Anthony Platt says the "campaign against 'political correctness'" was launched by Bloom's book in 1987.

An October 1990 New York Times article by Richard Bernstein is credited with popularizing the term. At this time, the term was mainly being used within academia: "Across the country the term p.c., as it is commonly abbreviated, is being heard more and more in debates over what should be taught at the universities." Nexis citations in "arcnews/curnews" reveal only seventy total citations in articles to "political correctness" for 1990; but one year later, Nexis records 1,532 citations, with a steady increase to more than 7,000 citations by 1994. In May 1991, The New York Times had a follow-up article, according to which the term was increasingly being used in a wider public arena:

What has come to be called "political correctness", a term that began to gain currency at the start of the academic year last fall, has spread in recent months and has become the focus of an angry national debate, mainly on campuses, but also in the larger arenas of American life.

— Robert D. McFadden, "Political Correctness: New Bias Test?", 1991

The previously obscure far-left term became common currency in the lexicon of the conservative social and political challenges against progressive teaching methods and curriculum changes in the secondary schools and universities of the U.S. Policies, behavior, and speech codes that the speaker or the writer regarded as being the imposition of a liberal orthodoxy, were described and criticized as politically correct. In May 1991, at a commencement ceremony for a graduating class of the University of Michigan, then U.S. President George H. W. Bush used the term in his speech: "The notion of political correctness has ignited controversy across the land. And although the movement arises from the laudable desire to sweep away the debris of racism and sexism and hatred, it replaces old prejudice with new ones. It declares certain topics off-limits, certain expression off-limits, even certain gestures off-limits."

After 1991, its use as a pejorative phrase became widespread amongst conservatives in the US. It became a key term encapsulating conservative concerns about the left in cultural and political debates extending beyond academia. Two articles on the topic in late 1990 in Forbes and Newsweek both used the term "thought police" in their headlines, exemplifying the tone of the new usage, but it was Dinesh D'Souza's Illiberal Education: The Politics of Race and Sex on Campus (1991) which "captured the press's imagination". These trends were at least in part a response to multiculturalism and the rise of identity politics, with movements such as feminism, gay rights movements and ethnic minority movements. That response received funding from conservative foundations and think tanks such as the John M. Olin Foundation, which funded several books such as D'Souza's.

Herbert Kohl, in 1992, commented that a number of neoconservatives who promoted the use of the term "politically correct" in the early 1990s were former Communist Party members, and, as a result, familiar with the Marxist use of the phrase. He argued that in doing so, they intended "to insinuate that egalitarian democratic ideas are actually authoritarian, orthodox, and Communist-influenced, when they oppose the right of people to be racist, sexist, and homophobic".

During the 1990s, conservative and right-wing politicians, think tanks, and speakers adopted the phrase as a pejorative descriptor of their ideological enemies, especially in the context of the culture wars about language and the content of public-school curricula. Roger Kimball, in Tenured Radicals, endorsed Frederick Crews's view that PC is best described as "Left Eclecticism", a term defined by Kimball as "any of a wide variety of anti-establishment modes of thought from structuralism and poststructuralism, deconstruction, and Lacanian analyst to feminist, homosexual, black, and other patently political forms of criticism".

Liberal commentators have argued that the conservatives and reactionaries who used the term did so in an effort to divert political discussion away from the substantive matters of resolving societal discrimination, such as racial, social class, gender, and legal inequality, against people whom conservatives do not consider part of the social mainstream. Jan Narveson wrote that "that phrase was born to live between scare-quotes: it suggests that the operative considerations in the area so called are merely political, steamrolling the genuine reasons of principle for which we ought to be acting...". Commenting in 2001, one such British journalist, Polly Toynbee, said "the phrase is an empty, right-wing smear, designed only to elevate its user", and in 2010 she wrote "the phrase 'political correctness' was born as a coded cover for all who still want to say Paki, spastic, or queer". Another British journalist, Will Hutton, wrote in 2001:

Political correctness is one of the brilliant tools that the American Right developed in the mid–1980s, as part of its demolition of American liberalism.... What the sharpest thinkers on the American Right saw quickly was that by declaring war on the cultural manifestations of liberalism – by levelling the charge of "political correctness" against its exponents – they could discredit the whole political project.

— Will Hutton, "Words Really are Important, Mr Blunkett", 2001

Glenn Loury wrote in 1994 that to address the subject of "political correctness" when power and authority within the academic community is being contested by parties on either side of that issue, is to invite scrutiny of one's arguments by would-be "friends" and "enemies". Combatants from the left and the right will try to assess whether a writer is "for them" or "against them". Geoffrey Hughes suggested that debate over political correctness concerns whether changing language actually solves political and social problems, with critics viewing it less about solving problems than imposing censorship, intellectual intimidation and demonstrating the moral purity of those who practice it. Hughes also argues that political correctness tends to be pushed by a minority rather than an organic form of language change.

=== Right-wing political correctness ===
"Political correctness" is a label typically used to describe liberal or left-wing terms and actions but rarely used for analogous attempts to mold language and behavior on the right. Alex Nowrasteh of the Cato Institute referred to the right's own version of political correctness as "patriotic correctness".

=== As a socio-linguistic phenomenon ===
In subsequent academic scholarship, some scholars have examined political correctness as a form of linguistic and moral reform. Linguist Geoffrey Hughes described political correctness as "liberal in its aims but often illiberal in its practices," identifying a tension between its reformist intentions and its perceived coerciveness. Similarly, Norman Fairclough has analyzed political correctness as part of a broader discourse of linguistic and moral reform, in which "changing language practices is part of changing social relations" and "critical awareness of language" is linked to the pursuit of "fairness and inclusiveness".

== Public perceptions and self-censorship ==
Public opinion research indicate that the term “politically correct” continues to function as a reference point in contemporary debates about acceptable expression. A 2021 YouGov poll reported by the BBC found that 57% of respondents said they self-censor their views on issues such as immigration, particularly when their opinions are “deemed at the less politically correct end of the spectrum.”

Commentators have connected these perceptions to broader concerns about self-censorship, social sanctioning, and contested norms of speech in public life.

== Usage ==
The modern pejorative usage of the term emerged from conservative criticism of the New Left in the late 20th century. This usage was popularized by a number of articles in The New York Times and other media throughout the 1990s, and was widely used in the debate surrounding Allan Bloom's 1987 book The Closing of the American Mind. The term gained further currency in response to Roger Kimball's Tenured Radicals (1990), and conservative author Dinesh D'Souza's 1991 book Illiberal Education. Supporters of politically correct language have been pejoratively referred to as the "language police".

=== Education ===
Modern debate on the term was sparked by conservative critiques of perceived liberal bias in academia and education, and conservatives have since used it as a major line of attack.

Preliminary research published in 2020 indicated that students at a large U.S. public university generally felt instructors were open-minded and encouraged free expression of diverse viewpoints; nonetheless, most students worried about the consequences of voicing their political opinions, with "[a]nxieties about expressing political views and self-censorship ... more prevalent among students who identify as conservative".

=== As a conspiracy theory ===
Some conservative commentators in the West argue that "political correctness" and multiculturalism are part of a conspiracy with the ultimate goal of undermining Judeo-Christian values. This theory, which holds that political correctness originates from the critical theory of the Frankfurt School as part of a conspiracy that its proponents call "Cultural Marxism". The theory originated with Michael Minnicino's 1992 essay "New Dark Age: Frankfurt School and 'Political Correctness'", published in a Lyndon LaRouche movement journal. In 2001, conservative commentator Patrick Buchanan wrote in The Death of the West that "political correctness is cultural Marxism", and that "its trademark is intolerance".

=== Media ===
In the US, the term has been widely used in books and journals, but in Britain the usage has been confined mainly to the popular press. Many such authors and popular-media figures, particularly on the right, have used the term to criticize what they see as bias in the media. William McGowan argues that journalists get stories wrong or ignore stories worthy of coverage, because of what McGowan perceives to be their liberal ideologies and their fear of offending minority groups. Robert Novak, in his essay "Political Correctness Has No Place in the Newsroom", used the term to blame newspapers for adopting language use policies that he thinks tend to excessively avoid the appearance of bias. He argued that political correctness in language not only destroys meaning but also demeans the people who are meant to be protected.

Authors David Sloan and Emily Hoff claim that in the US, journalists shrug off concerns about political correctness in the newsroom, equating the political correctness criticisms with the old "liberal media bias" label. According to author John Wilson, left-wing forces of "political correctness" have been blamed for unrelated censorship, with Time citing campaigns against violence on network television in the US as contributing to a "mainstream culture [that] has become cautious, sanitized, scared of its own shadow" because of "the watchful eye of the p.c. police", protests and advertiser boycotts targeting TV shows are generally organized by right-wing religious groups campaigning against violence, sex, and depictions of homosexuality on television.

=== Inclusive language ===
Inclusive or Equity Language is a language style that avoids expressions that its proponents perceive as expressing or implying ideas that are sexist, racist, or otherwise biased, prejudiced, or insulting to any particular group of people; and instead uses language intended to avoid offense and fulfill the ideals of egalitarianism. This language style is sometimes referred to as a type of "political correctness", either as a neutral description or with negative connotations by its opponents. At least some supporters deny an association between the two ("Political correctness is focused on not offending whereas inclusive language is focused on honoring people's identities.").

=== Satirical use ===
Political correctness is often satirized, for example in The PC Manifesto (1992) by Saul Jerushalmy and Rens Zbignieuw X, and Politically Correct Bedtime Stories (1994) by James Finn Garner, which presents fairy tales re-written from an exaggerated politically correct perspective. In 1994, the comedy film PCU took a look at political correctness on a college campus. Other examples include the television program Politically Incorrect, George Carlin's "Euphemisms" routine, and The Politically Correct Scrapbook. The popularity of the South Park cartoon program led to the creation of the term "South Park Republican" by Andrew Sullivan, and later the book South Park Conservatives by Brian C. Anderson. In its Season 19 (2015), South Park introduced the character PC Principal, who embodies the principle, to poke fun at the principle of political correctness.

The Colbert Report's host Stephen Colbert often talked, satirically, about the "PC Police".

=== Science ===
Groups who oppose certain generally accepted scientific views about evolution, second-hand tobacco smoke, AIDS, climate change, race and other politically contentious scientific matters have used the term political correctness to describe what they view as unwarranted rejection of their perspective on these issues by a scientific community that they believe has been corrupted by liberal politics.

== See also ==
- Agenda-setting theory – Ability of the mass media to influence the public agenda of a society
- Anti-bias curriculum – Educational plan meant to reduce perceived prejudice in education
- Binnen-I – Style for gender-neutral written German
- Cancel culture – Modern form of social rejection
- Christmas controversies – Christmas ideological, political and religious disputes
- Cordon sanitaire (politics) – Political term
- Cultural Bolshevism – Nazi slogan opposing modernist and progressive cultural movements
- Cultural Marxism – Far-right antisemitic conspiracy theory
- Distancing language – Phrasing technique which disassociates speaker from subject
- Doublethink – Concept in Nineteen Eighty-Four of accepting two contradictory statements
- Framing (social sciences) – Effect of how information is presented on perception
- Groupthink – Psychological phenomenon that occurs within a group of people
- Gutmensch – Pejorative German term for a sanctimonious do-gooder
- Hate speech – Speech that expresses hatred towards individuals or groups
- Kotobagari – Japanese term for euphemistic speech
- Linguistic relativity – Hypothesis of language influencing thought
- Logocracy – Form of government by use of words
- Newspeak – Fictional language in the novel "Nineteen Eighty-Four"
- Pensée unique – Pejorative term for ideological conformism
- People-first language – Putting the person before the diagnosis
- Politics and the English Language – 1946 essay by George Orwell
- Reverse discrimination – Discrimination against members of a dominant or majority group
- Self-censorship – Act of censoring or classifying one's own discourse
- Social justice warrior – Pejorative term for a socially progressive person
- Speech code – Non-statutory restriction on word choice
- Sprachregelung – German term for prescribed form of official communication
- Woke – Political slang
