= Pandemic (South Park) =

- South Park episode
- Episode no.: Season 12; Episode 10
- Directed by: Trey Parker
- Written by: Trey Parker
- Production code: 1210
- Original air date: October 22, 2008

Episode chronology
← Previous "Breast Cancer Show Ever"	Next → "Pandemic 2: The Startling"
- South Park season 12

"Pandemic" is the tenth episode in the twelfth season of the American animated television series South Park. The 177th episode of the series overall, it originally aired on Comedy Central in the United States on October 22, 2008.

It is the first of a two-part episode. In the episode, the boys try to capitalize on a sudden rise in Peruvian flute bands, unwittingly becoming players in a demonic being's plan to employ giant guinea pigs to attack the public. The storyline of this episode concludes in the next episode, "Pandemic 2: The Startling".

The episode was written by series co-creator Trey Parker and is rated TV-MA L in the United States. The episode features cultural references to the 2008 film Cloverfield and received mixed reviews from critics.

== Plot ==
Seeing all the Peruvian pan flute bands that have become popular recently, and the money they can make daily by selling CDs, Stan convinces Kyle, Cartman, and Kenny to start their own pan flute band. They convince their classmate Craig to invest his $100 birthday money as venture capital. The plan backfires when the head of U.S. Department of Homeland Security Michael Chertoff cracks down on all Peruvian flute bands, rounding them up and imprisoning them in Miami, with the boys also arrested in the process. While imprisoned, Craig continually criticises Stan, Kyle, Cartman, and Kenny, saying that the four main protagonists' constant schemes and their subsequent failures are the main reason for their unpopularity. The boys attempt to convince their captors that they are U.S. citizens, but Michael Chertoff and his chief aide Davis only agrees to release the boys if they agree to go on a mission to overthrow the country of Peru, in order to stop the pandemic of Peruvian flute bands at its source. As the boys prepare for their mission, Peruvian musicians still interned in the camp warn guards that their captivity will unleash the "Furry Death".

Meanwhile, Stan's father, Randy Marsh, rouses the ire of his family by videotaping every mundane household activity with his new camcorder (parodying the filming style of Cloverfield as well as the movie itself). As he records even more useless footage, there is a strange noise outside, and when he goes outside, we see the city is under attack by unknown beasts (later revealed to be large guinea pigs). As Randy runs from the attackers, he falls. Davis briefs Chertoff on the problem, only for Chertoff to reveal himself as some sort of monster and reveals that unleashing the guinea pigs was his plan all along and Craig is the only person who can stop them, before murdering Davis.

== Cultural references ==
The monsters and shaky camera style of cinematography are a reference to the 2008 film Cloverfield.

The detention center in Miami used to hold the band members is a reference to that used after the Mariel boat lift and which was featured prominently in the 1983 film Scarface.

Guinea pigs shown in the episode are an important cultural symbol of Peru and other Andean cultures.

The boys express reluctance to go to Peru because a friend had been "raped" there, in reference to the film Indiana Jones and the Kingdom of the Crystal Skull which was parodied two episodes earlier in "The China Probrem".

== Reception ==
The episode received mixed reviews. IGN rated the episode a 6.2/10, stating "the show falls back on its old gimmicks of a national crisis with fast-paced scenes of men talking importantly about stupid things. The show is good at this stuff, but we've seen it all before and it seems out of place and meaningless here. It's a long walk for a joke that's only somewhat amusing."

== Home media ==
"Pandemic", along with the thirteen other episodes from South Park's twelfth season, were released on a three-disc DVD set and two-disc Blu-ray set in the United States on March 10, 2009. The sets included brief audio commentaries by Parker and Stone for each episode, a collection of deleted scenes, and two special mini-features, The Making of 'Major Boobage and Six Days to South Park.
