= Eek, a Penis! =

- South Park episode
- Episode no.: Season 12; Episode 5
- Directed by: Trey Parker
- Written by: Trey Parker
- Production code: 1205
- Original air date: April 9, 2008

Episode chronology
← Previous "Canada on Strike"	Next → "Over Logging"
- South Park season 12

"Eek, a Penis!" is the fifth episode in the twelfth season of the American animated sitcom South Park. The 172nd episode of the series overall, it originally aired on Comedy Central in the United States on April 9, 2008. In the episode, Mrs. Garrison seeks to become a man again through the help of a new medical procedure. The subplot focuses on Cartman's attempt to teach struggling inner-city school children how to succeed by cheating. This plot is a parody of movies like 1988's Stand and Deliver, 1995's Dangerous Minds, and 1996's To Sir, with Love II with Eric Cartman playing a role similar to the teachers from those movies. The episode was rated TV-MA L for strong language in the United States.

The episode was written and directed by series co-creator Trey Parker and co-written by series co-creator Matt Stone.

== Plot summary ==
The episode begins with Mr. Garrison crying in front of his class as he recounts the story of a pregnant transsexual who appeared on The Oprah Winfrey Show a week before the episode's release. He claims that having a baby makes him a woman and that Mr. Garrison himself is still a man deep down inside. He then explains that he is no longer happy as a woman, but is unable to return to being a man because his penis was destroyed after his sex-change operation in a past episode. After launching into a rage, Garrison is removed from teaching by Principal Victoria until he gets his personal life in order, and Cartman is appointed as a temporary teacher in Garrison's place. The kids in class then steal the answer sheet for the next day's test from Garrison's desk and, as a result, pass with high scores. Impressed by the high scores, the Denver County school board asks Cartman to teach a struggling inner-city classroom at Jim Davis High School.

Mr. Garrison sees a news report describing how scientists can use a mouse to grow a human ear, and decides to have the same experiment performed on him to get a new penis, but when he opens its cage to look at it, it escapes from the lab and begins to race all over town, causing stereotypical hysterical reactions in all the women who see it, hence the title.

Meanwhile, Cartman, taking Kyle's warning about the dangers of inner-city students who will "fucking murder him", disguises himself as a middle-aged Hispanic man named "Mr. Cartmenez", and teaches his students how white people can succeed even when they cannot: by cheating, citing New England Patriots head coach Bill Belichick's success after cheating in the Spygate football scandal. Cartman often wonders aloud "How do I reach these kids?" When the kids do amazingly well, they are then challenged to take the hardest, most secure standardized test in the state. When the kids begin to doubt Cartman's methods, he again points to Belichick, implying that after he decided to win a game "for real", he ended up losing (to the New York Giants in Super Bowl XLII). The kids are encouraged by this, and all receive perfect scores (by cheating).

While Mr. Garrison is moping in the park, the mouse with his penis shows up and allows itself to be caught, and Mr. Garrison undergoes an operation to become Mr. Garrison again. He arrives back at school and explains that he now realizes that the true judge of gender is whether someone can get pregnant. The episode concludes when one teacher objects that his wife cannot have babies because of ovarian cancer, and Mr. Garrison responds with, "Well then get an AIDS test, Thomson, 'cause your wife's a dude, faggot!... Yeah! I'm back!" while jumping in the air as the mouse (who grew the penis) lets out a squeak.

== Cultural references ==
A large part of the plot parodies the film Stand and Deliver (Garfield High School / Jim Davis High School)--and Dangerous Minds—with Cartman assuming a similar role that of Jaime Escalante, although where in the film, the students are falsely accused of cheating, in the episode, the students actually do cheat, at Cartman's encouragement, and get away with it.

A scene where Mrs. Garrison's penis and a mouse sing a duet references the 1986 film An American Tail, with the song performed similar to "Somewhere Out There". Reference is also made to Bill Belichick, coach of the New England Patriots, the Spygate scandal of 2007, and Super Bowl XLII.

The episode name is a reference to dancehall singer Eek-A-Mouse, a close friend of South Park co-creator Trey Parker.

The focus on cheating in the episode started as a reference to the 2007 New England Patriots videotaping controversy with the creators expecting the Patriots to win Super Bowl XLII. The episode had to be changed when the Giants actually beat the Patriots.

== Reception ==
The AV Club's Sean O'Neal gave the episode a C rating, feeling that the parody of Stand and Deliver took away from the episode's message, "Even as someone who appreciated the reference I found it distracting, particularly since Cartman's lesson plan—teaching his students to cheat 'the white people way'—worked well enough on its own, making the allusion sort of superfluous". O'Neal felt that the references to the film were dated: "Would anyone under, say, the age of 25 get that Cartman gave himself a Jaime Escalante makeover, right down to the cardigan vests and the way he tucked his hand in his waistband?" and the Belichick appearance "fell flat".

TV Squad's Brad Trechak felt that "episodes have felt lower in quality this season" but the episode succeeded in being "unconventionally funny" and singled out the mouse/penis duet for praise.

Travis Fickett of IGN gave the episode a rating of 7.7, stating that the episode "will probably not end up as one of the more memorable episodes in the canon, but it's pretty damn fun nonetheless". Fickett also singled out the mouse/penis duet as "It is just about to get old when the penis-mouse stops by the light of the moon to sing the An American Tail inspired ballad about being lost".

== Home media ==
"Eek, a Penis!", along with the thirteen other episodes from South Park's twelfth season, were released on a three-disc DVD and Blu-ray set in the United States on March 10, 2009. The sets included brief audio commentaries by Parker and Stone for each episode, a collection of deleted scenes, and two special mini-features, The Making of Major Boobage and Six Days to South Park. Eek, a Penis was also released as part of The Cult of Cartman, a 2008 DVD compilation of Cartman-centric episodes.

== See also ==
- Mr. Garrison's Fancy New Vagina
