= Pandemic 2: The Startling =

- South Park episode
- Episode no.: Season 12; Episode 11
- Directed by: Trey Parker
- Written by: Trey Parker
- Production code: 1211
- Original air date: October 29, 2008

Episode chronology
← Previous "Pandemic"	Next → "About Last Night..."
- South Park season 12

"Pandemic 2: The Startling" is the eleventh episode in the twelfth season of the American animated television series South Park. The 178th episode of the series overall, it originally aired on Comedy Central in the United States on October 29, 2008.

It is the conclusion to the previous episode, "Pandemic". In the episode, the boys are lost in the Andes where they discover the startling secret behind the attack of the giant guinea pigs. The boys now have the power to rescue their town and the rest of the world from the onslaught, but Michael Chertoff, the Head of Homeland Security, stands firmly in their way. Meanwhile, Randy bravely documents the destruction while trying to save his family.

The episode was written by series co-creator Trey Parker and is rated TV-MA L in the United States.

== Plot ==
The episode opens with Craig Tucker recounting the events of the previous episode in his journal. Stranded in the Andes Mountains with Stan, Kyle, Cartman, Kenny, and two pilots, the boys discover a jungle filled with giant fruit. After the pilots are killed by guinea bee larvae, the boys flee into an ancient temple, where carvings reveal that Peruvian flute bands have historically kept the giant guinea pigs contained. The final carving depicts Craig, who refuses to investigate further and attempts to leave.

Meanwhile in South Park, Randy obsessively films the destruction caused by giant guinea pigs and their various mutations, which include guinea bears and guinea-saurus rexes. His intentionally erratic camerawork and heavy breathing increasingly irritate Sharon and the other survivors.

At Machu Picchu, United States Secretary of Homeland Security Michael Chertoff encounters the boys and orders their execution, believing them to be Peruvian flute musicians. When Stan confronts him about the invasion, Chertoff reveals his plan for world domination. After being shot by one of his guards, he transforms into a giant guinea pirate. Craig attempts to leave but inadvertently steps on a stone tile, fulfilling the temple’s prophecy and releasing magical energy from his eyes that paralyzes Chertoff.

In a closing journal entry, Craig explains that the government released the Peruvian flute bands, allowing them to drive the guinea pigs back into the jungle. He concludes that certain events are beyond anyone’s control and vows never to trust anyone asking him for money again. The boys subsequently visit his house dressed as a mariachi band, prompting him to shut the door.

Meanwhile, Randy discovers that he had forgotten to insert a tape into his camera, rendering his recordings useless. In Washington, D.C., the imprisoned guinea pirate escapes and begins attacking the city.

== Production ==
The monsters and shaky camera style of cinematography are a reference to the 2008 American monster movie Cloverfield. The subplot, in which the giant guinea pigs attack a small town is a parody of Night of the Lepus. The guinea pig costumes were purchased online. According to the creator commentary, the guinea pigs used in filming refused to move when put into the costumes and it took hours of filming to get one usable shot for the episode.

The Guinny Valley where the guinea pig monsters originate from is a parody of Land of the Giants and Land of the Lost (referenced to in the episode as "Land of the Giants Lost World").

== Reception ==
The episode received mixed reviews. The A.V. Club graded the episode a C−, stating "That was too damn long to tell a story with so little substance and so few real laughs. Kinda like Cloverfield. Maybe that was the point".

== Home release ==
"Pandemic 2: The Startling", along with the thirteen other episodes from South Park's twelfth season, were released on a three-disc DVD set and two-disc Blu-ray set in the United States on March 10, 2009. The sets included brief audio commentaries by Parker and Stone for each episode, a collection of deleted scenes, and two special mini-features, The Making of 'Major Boobage and 6 Days to Air.
