= Over Logging =

- South Park episode
- Episode no.: Season 12; Episode 6
- Directed by: Trey Parker
- Written by: Trey Parker
- Production code: 1206
- Original air date: April 16, 2008

Guest appearance
- Amir Hisham Ouazzani as Amir

Episode chronology
← Previous "Eek, a Penis!"	Next → "Super Fun Time"
- South Park season 12

"Over Logging" is the sixth episode in the twelfth season of the American animated series South Park. The 173rd episode of the series overall, it originally aired on Comedy Central in the United States on April 16, 2008. In the episode, internet access cuts out in Colorado, which leads to a social crisis, making the Marsh family join a mass-migration west to a camp with scarce Internet access. The episode was rated TV-MA-LS for strong language and sexual content in the United States.

The episode was written and directed by series co-creator Trey Parker. The episode parodies John Steinbeck's 1939 novel The Grapes of Wrath and its subsequent film adaptation.

== Plot ==
The Marsh family are performing various online activities one evening when Sharon sends them all to bed for the night, insisting that the Internet will still be there tomorrow. The next morning, Stan discovers that he has no Internet connection. It is soon discovered that no device in the home has Internet access, which leads to panic. After a visit to the Broflovskis and to Starbucks, it becomes apparent that the entire town's internet connection is down. The streets fill with a panicked horde. The TV news, which has nothing to report without the Internet, reports vague rumors of Internet access in Silicon Valley.

After eight days without Internet, the Marsh family decides to "head out Californee way". Various people they pass also mention their lack of Internet. At an overnight stay at a camp, a man tells a tale of his two children starving due to waiting three days for a web page to load, with the loading progress bar having reached around half.

When the Marshes reach California, they are placed in a Red Cross "Internet refugee camp," where only one computer is available to serve the visitors, and each family is allowed only 40 seconds of access per day. Users whose time is expired are dragged away from the computer desk by camp staff. Camp staff shut down Internet access until the next day and lock the computer away in a shipping container shed for the night, disappointing those who did not get to use it.

Randy sneaks into the shed at night to use the computer secretly. He looks up bizarre sexual fetishes such as "Japanese girls puking in each other's mouths", bestiality, and "Brazilian fart porn". As he masturbates watching the videos, his moans attract attention, and he is discovered covered head-to-toe in semen. He shifts the blame to a "spooky ghost" who allegedly slimed him with ectoplasm. A guard angrily discovers that Randy has used up the little amount of connection time they had left.

Meanwhile, the government has attempted to find a way to fix "the Internet", a large machine resembling a giant Linksys wireless router, which has stopped functioning for an unknown reason. Several attempts are made to repair it: negotiating with it, communicating with it musically, and even shooting at it. Acting on a hunch, Kyle disconnects and reconnects its power cord. The network indicator now glows green and the bars of the connection strength indicator gradually light up again, much to everyone's joy, and Shelley finally gets to meet her boyfriend Amir (played by Amir Hisham Ouazzani).

After the Internet is restored, Randy delivers a speech advising against taking access for granted, wearing a Native American-esque outfit, warning about the overuse of "natural resources" (a parody of the long monologue speech that Steven Seagal gives about the environment at the end of On Deadly Ground). Randy says that people should learn from the experience and stop "over-logging on" because they may be unprepared if the Internet is lost permanently as a result. He advises people to stop browsing pointlessly, to only use it when truly necessary, and to only view porn "twice a day... max."

== Cultural references ==
While most of the episode is a parody of The Grapes of Wrath, other works referenced include a parody of Steven Seagal's speech from the ending of On Deadly Ground, Dominique Dunne's delivery of the line "What is happening?!" from the movie Poltergeist, and the five-note musical motif used to communicate with aliens in Close Encounters of the Third Kind.

== Reception ==
"Over Logging" received average reviews. Travis Fickett of IGN said that "Ultimately 'Over Logging' attempts to be a satire on our over reliance on and addiction to the Internet. However, it only raises the topic without actually having much to say or jokes to tell" and that "it's all build up with not much pay-off. That's the way much of the episode functions – as if there's a big joke on the way that never really arrives. There's a Close Encounters reference, and the revelation that "The Internet" is just a giant router. Kyle figures out that all you have to do is unplug it and plug it back in – the catch-all solution". Fickett gave the episode 7 out of 10.

Josh Modell of The A.V. Club gave the episode a "C" grade and noted that "There was one big message – we're overly reliant on the Internet, and we mostly use it for time-wasting bullshit – which was beaten until it wasn't all that funny anymore."

Brad Trechak of HuffPost TV said of the plot "As someone who works with the Internet for his day job, I had some problems with the simplistic way that it was presented. The Internet is used for much more than shopping or e-mailing (or, indeed, porn). Entire industries rely on it. The only part that struck me as truthful was seeing people live in a Great Depression-type state without the Internet."

== Home media ==
"Over Logging", along with the thirteen other episodes from South Park's twelfth season, were released on a three-disc DVD set and two-disc Blu-ray set in the United States on March 10, 2009. The sets included brief audio commentaries by Parker and Stone for each episode, a collection of deleted scenes, and two special mini-features, The Making of 'Major Boobage and Six Days to South Park.
