= Lenin: The Day After the Revolution =

2017 book of writings of Vladimir Lenin

The Day After the Revolution
- First edition (with original title)
- Author: Slavoj Žižek
- Original title: Lenin 2017: Remembering, Repeating, and Working Through
- Language: English
- Series: Revolutions
- Subject: Vladimir Lenin, Marxism, Leninism, Revolutionary politics
- Genre: Nonfiction
- Publisher: Verso Books
- Publication date: 2017
- Publication place: United Kingdom
- Media type: Print
- ISBN: 9781786636300

The Day After the Revolution is a 2017 nonfiction book of writings by Vladimir Lenin from after the Soviet victory during the Russian Civil War up to his death in 1924. The book was published Verso Books and edited by Slavoj Žižek, who also provides an extensive introduction. Žižek describes this body of writings as significant to understanding the philosophical potential of Lenin's revolutionary ideology and its significance to contemporary leftism.

== Remembering, Repeating and Working Through ==
In his introduction, Žižek analogizes the dialectical conflicts of Marxism with the Freudian conception of "working through" repressions to therapeutically benefit individuals psychologically. To Žižek, the failures of leftism in the 20th century, constituted by the failure of the USSR, constitutes a collective trauma to the political left that must be overcome through the titular "Remembering, Repeating, and Working Through".

== Reception ==
Writing in American conservative magazine National Review, Brian C. Anderson accused Žižek of hypocrisy for benefiting from the same Western liberal culture that Anderson saw Lenin as antithesizing.

== See also ==
- Working through – Psychodynamic psychotherapy technique
- Transference – Phenomenon within psychotherapy
