= Breast Cancer Show Ever =

- South Park episode
- Episode no.: Season 12; Episode 9
- Directed by: Trey Parker
- Written by: Trey Parker
- Production code: 1209
- Original air date: October 15, 2008

Episode chronology
← Previous "The China Probrem"	Next → "Pandemic"
- South Park season 12

"Breast Cancer Show Ever" is the ninth episode in the twelfth season of the American animated television series South Park, and the 176th episode of the series overall. It originally aired on Comedy Central in the United States on October 15, 2008. The episode was written and directed by series co-creator Trey Parker. In the episode, Eric Cartman's disrespectful behavior puts him on the wrong side of Wendy Testaburger when he mocks her presentation on breast cancer awareness, which leads to Wendy threatening to beat him up after school. The episode was rated TV-MA L in the United States.

== Plot ==
During Wendy Testaburger's presentation on breast cancer awareness, Eric Cartman ridicules the disease while their teacher Mr. Garrison does little to stop him. After class, as Wendy is putting up posters to raise breast cancer awareness, Cartman continues to mock the disease, prompting an infuriated Wendy to challenge him to a fistfight after school. As word of the fight quickly spreads through the school, Cartman becomes frightened and reluctant to go through with the fight, afraid of losing to a girl in front of his friends. He tries to call off the fight with quiet apologies and bribery, but Wendy is not convinced of his sincerity.

Cartman tries to convince Stan Marsh to talk Wendy out of it, but Stan does not believe he can do anything to stop her. Finally, Cartman pulls Wendy aside and tells her that his mother has been diagnosed with breast cancer, though she does not believe him. Desperate to avoid the fight, Cartman humiliates himself by eating his underwear in front of Wendy (without her changing her mind) and later defecates onto Mr. Garrison's desk in order to get detention. Butters Stotch, Craig Tucker, and Jimmy Valmer tell Cartman there are rumors that he deliberately got detention to avoid the fight, though Cartman refutes this. Relieved, Craig reveals that they rescheduled the fight for the following morning before school.

Later, Cartman plays the victim by having his mother convince Wendy's parents that he is being bullied by Wendy at school. Wendy's parents forbid her from fighting and she reluctantly acquiesces. Cartman then taunts Wendy further by making faces at her and giving her the middle finger, unseen by the adults, further enraging Wendy. Due to the severe warnings from her parents, Wendy does not show up for the fight the following morning, arriving only in time to begin school. Cartman takes the opportunity to call her names like "chicken", convincing the others that she is a coward.

In class, Cartman taunts Wendy even further by giving a presentation about breast cancer. Wendy, losing her temper, begins to attack Cartman but is called to Principal Victoria's office. Wendy believes that she's in trouble, but when she arrives, Principal Victoria congratulates her on raising awareness for breast cancer and then tells her that she has heard that Wendy is planning to fight Cartman for making fun of it. However, Wendy informs her that there will not be a fight. Surprised, Victoria then reveals to Wendy that she is a breast cancer survivor and that she personally learned that cancer is "pure evil" and cannot be reasoned with, and that one must risk everything fighting the "fat little lump" before it takes everything. Wendy quickly catches on, realizing that the principal is not talking about cancer, but telling her that she has to fight Cartman, regardless of the consequences.

Wendy then meets Cartman on the playground for the fight, telling him that she doesn't care if she gets in trouble for fighting him. Cartman makes a final effort to escape the situation by claiming that it is too late in their recess period to go through, but he eventually decides to fight. Although Cartman briefly gains the upper hand, Wendy dominates the fight and soon emerges victorious with only a few bruises, while leaving Cartman bruised, bloody, and having knocked out many of his teeth. The other students cheer her for her victory, and after Wendy leaves and a few students disperse, Cartman begins to sob in front of the remaining students: bemoaning that he will no longer be considered "the cool kid". Cartman's classmates assure him that they never thought he was cool in the first place and that they all have always disliked him; Cartman in delusion assumes they're trying to make him feel better, reasoning that they must still like him. Cartman is suddenly elated at this thought, leaving the others shocked, bewildered and dumbfounded.

== Cultural references ==
The plot of the episode is loosely based on the film Three O'Clock High. The fight scene is also based on that of the film Snatch and references the ending scene of There Will Be Blood. In the DVD commentary, Parker and Matt Stone refer to the character's interactions in the episode as thematically similar to the cartoon show Peanuts and "kids being kids". While Cartman awaits the fight in class, Mr. Garrison says, "So you see, at this point Euripides knew he could not win the battle", referencing The Frogs, a comedic play by Aristophanes where the Greek tragedians Euripides and Aeschylus are measured against one another, the better to be revived so he can "educate the thoughtless" and rid Athens of evil politicians that are ruining the city (1500–1502, The Frogs).

== Reception ==
The A.V. Club graded the episode a B+, stating "All in all, not the most-ambitious episode, but that actually worked in its favor: Outside of Wendy's crib from There Will Be Blood at the end, it could have been broadcast 10 years ago and worked, and I also have a feeling it will still be funny 10 years from now since it wasn't crammed with instantly-dated references". IGN gave the episode an 8.2/10 rating, stating "While this is a fun sequence, and a nice bit of observation, the episode does seem somewhat anticlimactic. It's amusing that Cartman thinks he somehow achieved something when he finds out the kids always thought he sucked and their opinion of him 'couldn't possibly be any lower'. Massive self-delusion is part of Cartman's 'charm'. But the episode is unusually focused for South Park and once the fight is over there's a sense (perhaps intentionally?) of 'that's it?'. It's not one of the best episodes ever, but it's a solid old-school installment that offers up some truly great moments – many of them quintessential Cartman. Which is always fun to watch".

== Home release ==
"Breast Cancer Show Ever", along with the thirteen other episodes from South Park's twelfth season, were released on a three-disc DVD set and two-disc Blu-ray set in the United States on March 10, 2009. The sets included brief audio commentaries by Parker and Stone for each episode, a collection of deleted scenes, and two special mini-features, The Making of 'Major Boobage and Six Days to South Park.
