= South Park season 12 =

Season of television series

South Park
- Season 12
- Home media release cover
- No. of episodes: 14

Release
- Original network: Comedy Central
- Original release: March 12 – November 19, 2008

Season chronology
- ← Previous; Season 11 Next → Season 13

The twelfth season of South Park, an American animated television series created by Trey Parker and Matt Stone, began airing on March 12, 2008. The twelfth season concluded after 14 episodes on November 19, 2008. Saturday Night Live cast member Bill Hader is credited as a consultant starting with this season. Parker was the director and writer in this twelfth season. Stone was also the writer on the third episode of the twelfth season.

== Overview ==
This season features a new title sequence, replacing the one used since the sixth season. It recreates the original to begin with before using clips from seasons four to eleven which the boys also sing their lines over. These older clips are replaced every half season with newer ones.

In the first half of the season, Mr. Kitty returns to prominence in "Major Boobage" for the first time since season three's "Cat Orgy", while Terrance and Phillip haven't featured prominently since season five's "Terrance and Phillip: Behind the Blow". Canada last featured prominently as a setting in season seven's "It's Christmas in Canada". Most notably in this season is Ms. Garrison's second sex change, returning her to being a man, as Mr. Garrison again: "Eek, A Penis!" is the last episode to date to explore Garrison's much examined sexuality. "Super Fun Time" indicates that following "The List", Stan and Wendy Testaburger are dating again as well as Wendy and Bebe are being friends again.

The second half of the season begins with "The China Probrem", which marks the return of Steven Spielberg and George Lucas who are again portrayed as villains, despite seemingly dying in season six's "Free Hat". There is also the one two-part story: "Pandemic" and "Pandemic 2: The Startling". The following episode "About Last Night" parodies Barack Obama's victory in the 2008 presidential elections the night before. The episode was written and animated under the assumption Obama would win which turned out to be correct. Parker and Stone said they had considered intentionally redubbing the episode poorly if John McCain had won. This episode also revealed the political alliances of several citizens. "The Ungroundable" marks the return of the Goth Kids who last featured in season nine's "Erection Day".

Kenny McCormick does not die in this season.

== Awards ==
The season received one Emmy Award and, in May 2009, a Webby Award.

== Reception ==
=== Critical response ===
The twelfth season of South Park has been met with mostly positive reviews from critics and fans. Travis Fikett of IGN gave the season 7.5/10, saying that it was "good" and "Season 12 isn't bad, it's just not that great. There are a number of misfires and no truly classic episodes. That's a rarity for a series that often has fans calling up friends the next morning to say "Oh my God, did you see South Park?".

== Episodes ==
No. overall	No. in season	Title	Directed by	Written by	Original release date	Prod. code	U.S. viewers (millions)
168	1	"Tonsil Trouble"	Trey Parker	Trey Parker	March 12, 2008	1201	3.07
After having his tonsils removed Cartman contracts HIV, but when he finds out that people no longer care about AIDS he looks for a cure. Kyle finds it funny that Cartman has AIDS and so Cartman finds a way to give Kyle AIDS to settle the score between them.
169	2	"Britney's New Look"	Trey Parker	Trey Parker	March 19, 2008	1202	2.97
The boys try to get a photo of pop singing trainwreck Britney Spears to cash in on the news reporting her latest social faux pas, but when Britney survives a suicide attempt that leaves her with most of her head missing, the boys soon discover the real reason behind Britney's downfall and try to save her from further exploitation.
170	3	"Major Boobage"	Trey Parker	Trey Parker	March 26, 2008	1203	3.60
In this homage to the 1981 film Heavy Metal, the boys worry when Kenny becomes addicted to sniffing cat urine in order to get high. Meanwhile, Cartman takes in all of South Park's cats and Kyle's dad relapses into being addicted to sniffing cat urine.
171	4	"Canada on Strike"	Trey Parker	Trey Parker	April 2, 2008	1204	2.80
The head of the World Canadian Bureau (nicknamed the "WGA") leads the country into a strike over residual money made by the Internet. Meanwhile, the South Park boys try to turn Butters into the latest viral video star, in order to make money to give to Canada.
172	5	"Eek, a Penis!"	Trey Parker	Trey Parker	April 9, 2008	1205	3.50
While Mrs. Garrison goes on sabbatical to reverse her sex change and become Mr. Garrison again, Cartman becomes a strict teacher whose unorthodox methods are needed in an inner city school.
173	6	"Over Logging"	Trey Parker	Trey Parker	April 16, 2008	1206	3.13
In this homage to John Steinbeck's The Grapes of Wrath, the Marsh family heads west after the Internet connection goes down nationwide.
174	7	"Super Fun Time"	Trey Parker	Trey Parker	April 23, 2008	1207	3.08
While the kids are on an educational field trip to a living museum, Cartman forces Butters to sneak away from the class to go to the amusement center, located next door. And during while they both are away and separated from class, museum's cast and rest of class are suddenly held hostage by a group of thieves and burglars. Therefore, cast of museum and class must face this onslaught and wrath of armed robbery.
175	8	"The China Probrem"	Trey Parker	Trey Parker	October 8, 2008	1208	3.73
Cartman and Butters invade a P.F. Chang's after Cartman thinks the Chinese will overtake America. Meanwhile, Stan, Kyle, and Kenny are traumatized after seeing the latest Indiana Jones movie. Note: This episode was dedicated to Isaac Hayes, who voiced Chef and died on August 10, 2008, two months before the episode aired.
176	9	"Breast Cancer Show Ever"	Trey Parker	Trey Parker	October 15, 2008	1209	2.85
Wendy is fed up with Cartman's jokes when he makes fun of her report on breast cancer, and challenges him to a fight.
177	10	"Pandemic"	Trey Parker	Trey Parker	October 22, 2008	1210	2.78
In the first half of a two-part special, world faces a wave of Peruvian pan flute bands. The boys ask for Craig's financial support to form a pan flute band of their own, while the government tries to decide how to handle the "pandemic".
178	11	"Pandemic 2: The Startling"	Trey Parker	Trey Parker	October 29, 2008	1211	3.08
Part 2 of 2. The boys are lost in the Andes Mountains where they discover the startling secret behind the attack of the giant guinea pigs. Meanwhile, Randy bravely documents the destruction while trying to save his family.
179	12	"About Last Night..."	Trey Parker	Trey Parker	November 5, 2008	1212	3.60
Following the 2008 US presidential election, Barack Obama catches everyone off guard when he arrives at the White House prematurely. Meanwhile, the Barack Obama supporters of South Park celebrate Obama's victory while the John McCain supporters fear the end of the world and take shelter.
180	13	"Elementary School Musical"	Trey Parker	Trey Parker	November 12, 2008	1213	2.96
The boys realize they are the only kids at school who are not hit by the new High School Musical fad, making everyone in school break out in song.
181	14	"The Ungroundable"	Trey Parker	Trey Parker	November 19, 2008	1214	3.29
A vampire fad is spreading at South Park Elementary, thanks to the movie Twilight. Butters believes that the students interested in this culture are actual vampires and becomes tempted to join them. Meanwhile, the Goth kids are finding their style is becoming mistaken with the new fad and set out to stop it.

== Home media ==
South Park: The Complete Twelfth Season was released as a three-disc Region 1 DVD box set in the USA on March 10, 2009, nearly one year after it had begun broadcast on television.

South Park – The Complete Twelfth Season
Set Details	Special Features
14 Episodes; 3-Disc Set; 1.33:1 Aspect Ratio; Subtitles: English; English (Dolby Digital 5.1 Surround)	Mini-commentaries on every episode; 6 Days to South Park: Day-by-day "making of" of "South Park"; Making Boobage: Behind the Scenes of "Major Boobage"; Behind the Scenes of "…About Last Night"
Release Dates
United States	United Kingdom
March 10, 2009	24 May 2009

== See also ==
- South Park (Park County, Colorado)
- South Park City
