= The Ungroundable =

- South Park episode
- Episode no.: Season 12; Episode 14
- Directed by: Trey Parker
- Written by: Trey Parker
- Production code: 1214
- Original air date: November 19, 2008

Episode chronology
← Previous "Elementary School Musical"	Next → "The Ring"
- South Park season 12

"The Ungroundable" is the fourteenth and final episode of the twelfth season of the American animated series South Park, and the 181st episode of the series overall. It originally aired on Comedy Central in the United States on November 19, 2008. This is the last episode of South Park to be broadcast in 480i standard definition. The episode was rated TV-MA L in the United States. The episode spoofs vampire films including the Twilight craze and The Lost Boys, where Butters believes that he sees vampires in the school. The episode was written and directed by series co-creator Trey Parker.

== Plot ==
While the students are playing Call of Duty: World at War in a computer lab at school, Butters Stotch frantically runs in and says he's seen vampires, mistaking older students following the vampire craze for actual vampires and tries to raise the alarm. Eric Cartman suggests that he go "document the vampires" simply to get rid of him.

Taking Cartman's words literally, Butters sneaks into the school gym and hides to record the members of the South Park Vampires' Club on his dictaphone. One of the vampires talks about vampire-related customs and they "feed" by drinking clamato juice. However, Butters' dictaphone malfunctions, exposing him in front of the vampires. Butters attempts to repel them with a crucifix before running away.

Butters goes home, only to have his father, Stephen yell at him due to the fact that the food pantry is not organized and because of this, he mistakenly put Hamburger Helper in his glass of milk. Stephen, without listening to anything Butters is saying, argues that "the only thing that keeps a family together is an organized pantry" and angrily threatens to ground Butters.

After being threatened to be grounded by his parents, Butters thinks aloud, concluding that nobody listens to him. Having come to believe that if he becomes a vampire he will no longer get victimized, he asks the vampire kids to let him join them. They take him to Hot Topic and change his appearance to match theirs. Butters returns home to his parents, who are angry at him because of his lateness and his dyed hair. Butters responds that he is now "ungroundable" and hisses at his parents, thus completely shocking them.

Shortly after, Butters starts wasting away because he believes he is a real vampire and can only feed on blood. He sneaks into Cartman's room in the middle of the night in a failed attempt to "feed," only managing to give Cartman a hickey. Butters' parents, alerted by Cartman's mother, ask him if he "got gay with one of his schoolmates [that] night". Stephen attempts to confine Butters to his bedroom, but he simply leaps out of the window.

Throughout this episode, the school's Goth kids loathe the vampire kids with whom they keep getting confused by everyone, including Principal Victoria. Reluctantly, they decide to switch to a casual look to clear the confusion, but change their mind when they hear someone from the school soccer team describing them as "that fat girl, the big nose kid, the midget and the kid with pock marks on his face", which had caused them to become Goths in the first place. After discussing what they could do to stop the vampire craze, the Goth kids decide to get rid of "the head vampire", fifth grade student Mike Makowski, whom they kidnap and mail to Scottsdale, which they consider "the most horrible, most miserable place on Earth". This, however, fails to solve the problem, and just when the Goth kids are about to face defeat from the vampire kids, Butters informs them that Hot Topic is the source of the vampire craze. He takes them there and they burn down the store.

At home, Butters tells his parents that the Goth kids burnt down the Hot Topic and thus has now "reverted" back to human and he becomes "groundable" once more, much to his parents' relief. In the end, the Goth kids ask for a school assembly in order to explain to everyone the differences between Goth kids and "douchebag vampire wanna-be boner" kids, exclaiming, "Because anyone who thinks they are actually a vampire is freaking retarded." They receive a standing ovation, with the eldest Goth kid closing their speech with, "Fuck all of you" and flipping everyone off, to even more applause.

== Production ==
The initial idea for "The Ungroundable" was created the week before production, when the team at South Park Studios was working on "Elementary School Musical". In that episode, Parker had planned to have the school children simply move on to the next fad, which would have been the Twilight Saga film series. Twilight had opened in theaters several weeks before and was a phenomenon among tweens and teens, and Parker and Stone realized parodying it would be stronger material for a full episode, rather than a throwaway joke. In addition, they found that a reaction from the Goth kids to everyone suddenly dressing their style would be a "big emotional thing" for the characters, and decided to save it.

"The Ungroundable" was the last of a series of seven episodes produced in the latter half of 2008, during a run that Parker described as "tough." Like many South Park episodes, much of the storyline was crafted one week prior during a Thursday writer's meeting. The Goth kids first appeared in the season seven episode "Raisins" (2003), and had made appearances in the ensuing years; Parker went back and watched the episode to reacquaint himself with the characters. He noted that while that particular episode mocked Goth kids, later portrayals, such as those in "The Ungroundable", were more sympathetic, with both Parker and Stone calling the Goth kids some of their favorite characters in the series.

Parker, in the episode's DVD commentary, related a story from not long after the episode's broadcast, in which he was approached by a "Goth" woman at a bar in Nashville following a Tennessee Titans game, who thanked him for writing an episode about the supposed differences between the subcultures.

== Reception ==
Travis Fickett of IGN gave the episode a 7.4/10 rating, saying "[w]hile there are lots of funny bits in this episode, it's far from a home run. It's clever, and well put together and makes a few good points – but it's just not as laugh out loud funny as you'd expect South Park to be. [...] Nonetheless, what often makes South Park work are the little moments, the vocal tics of the characters and so forth. I imagine "per se" will catch on, if only for a little bit, as the pseudo-intellectual affectation of vamp-douche-ese. While "The Ungroundable" isn't a home run in terms of laughs, given the current Twilight craze, the show continues to serve as a satirical chronicle of our times, which makes even a middling episode an argument for South Park's continual longevity."

== Home media ==
"The Ungroundable", along with the thirteen other episodes from South Park's twelfth season, were released on a three-disc DVD and Blu-ray set in the United States on March 10, 2009. The sets included brief audio commentaries by Parker and Stone for each episode, a collection of deleted scenes, and two special mini-features, The Making of 'Major Boobage and Six Days to South Park.

The episode was also released on the two-disc DVD collection A Little Box of Butters.
