= Super Fun Time =

- South Park episode
- Episode no.: Season 12; Episode 7
- Directed by: Trey Parker
- Written by: Trey Parker
- Production code: 1207
- Original air date: April 23, 2008

Episode chronology
← Previous "Over Logging"	Next → "The China Probrem"
- South Park season 12

"Super Fun Time" is the seventh episode in the twelfth season of the American animated television series South Park. The 174th episode of the series overall, it originally aired on Comedy Central in the United States on April 23, 2008. In the episode, Cartman and Butters narrowly escape a horrific hostage situation at South Park's Pioneer Village, where historical reenactors take their jobs far too seriously. The episode was rated TV-MA-LV for strong language and violence in the United States. This is the last South Park episode produced in 4:3, from the next episode and onward, all other episodes will be produced in 16:9.

The episode was written and directed by South Park co-creator Trey Parker. During pre-production, the episode was under a working alternative title "The Living Museum" until it was changed later on. The show's plot was largely influenced by the film Die Hard.

== Plot ==
Mr. Garrison takes his fourth grade class on a field trip to Pioneer Village, a 19th-century themed living history museum, where actors perform as if it was 1864 and never break character (much to the annoyance of the children). Since nobody wants to be partners with him, Cartman is forced as punishment to take Butters as his partner and Garrison tells Butters not to let go of Cartman's hand until they are back on the bus.

A gang of thieves who had just robbed a Burger King flee to Pioneer Village, taking everyone hostage. Stan, Wendy, Jimmy and Kyle flee with two townspeople to an office where Kyle calls the police. The thieves find a locked mine shaft door. They interrogate the workers to find the code, but none will break character (even after the thieves manage to kill one of the workers), and the one that does break character gets shot by his own employer.

Cartman and Butters escape the village and go to an arcade called "Super Phun Thyme", but Butters stubbornly refuses let go of Cartman's hand, which leads to Butters being dragged around as Cartman plays games. When they return to Pioneer Village and see the entrance surrounded by police, they believe they are there because someone has noticed they left, so they decide to sneak back in and claim they were there all along. The leader of the thieves, Franz, threatens to kill the kids (specifically Kenny), but Stan portrays a time period character and gives the workers an in-character way to divulge the door code.

Cartman and Butters jump the fence into the village, where one of the thieves promptly confronts them. The thief tries to make them put their hands on their heads, but Butters will not let go of Cartman. Butters uses Cartman as a weapon by flinging him at the robber, runs away and they are knocked out by a hand grenade. The blast makes the robbers investigate, leaving only Franz guarding the hostages. Stan points to him and gives the village criminal, Murderin' Murphy, an in-character reason to attack him. With the hostages clear, the police raid the camp and engage in a shootout with the thieves, most of whom are killed, while Franz is cornered and arrested. As the workers finally break character (since their working shift is over) and leave to enjoy some festivities, Stan is praised for being a hero and an injured Butters stumbles out of the camp, still clutching Cartman's hand. Butters drags the unconscious Cartman to the bus steps and finally lets go of his hand, proudly proclaiming that his partner is accounted for before fainting from exhaustion.

== Production ==
The idea of a pioneer museum that never breaks character started off as the idea for the Katrina episode that became "Two Days Before the Day After Tomorrow". "Super Phun Thyme" was based on Celebrity Sports Center which both Parker and Stone visited as kids.

== Reception ==
The episode received an average-to-positive response. Travis Fickett of IGN rated the episode an 8/10, stating: "A lot was in play here, and it's a well executed episode. They play on our expectation that Kenny would die, Mr. Garrison's cowardice, Cartman's troublemaking and Butters' steadfast compliance with the rules. There's a lot of fun stuff here, and it's a cool way to wrap up the 'half season' before we get new episodes in the fall". However, Josh Modell of The A.V. Club graded the episode a C+, stating: "It was okay. Not great, not horrible. Funny, but not hilarious. There was a noticeable lack of proselytizing, which can be a good or a bad thing".

== Home release ==
"Super Fun Time", along with the thirteen other episodes from South Park's twelfth season, was released on a three-disc DVD and Blu-ray set in the United States on March 10, 2009. The sets included brief audio commentaries by Parker and Stone for each episode, a collection of deleted scenes, and two special mini-features, The Making of Major Boobage and Six Days to South Park. Super Fun Time was also released as part of The Cult of Cartman, a 2008 DVD compilation of Cartman-centric episodes.
