= The China Probrem =

- South Park episode
- Episode no.: Season 12; Episode 8
- Directed by: Trey Parker
- Written by: Trey Parker
- Production code: 1208
- Original air date: October 8, 2008

Episode chronology
← Previous "Super Fun Time"	Next → "Breast Cancer Show Ever"
- South Park season 12

"The China Probrem" is the eighth episode in the twelfth season of the American animated television series South Park. The 175th episode of the series overall, it originally aired on Comedy Central in the United States on October 8, 2008. It was the mid-season premiere for season 12, and was rated TV-MA-LSV for strong language, sexual content, and violence in the United States. This is the first South Park episode produced in 16:9, even though it was originally broadcast in 4:3.

In the episode, Eric Cartman, after watching the intimidating opening ceremonies of the recent Olympic games, believes that the Chinese are just days away from invading his homeland. While the rest of the American people are haunted by the memory of a recent tragic event, only Butters will stand with Cartman as he tries to confront the Chinese. Meanwhile, Kyle Broflovski seeks to bring George Lucas and Steven Spielberg to justice for "raping" Indiana Jones in Indiana Jones and the Kingdom of the Crystal Skull. The flashbacks mimic rape scenes from Boys Don't Cry, The Accused, and Deliverance.

== Plot ==
After watching the Beijing 2008 Olympics opening ceremony on television, Eric Cartman has been plagued by nightmares about the Chinese, believing that they will invade America. He tries to warn his friends but Kyle says he "can't do this any more" and leaves. Stan later confronts Kyle, the latter stating that he cannot pretend things are normal again after "the rape of a friend". He confesses his feelings of deep guilt and regret over the fact he, Stan and their friends "just stood there and did nothing". Elsewhere, Cartman convinces Butters Stotch that China is going to take over America and kill Butters' parents Stephen and Linda. Butters decides to join Cartman's group, the American Liberation Front. Stan Marsh, Kyle Broflovski, Kenny McCormick, Clyde Donovan, and Jimmy Valmer start to remember and have flashbacks of the rape which is revealed to be their viewing of Indiana Jones and the Kingdom of the Crystal Skull. They are appalled and devastated to see George Lucas (voiced by Matt Stone) and Steven Spielberg (voiced by Trey Parker) rape Indiana Jones.

Meanwhile, Cartman and Butters dress up as stereotypical Chinese children and go to P. F. Chang's China Bistro to try to trick the Chinese people into telling them when the "invasion" is set to occur. The two boys' antics begin to annoy everyone, but when they are asked to leave, they instead take the entire restaurant hostage. Cartman gives Butters a gun and tells him to fire at a man who is trying to escape. Butters promptly shoots the man in the penis, which upsets Cartman greatly. At the same time, Kyle and his friends visit the Park County District Attorney and ask him to arrest Spielberg and Lucas for raping Indiana Jones and he tearfully agrees to help them. Afterwards, they go to the Park County Police Station to have Spielberg and Lucas arrested.

Back at the restaurant, the police arrive to respond to the hostage situation. When the police try to enter the restaurant, Butters fires a warning shot and also hits the Chinese policeman in the penis, angering Cartman all the more. Meanwhile, the police find and take away Spielberg and Lucas (while raping a Stormtrooper), despite their protests over a lack of evidence and the huge totals they have brought in at the box office. At the restaurant, Cartman gives up on his mission of saving America after Butters shoots another man in the penis and surrenders to the police. As he is walking outside, a police officer arrives to inform the others that Lucas and Spielberg are finally in custody. The officers and hostages all rejoice that "it's all over", and while everyone is hugging and crying, Cartman and Butters sneak away. Reflecting on the day's events, Cartman decides he would rather be Chinese than "a nation of unethical dick shooters". Butters is unable to see what all the fuss is about, as he thought Kingdom of the Crystal Skull was "pretty good".

== Production ==
In the DVD commentary for the episode, Trey Parker admits that he received a shot of steroids in order to complete the voice work for the episode. Matt Stone compares the rape scenes to an earlier season 12 episode, "Britney's New Look", for being darker than it is funny. For the creators, the scariest part of the new Indiana Jones film is that it suggests the possibility that the quality of South Park will also eventually decline.

== Reception ==
The episode premiere drew 3.7 million total viewers, 2.5 million in the 18–49 demographic. This was up 21% from the previous fall's debut and topped all of cable during its time period. It stands as the show's most-watched fall premiere since 1999. IGN writer Travis Fickett gave the episode a 9 out of 10, praising both storylines and writing that "[t]he show is as funny and as smart as ever — and it's back at just the right time." 411mania's review, written by DC Perry, criticized the episode for using material that felt dated, but described it as "pretty solid" and gave it a rating of 7.3 out of 10.

The episode's rape scenes caused some controversies. The Daily Telegraph's Catherine Elsworth wrote that Parker and Stone seemed "to have taken the taboo-busting to a place even hardened South Park watchers have found hard to go". Nikki Finke reported that her knowledge was that Paramount Pictures, which distributed the Lucasfilm-owned Indiana Jones franchise (while Paramount itself was owned by Comedy Central's then-parent Viacom), had no intention to protest against the episode, but, in the words of an insider, "[wanted] it to go away".

== Home media ==
"The China Probrem", along with the thirteen other episodes from South Park's twelfth season, were released on a three-disc DVD set and Blu-ray set in the United States on March 10, 2009. The sets included brief audio commentaries by Parker and Stone for each episode, a collection of deleted scenes, and two special mini-features, The Making of 'Major Boobage and Six Days to South Park.
