= South Park Republican =

Informal ideology of US Republicans

A South Park Republican is a type of Republican who holds center-right or libertarian political beliefs influenced by the popular American animated television series South Park. Many may hold generally conservative views on fiscal issues, but lean moderate or liberal in regard to social issues such as LGBTQ rights and abortion; they also oppose political correctness and perceived wokeness. The term is arguably a contemporary variation on the older classical liberal and liberal-conservative, with an overlay of pop culture aesthetic. South Park Republicans oppose right-wing populism, the Christian right, and Donald Trump – as Trump and his administration were mocked in the season 27 episode "Sermon on the 'Mount", which parodies his legal actions, relationship to Jeffrey Epstein, and his support among Christians. The term was coined by conservative political commentator Andrew Sullivan in 2001.

== See also ==
- Barstool conservatism
- Conservatism in the United States
- Factions in the Republican Party
- Horseshoe theory
- Intellectual dark web
- Liberal conservatism
- Libertarian conservatism
- Libertarianism in the United States
- Libertarian Republican
- Log Cabin Republicans
- Radical centrism
- Republican Liberty Caucus
- Rockefeller Republican
- South Park Conservatives
