= The Abyss Surrounds Us =

2016 young adult science fiction novel

- Author: Emily Skrutskie
- Language: English
- Series: The Abyss Surrounds Us
- Genre: Science fiction
- Published: 2016 (Flux)
- Publication place: United States
- Media type: Print (Trade Paperback)
- Pages: 273 (Trade Paperback edition)
- ISBN: 9780738746913
- Followed by: The Edge of the Abyss

The Abyss Surrounds Us is a 2016 young adult science fiction novel by Emily Skrutskie. It is the first in a duology.

== Plot ==
Cassandra Leung is at a dawn check up of her Reckoner Durga, one of many genetically engineered sea monsters bred and trained by Cas' family business. The Reckoners and their trainers act as paid protection for ships passing through the dangerous NeoPacific ocean. While checking up with Durga, Cas notes that it's making strange noises. She speaks to her mother, the lead biologist working on the Reckoner program, about this issue. Her mother suggests that her concerns are just nervousness for her first mission as Reckoner trainer. Cas begrudgingly relents.

The next day Cas boards the Nereid, a luxury cruise ship she is tasked to protect with Durga. As the days move forwards Cas grows increasingly concerned with Durga's heath, as its strange noises grow to violent tremors and the water becomes thick with its blood. Despite this, the captain of the Nereid rejects the idea of turning around. This is revealed to be a mistake when Cas wakes to news that a pirate ship was spotted approaching The Nereid. Durga, being too weak to fight the pirates, is brutally killed in front of Cas. The Nereid is then boarded by pirates, the crew is murdered, and Cas is dragged aboard the pirate ship Minnow. After a suicide attempt, she is brought before the captain of the Minnow, the notorious pirate Santa Elana. Santa Elana presents Cas with a Baby Reckoner, still in an embryonic sac, that she is to train for use by the Minnow against other Reckoners. Cas then becomes the ward of Swift, one of Santa Elana's lieutenants. Swift is to make sure Cas successfully raises the Reckoner pup, and becomes situated within the Minnow's culture. An arrangement neither are pleased with.

Cas next faces danger when she has to undergo the complicated process of birthing the Reckoner pup from its embryonic sac, knowing that if she fails she will likely die with it. The sac is carefully cut open with the Reckoner being safely released into a small pool. With the pup born Cas spends her time either on the training deck with the Reckoner baby she names Bao, or by Swift's side. Cas and Bao are often locked in the training deck together as Cas nurtures the infant Reckoner. Cas and Swift are made similarly inseparable by the constant threat of Cas being murdered or assaulted by a pirate in Swifts absence.

Despite this danger, Cas is successful in bringing Bao into adolescence, with the Reckoner now able to swim in the open ocean. The danger has also done little to stop Cas from bonding with Swift and Santa Elana's other Lieutenants. Cas is even cheered on by her captors when she rides Bao alongside The Minnow. Swift begins assisting Cas in training Bao, getting him to obey commands give via a LED beacon mounted on Cas' wrist. The two share a laugh at Cas saving Swift from almost being mauled by Bao whilst trying to feed. It is around this time Cas begins to have conflicting views of Swift, seeing her as both a captor and a guardian. A relationship that is complicated when Cas witnesses Swift take part in a raid against a civilian ship, and is reminded again that both Swift and herself are culpable for acts of violence perpetrated by the Minnow. That see could have taken Bao and defended the ship from The Minnow. That Swift, and maybe Cas herself, were pirates. Cas and Swift's relationship stagnates over the next few weeks following the raid, with much of their time together being spent in silence while training Bao. This awkward period is broken when Swift takes Cas into the Slew, a joint gym and combat arena. Cas bests Swift in a fight and the crowd of pirates cheers her victory. A sign of Cas' acceptance in pirate society.

Later, after Bao was nearly struck by The Minnow, Cas runs to check up on it. She arrives at the training deck to find one of Santa Elana's Lieutenants, Code, hovering above Bao with a syringe of poison in his hands. Still hidden, Cas watches as Swift runs into the deck and tackles Code to the ground. Together they subdue Code and bring him to Santa Elana. They quickly realize that Code attempted to kill Bao so Santa Elana would kill Cas and then Swift, thus insuring his place as Santa Elana's Successor. Shaken from their encounter, Cas and Swift spend the night in each other's company. Code is later executed by being fed to Bao, much to Cas' horror. Swift confronts Cas after she runs from the site of the execution, calling her a hypocrite for being appalled by the murder of Code by a Reckoner but not by the thousands who died at the hands of Reckoner Justice. In the ensuing fight Swift admits to caring deeply for Cas, a notion Cas rejects due to the power imbalance innate to their relationship.

The day after Cas and Swift's fight the Minnow Docks at The Flotilla, a floating city in the NeoPascific. Cas, being Swifts ward, is forced to accompany her into the city. Cas is surprised when Swift takes her to visit her families shack. After speaking with Swift's father, the two journey into the center of the Flotilla to shop. Eventually Swift leads them to a secluded rooftop where they speak about Swifts history as a pirate and being the breadwinner of her family. On their way back to the Minnow Cas is spotted by Fabian Murphey, an associate of her mother. Fabian tries to grab onto Cas, but she is pulled away by swift and the two escape the man by jumping off the Flotilla and into the ocean.

Back on the ship, Santa Elana explains to her crew that Fabian will likely inform the mainland military that the Minnow has a Reckoner in its arsenal, and that they can expect an attack on their ship by the military in about three days. Cas also learns that it was Fabian who supplied Santa Elana with a Reckoner pup, and is likely responsible for the death of Durga. Santa Elana gives Cas three days to make Bao combat ready and fight off the mainland attack. It takes her one day.

The first attack from the mainland comes early in the form of a squadron of quad-copters, which are shot down by the Minnow or swatted out of the air by Bao. Cas spends the next few hours working through her killing the quad-copter pilots. Ultimately Cas determines the killing was necessary. Later the next night Cas visits Swift at her gun position. They have a conversation about how they feel trapped by their circumstance, that they wish they could escape poverty, and piracy. It is also on the deck at night Cas and Swift wordlessly acknowledge their mutual romantic feelings, but know they can't been in a relationship with such an imbalance of power. The next morning the whole crew of the Minnow rallies to fight the second and final mainland attack. As Cas is preparing for battle on the training deck, she says her final goodbyes to Swift, believing she will be forced to bring Bao back to the mainland after the battle. It is here the couple shares their first kiss. Cas then rides Bao into battle, killing three other Reckoners and destroying their ships, allowing for the Minnow to escape.

Cas and Bao eventually catch up with the Minnow, and asks for an audience with Santa Elana. Cas admits she can no longer live on the mainland, that she has become, in her heart, a pirate and asks to be taken on as one of Santa Elana's lieutenants. Cas argues that if she lets Bao go the mainland will no longer hunt them. That she will make a good pirate, doing what ever is asked of her; except kill another Reckoner. It is at this point that Santa Elana informs Cas that Swift was the one who poisoned Durga, so a Reckoner killer is unneeded. Made numb by betrayal, Cas frees Bao by drops her Training Beacon into the ocean, and officially joins the Minnow's crew.

=== Publication history ===
2016, US, Flux ISBN 9780738746913, Pub date 8 February 2016, Trade Paperback

== Themes ==
=== Moral Relativism ===
The Abyss Surrounds Us posits that neither the mainland or pirate society are wholly moral or immoral. Instead it takes a stance of moral relativism. It shows that characters from the, assumed morally bankrupt, pirate society justify their violence as survival, and are shown to be caring people capable of morality. Similarly it shows the mainland society, which believe itself to be morally upstanding, kill innocents with Reckoners in its policing of piracy. The book ultimately posits that there is no objective standard of morality, and that morality is instead a societal construct.

=== Queer Romance ===
Both Cas and Swift are lesbians, with Cas mentioning having had girlfriends in the past and Swift being shown with a woman in her lap after a raid. Depiction of Cas and Swift's relationship is unique in that there is no homophobia in the future depicted in The Abyss surrounds Us, and the two women are never judged or persecuted for their homosexuality. Homosexuality, in their world, is entirely accepted and integrated into society. Their relationship is treated as a normal and uneventful phenomenon.

=== Climate Change ===
The Abyss Surrounds Us takes place in a future society that has already experienced catastrophic climate change, an event referred to as "The Schism", and has been altered significantly because of it. In the opening pages of the book we are give a map of the NeoPacific, the Pacific ocean which has expanded deep into continents after the rapid melting of glaciers. We also see global civil unrest and anarchism, with many global powers such as America, China, and India designating into smaller states. The Abyss Surrounds Us also displays the human cost of catastrophic Climate Change. Early in the book the protagonist meets and elderly man who tells her his account of the collapse of a massive sea wall which protected California from rising sea levels, and the millions of deaths and the hardships endured because of it. Many of those effected by the Schism would become refugees and forced to live in floating cities on the NeoPacific, such as the Flotilla which Cas visits. The Abyss surrounds us could be viewed as a cautionary tale about the dangers of unmitigated climate change.

== Reception ==
The novel received a starred review from Kirkus Reviews.

The Abyss Surrounds Us was a Junior Library Guild selection.

== Sequel ==
A sequel, The Edge of the Abyss, was published 18 April 2017.
