= South Park Conservatives =

2005 book by Brian C. Anderson

South Park Conservatives: The Revolt Against Liberal Media Bias
- Author: Brian C. Anderson
- Language: English
- Genre: Political
- Publication date: 2005
- Publication place: United States
- Media type: Print
- ISBN: 0-89526-019-0

South Park Conservatives: The Revolt Against Liberal Media Bias is a 2005 book by Brian C. Anderson.

It explores the idea that the traditional mass media in the United States is biased towards liberals.

It goes on to outline that through new media, such as the Internet, cable television, and talk radio, conservatives are slowly gaining some power in the world of information.

The name South Park Conservatives derives from Andrew Sullivan's term, "South Park Republican."

== See also ==
- Subject matter in South Park
