= Shaky camera =

Film technique where the camera is shaken for effect

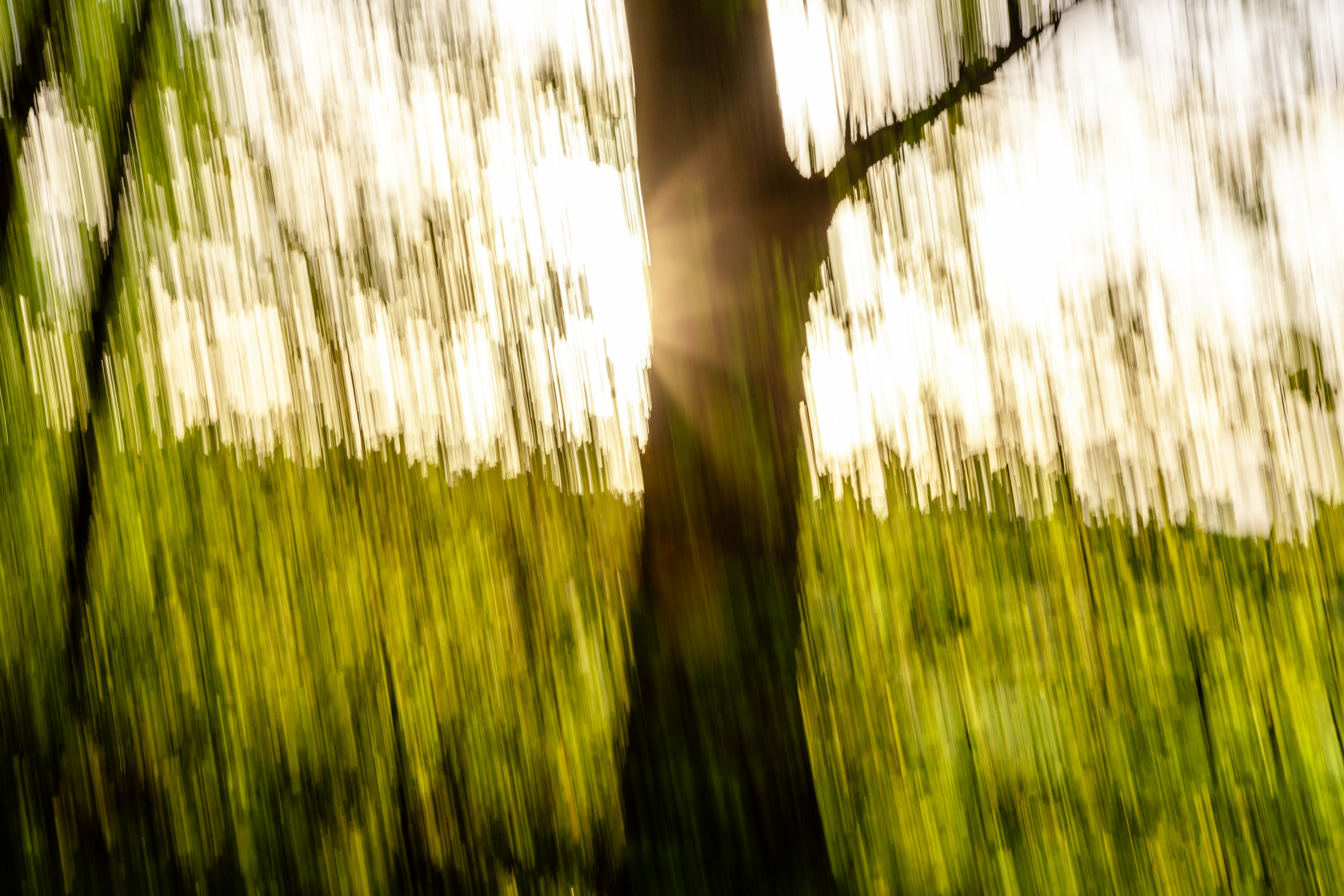
Photograph of a tree, sun, and grass while deliberately shaking the camera

Shaky camera, shaky cam, jerky camera, queasy cam, run-and-gun or free camera is a cinematographic technique where stable-image techniques are purposely dispensed with shaking. It is a hand-held camera, or given the appearance of being hand-held, and in many cases shots are limited to what one photographer could have accomplished with one camera. Shaky cam is often employed to give a film sequence an ad hoc, electronic news-gathering, or documentary film feel. It suggests unprepared, unrehearsed filming of reality, and can provide a sense of dynamics, immersion, instability or nervousness. The technique can be used to give a pseudo-documentary or cinéma vérité appearance to a film.

Too much shaky camera motion can make some viewers feel distracted, dizzy or sick.

== History ==
Traditionally, still and motion photography have relied on firm, stable mountings for a jitter-free image. Great effort is spent to obtain a perfectly stable image. However, experiments with hand-held camera began as early as 1925 with Ewald André Dupont's Varieté and Abel Gance's Napoléon.

Hand-held camera movements became more prominent in some feature films of the 1960s, including a number of John Cassavetes-directed films. Jonas Mekas named and defended the "shaky camera" work of avant-garde filmmakers, writing in Film Culture in 1962 that he was "sick and tired of the guardians of Cinema Art" accusing the new cinematographers of poor camera skills. Mekas saw it as an inexpensive improvisational technique, one that allowed for greater artistic and financial freedom. Other examples of 1960s hand-held usage include The Miracle Worker, Seven Days in May, The Battle of Algiers and Dr. Strangelove. The Japanese filmmaker Kinji Fukasaku was known for using shaky hand-held camera shots as a trademark in many of his films, most notably 1970s yakuza films such as Battles Without Honor and Humanity as well as in Battle Royale.

In 1981, the "shaky cam" style was named, and given new energy. In the film The Evil Dead, director Sam Raimi ordered Tim Philo, his cinematographer, to bolt a camera to a two-by-four-inch piece of lumber, 22 inches long, and have two strong grips hold it and run down a city block, bumping over fallen bodies, following a female character, after which the camera was swung roughly around to go the other way. Another shaky camera effect invented on that film was one the crew called "Blank-O-Cam", where the cameraman would lie on a blanket and be carried in it by four grips, the camera pointed forward near ground level to track people's feet. Further shaky cam techniques were employed by Raimi on his subsequent films including Crimewave in 1985.

In 1984, the Coen brothers and their cinematographer Barry Sonnenfeld used shaky cam techniques in Blood Simple, then again in 1987's Raising Arizona. Woody Allen's improvisational style of filmmaking was matched with hand-held camera techniques in Husbands and Wives, shot by Carlo Di Palma in 1991 and 1992. The film's opening scene uses the hand-held style to achieve a sense of "free-floating anxiety and terminal loss of moorings." Reviewers joked that Dramamine was required to prevent motion sickness. Allen and Di Palma continued to use the technique but with more finesse and restraint on Manhattan Murder Mystery and subsequent films throughout the 1990s to save time spent on principal photography, and to stay within budget.

The 1993 police drama NYPD Blue is recognized by many as the first television show to use shaky and swooping shots for most of its camera work. In 1994, the TV series ER employed shaky camera techniques, as did the 1996 disaster film Twister. Danish director Lars von Trier used shaky camera, called 'free camera', in his movies. The Dogme 95 movement he co-created in 1995 was partly based on the technique. Trier's 2000 film Dancer in the Dark was criticized for having too much shaky camera motion.

Janusz Kamiński, cinematographer for Steven Spielberg on 1998's Saving Private Ryan, used a traditionally shot scene of a modern-day cemetery to open the film. For the initial action sequence, he used the hand-held camera technique to depict the gritty intensity and brutality of the 1944 Normandy beach assault on D-Day, from the boat to the beach and beyond. The 1999 film The Blair Witch Project made extensive use of shaky cam to make the film look like recovered documentary camera footage. In 2009, the Dutch film Winter in Wartime made use of the shaky cam. The 2004 film The Bourne Supremacy and the 2007 films The Bourne Ultimatum and The Kingdom make much use of the shaky camera.

== Reactions ==
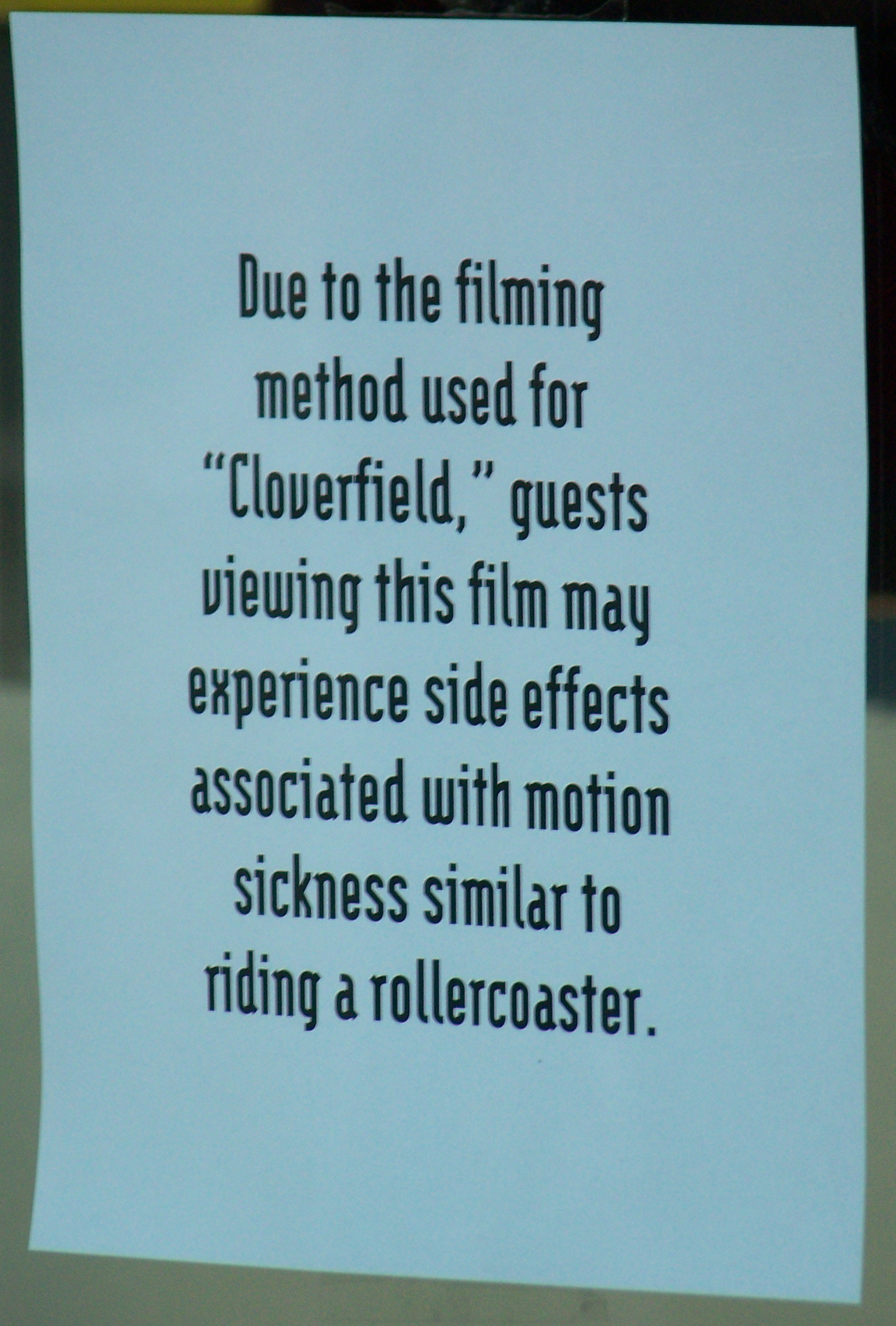
Sign at an AMC theater warning customers about side effects relating to motion sickness due to the shaky camera technique being used in Cloverfield.

Several films have been criticized for excessive shaky camera technique. The second and third installments of the Bourne action film franchise directed by Paul Greengrass were described by film critic Roger Ebert as using both shaky cam and fast editing techniques. Ebert did not mind it but many of his readers complained—one calling it "Queasicam". Film professors David Bordwell and Kristin Thompson described the development of the technique over 80 years of cinema and noted that Greengrass used more than the usual shaky camera motion to make it intentionally jerky and bouncy, coupled with a very short average shot length and a decision to incompletely frame the action.

The films Friday Night Lights (2004), Cloverfield (2008) and American Honey (2016) have been described as making viewers nauseated or sick.

Director Christopher McQuarrie has criticized the technique as a gimmick used to try and hide the lack of real energy in a scene.

== See also ==
- Direct cinema
- Dutch angle
- Found footage (film technique)
- Jump cut
- Pan and scan
- Tilt (camera)
- History of film
