= Brian C. Anderson =

American writer and editor of City Journal

- Born: United States
- Occupation(s): Writer, editor

Brian C. Anderson is an American writer and editor of City Journal, a quarterly magazine, published by the Manhattan Institute for Policy Research.

Anderson received his BA and MA from Boston College. He obtained a doctorate in political philosophy from the University of Ottawa.

Anderson served as previously literary editor of Crisis during most of the 1990s.

In the late 1990s, he became a senior editor at the City Journal, a quarterly magazine, published by the Manhattan Institute for Policy Research. In 2007, he became editor-in-chief there.

== Works ==
Books

- A Manifesto for Media Freedom (2008)
- Democratic Capitalism and Its Discontents (2007)
- South Park Conservatives: The Revolt Against Liberal Media Bias (2005)
- The Pope in America (1996)
- Raymond Aron: The Recovery of the Political (1998)

Editor

- On Cultivating Liberty (Rowman & Littlefield 1999), a collection of Michael Novak's social and political writings
