= South Park =

American animated sitcom

- Title card featuring the four main characters: Stan, Kyle, Kenny, and Cartman
- Genre: Animated sitcom; Black comedy; Comedy drama; Satire; Surreal humour
- Created by: Trey Parker; Matt Stone
- Showrunners: Trey Parker; Matt Stone
- Voices of: Trey Parker; Matt Stone; Mary Kay Bergman; Isaac Hayes; Eliza Schneider; Mona Marshall; April Stewart; Adrien Beard
- Theme music composer: Primus
- Composers: Adam Berry; Scott Nickoley; Jamie Dunlap
- Country of origin: United States
- Original language: English
- No. of seasons: 29
- No. of episodes: 343 (list of episodes)

Production
- Executive producers: Trey Parker; Matt Stone; Brian Graden; Deborah Liebling; Frank C. Agnone II; Bruce Howell; Anne Garefino
- Producers: Vernon Chatman; Eric Stough; Bruce Howell; Adrien Beard; Jack Shih
- Cinematography: Kenny Gioseffi
- Running time: 22 minutes
- Production companies: Comedy Partners; South Park Studios (Note: Originally known as Braniff Productions from 1997 to 2006, and Parker-Stone Productions from 2006 to 2007.); Celluloid Studios (pilot)

Original release
- Network: Comedy Central; Paramount+
- Release: August 13, 1997 – present

Related
- The Spirit of Christmas

South Park is an American animated sitcom created by Trey Parker and Matt Stone for Comedy Central. The series revolves around four boys—Stan Marsh, Kyle Broflovski, Eric Cartman, and Kenny McCormick—and their adventures in and around the titular Colorado town. South Park also features many recurring characters. The series became infamous for its profanity and dark, surreal humor that satirizes a large range of subject matter.

Parker and Stone developed South Park from two animated short films, both titled The Spirit of Christmas, released in 1992 and 1995. The second short became one of the first viral Internet videos, leading to the series' production. The pilot episode was produced using cutout animation; the remainder of the series uses computer animation based on the cutout technique. Since the fourth season, episodes have generally been written and produced during the week preceding their broadcast, with Parker serving as the lead writer and director.

Since its debut on August 13, 1997, 343 episodes of South Park have been broadcast. It debuted with great success, consistently earning the highest ratings of any basic cable program. Subsequent ratings have varied, but it remains one of Comedy Central's longest-running programs. In August 2021, South Park was renewed through 2027, and a series of television specials was announced for Paramount+, the first two of which were released later that year. In October 2019, it was announced that WarnerMedia had acquired exclusive streaming rights to South Park starting in June 2020 for HBO Max. After the HBO Max deal expired in late June 2025, on July 21, 2025, Parker and Stone announced a five-year agreement with Paramount+ to stream the series exclusively and to have 10 episodes produced per year. The twenty-ninth season premiered on September 16, 2026. It is the second-longest-running American animated series, only behind The Simpsons.

South Park has received critical acclaim, and is included in various publications' lists of the greatest television shows. It has received numerous accolades, including six Primetime Emmy Awards and a Peabody Award. A theatrical film, South Park: Bigger, Longer & Uncut, was released in June 1999 to commercial and critical success, garnering an Academy Award nomination. In 2013, TV Guide ranked South Park the tenth Greatest TV Cartoon of All Time.

== Premise ==
=== Setting and characters ===
South Park centers around four boys: Stan Marsh, Kyle Broflovski, Eric Cartman and Kenny McCormick. The boys live in the fictional small town of South Park, located within the real-life South Park basin in the Rocky Mountains of central Colorado, approximately a one-hour drive from Denver. The town is also home to an assortment of other characters, including students, families, and elementary school staff. Prominent settings include South Park Elementary, various neighborhoods and the surrounding mountain range, actual Colorado landmarks, and the businesses along the town's main street, all of which are based on the appearance of similar locations in Fairplay, Colorado. As one of the few television programs set in the Mountain West region that takes place outside the urban core of Denver, South Park frequently features the unique culture of the region, including cattle ranchers, Old West theme parks, snowy climates, mountaineering, Mormons, real-life Colorado locations such as Casa Bonita and Cave of the Winds, and many other regionally specific characteristics.

Stan is portrayed as an average American boy; however, he has many mishaps throughout the series. Between the twenty-second and twenty-seventh seasons, Stan and his family resided in Tegridy Farms, before it was sold during the events of the episode "Sickofancy". Kyle is Jewish, and his portrayal as one of the few such people in South Park is often satirized. Stan is modeled after Parker, while Kyle is modeled after Stone. They are best friends, and symbolically intended to reflect Parker and Stone's friendship, which is a common topic throughout the series. Cartman (as he is commonly referred to) is amoral and increasingly psychopathic, and is commonly portrayed as an antagonist. His staunch antisemitism has resulted in a progressive rivalry with Kyle. Kenny, who comes from a poor family, tightly wears his parka hood to the point where it obscures most of his face and muffles his speech. During the first five seasons, Kenny died in almost every episode, only to reappear in the next with no clear explanation. He was killed off in the fifth season episode "Kenny Dies", before being reintroduced in the sixth season finale, "Red Sleigh Down". Since then, Kenny has been depicted as dying sporadically. The children were in third grade for the first three seasons and have been in fourth grade since the show's fourth season.

Plots are often set in motion by events, ranging from the fairly typical to the supernatural and extraordinary, which frequently happen in the town. The boys often act as the voice of reason when these events cause panic or incongruous behavior among the adult populace, who are customarily depicted as irrational, gullible, and prone to overreaction. They are frequently confused by the contradictory and hypocritical behavior of their parents and other adults, and often perceive them as having distorted views on morality and society.

=== Themes and style ===
Each episode opens with a tongue-in-cheek all persons fictitious disclaimer: "All characters and events in this show—even those based on real people—are entirely fictional. All celebrity voices are impersonated.....poorly. The following program contains coarse language and due to its content it should not be viewed by anyone."

South Park was the first weekly program to be rated TV-MA, and is generally intended for adult audiences. The boys and most other child characters use strong profanity, with only the most taboo words being bleeped during a typical broadcast. Parker and Stone perceive this as the manner in which real-life small boys speak when they are alone.

South Park commonly makes use of carnivalesque and absurdist techniques, numerous running gags, violence, sexual content, offhand pop-cultural references, and satirical portrayal of celebrities.

Early episodes tended to be shock value-oriented and featured more slapstick-style humor. While social satire had been used on the show occasionally earlier on, it became more prevalent as the series progressed, with the show retaining some of its focus on the boys' fondness of scatological humor in an attempt to remind adult viewers "what it was like to be eight years old". Parker and Stone also began further developing other characters by giving them larger roles in certain storylines, and began writing plots as parables based on religion, politics, and numerous other topics. This provided the opportunity for the show to spoof both extreme sides of contentious issues, while lampooning both liberal and conservative points of view. Rebecca Raphael described the show as "an equal opportunity offender", while Parker and Stone describe their main purpose as to "be funny" and "make people laugh", while stating that no particular topic or group of people be exempt from mockery and satire.

Parker and Stone insist that the show is still more about "kids being kids" and "what it's like to be in [elementary school] in America", stating that the introduction of a more satirical element to the series was the result of the two adding more of a "moral center" to the show so that it would rely less on simply being crude and shocking in an attempt to maintain an audience. While profane, Parker notes that there is still an "underlying sweetness" aspect to the child characters, and Time described the boys as "sometimes cruel but with a core of innocence". Usually, the boys or other characters pondered over what transpired during an episode and conveyed the important lesson taken from it with a short monologue. During earlier seasons, this speech commonly began with a variation of the phrase "You know, I've learned something today...".

== Development ==
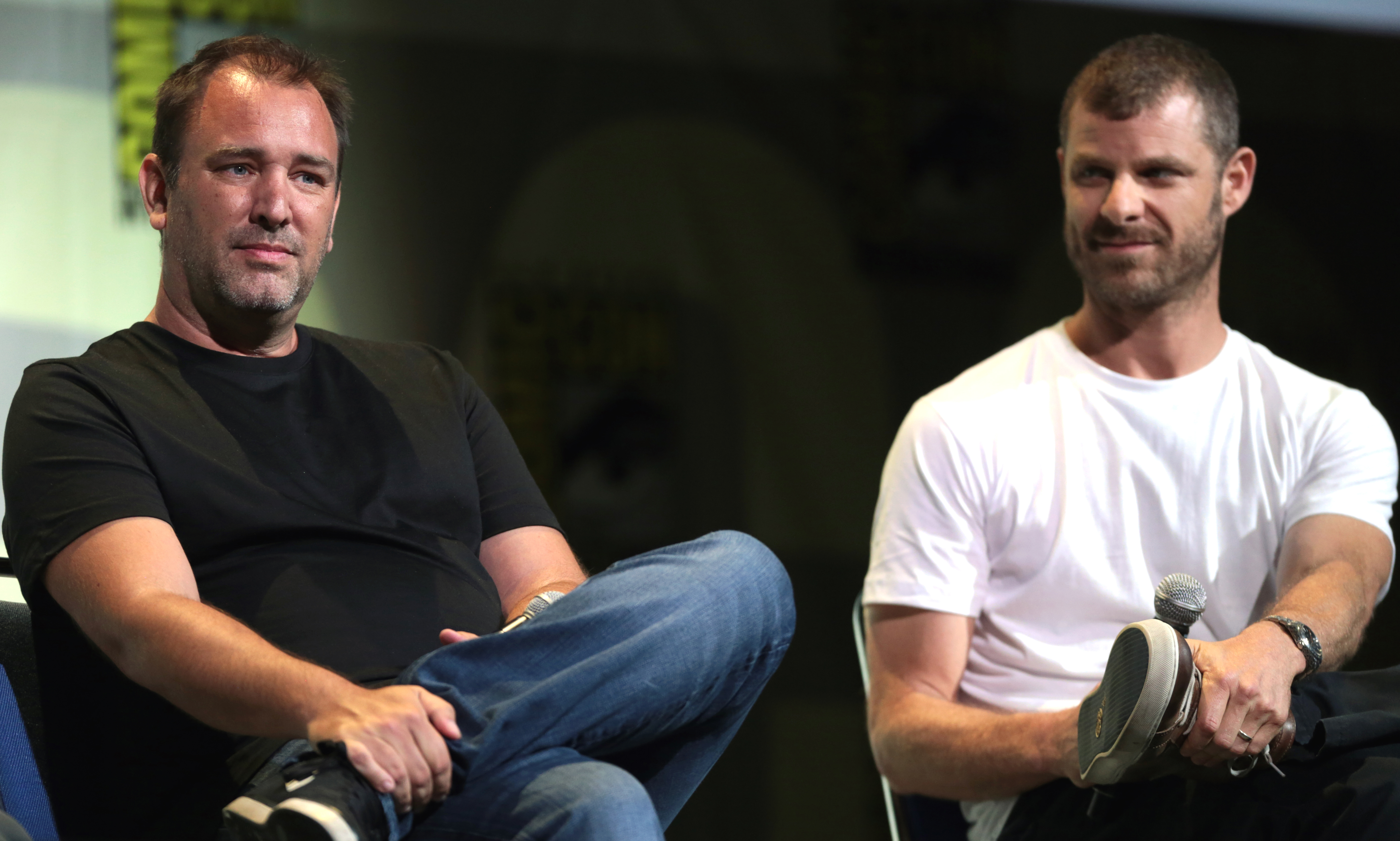
South Park creators Trey Parker (left) and Matt Stone continue to do most of the writing, directing and voice acting on the show.

Parker and Stone met in film class at the University of Colorado in 1992 and discovered a shared love of Monty Python, which they often cite as one of their primary inspirations. They created an animated short entitled The Spirit of Christmas. The film was created by animating construction paper cutouts with stop motion, and features prototypes of the main characters of South Park, including a character resembling Cartman but named "Kenny", an unnamed character resembling what is today Kenny, and two near-identical unnamed characters who resemble Stan and Kyle. Fox Broadcasting Company executive and mutual friend Brian Graden commissioned Parker and Stone to create a second short film as a video Christmas card. Created in 1995, the second The Spirit of Christmas short resembled the style of the later series more closely. To differentiate between the two homonymous shorts, the first short is often referred to as Jesus vs. Frosty, and the second short as Jesus vs. Santa. Graden sent copies of the video to several of his friends, and from there it was copied and distributed, including on the internet, where it became one of the first viral videos.

As Jesus vs. Santa became more popular, Parker and Stone began talks of developing the short into a television series about four children residing in a fictional Colorado town in the real-life South Park basin. Fox eagerly agreed to meet with the duo about the show's premise, having prided itself on edgier products such as Cops, The Simpsons, and The X-Files. However, during the meeting at the Fox office in Century City, disagreements between the two creators and the network began to arise, mainly over the latter's refusal to air a show that included a supporting talking stool character named Mr. Hankey. Some executives at 20th Century Fox Television (which was to produce the series) agreed with its then-sister network's stance on Mr. Hankey and repeatedly requested Parker and Stone to remove the character in order for the show to proceed. Refusing to meet their demands, the duo cut ties with Fox and its sister companies all together and began shopping the series somewhere else.

The two then entered negotiations with both MTV and Comedy Central. Parker preferred the show be produced by Comedy Central, fearing that MTV would turn it into a kids show. When Comedy Central executive Doug Herzog watched the short, he commissioned for it to be developed into a series. Parker and Stone assembled a small staff and spent three months creating the pilot episode "Cartman Gets an Anal Probe". South Park was in danger of being canceled before it even aired when the show fared poorly with test audiences, particularly with women. However, the shorts were still gaining more popularity over the Internet, and Comedy Central ordered a run of six episodes. South Park debuted with "Cartman Gets an Anal Probe" on August 13, 1997.

== Production ==
Except for the pilot episode, which was produced using cutout animation, all episodes of South Park are created with the use of software, primarily Autodesk Maya. As opposed to the pilot, which took three months to complete, and other animated sitcoms, which are traditionally hand-drawn by companies in South Korea in a process that takes roughly eight to nine months, individual episodes of South Park take significantly less time to produce. Using computers as an animation method, the show's production staff were able to generate an episode in about three weeks during the first seasons. Now, with a staff of about 70 people, episodes are typically completed in one week, with some in as little as three to four days. Nearly the entire production of an episode is accomplished within one set of offices, which were originally at a complex in Westwood, Los Angeles, California and are now part of South Park Studios in Culver City, California. Parker and Stone have been the show's executive producers throughout its entire history. Debbie Liebling, who was Senior Vice President of original programming and development for Comedy Central, also served as an executive producer during the show's first five seasons, coordinating the show's production efforts between South Park Studios and Comedy Central's headquarters in New York City. During its early stages, finished episodes of South Park were hastily recorded to D-2 to be sent to Comedy Central for airing in just a few days' time. Each episode used to cost $250,000.

=== Writing ===
The Border Patrol raid during the Elián González affair is referenced in "Quintuplets 2000", which aired within the same week the event occurred.

Scripts are not written before a season begins. Production of an episode begins on a Thursday, with the show's writing consultants brainstorming with Parker and Stone. Former staff writers include Pam Brady, who has since written scripts for the films Hot Rod, Hamlet 2 and Team America: World Police (with Parker and Stone), and Nancy Pimental, who served as co-host of Win Ben Stein's Money and wrote the film The Sweetest Thing after her tenure with the show during its first three seasons. Television producer and writer Norman Lear, an idol of both Parker and Stone, and who also saw South Park as a way to bond with his son Benjamin, served as a guest writing consultant for the season seven (2003) episodes "Cancelled" and "I'm a Little Bit Country". During the 12th and 13th seasons, Saturday Night Live actor and writer Bill Hader served as a creative consultant and co-producer.

After exchanging ideas, Parker will write a script, and from there the entire team of animators, editors, technicians, and sound engineers will each typically work 100–120 hours in the ensuing week. Since the show's fourth season (2000), Parker has assumed most of the show's directorial duties, while Stone relinquished his share of the directing to focus on handling the coordination and business aspects of the production. On Wednesday, a completed episode is sent to Comedy Central's headquarters via satellite uplink, sometimes just a few hours before its air time of 10 PM Eastern Time.

Parker and Stone state that subjecting themselves to a one-week deadline creates more spontaneity amongst themselves in the creative process, which they feel results in a funnier show. The schedule also allows South Park to both stay more topical and respond more quickly to specific current events than other satiric animated shows. One of the earliest examples of this was in the season four (2000) episode "Quintuplets 2000", which references the United States Border Patrol's raid of a house during the Elián González affair, an event which occurred only four days before the episode originally aired. The season nine (2005) episode "Best Friends Forever" references the Terri Schiavo case, and originally aired in the midst of the controversy and less than 12 hours before she died. A scene in the season seven (2003) finale "It's Christmas in Canada" references the discovery of dictator Saddam Hussein in a "spider hole" and his subsequent capture, which happened a mere three days prior to the episode airing. The season 12 (2008) episode "About Last Night..." revolves around Barack Obama's victory in the 2008 presidential election, and aired less than 24 hours after Obama was declared the winner, using segments of dialogue from Obama's real victory speech.

On October 16, 2013, the show failed to meet their production deadline for the first time ever, after a power outage on October 15 at the production studio prevented the episode, season 17's "Goth Kids 3: Dawn of the Posers", from being finished in time. The episode was rescheduled to air a week later on October 23, 2013.

=== Animation ===
The various stages of production (from top to bottom): the storyboard sketch, the CorelDRAW props with stock character models, and a frame from the fully rendered episode, "Super Fun Time"

The show's style of animation is inspired by the paper cut-out cartoons made by Terry Gilliam for Monty Python's Flying Circus, of which Parker and Stone have been lifelong fans. Construction paper and traditional stop motion cutout animation techniques were used in the original animated shorts and in the pilot episode. Subsequent episodes have been produced by computer animation, providing a similar look to the originals while requiring a fraction of the time to produce. Before computer artists begin animating an episode, a series of animatics drawn in Toon Boom are provided by the show's storyboard artists.

The characters and objects are composed of simple geometrical shapes and primary and secondary colors. Most child characters are the same size and shape, and are distinguished by their clothing, hair and skin colors, and headwear. Characters are mostly presented two-dimensionally and from only one angle. Their movements are animated in an intentionally jerky fashion, as they are purposely not offered the same free range of motion associated with hand-drawn characters. Occasionally, some non-fictional characters are depicted with photographic cutouts of their actual head and face in lieu of a face reminiscent of the show's traditional style. Canadians on the show are often portrayed in an even more minimalist fashion; they have simple beady eyes, and the top halves of their heads simply flap up and down when the characters speak.

When the show began using computers, the cardboard cutouts were scanned and re-drawn with CorelDRAW, then imported into PowerAnimator, which was used with SGI workstations to animate the characters. The workstations were linked to a 54-processor render farm that could render 10 to 15 shots an hour. Beginning with season five, the animators began using Maya instead of PowerAnimator. As of 2012, the studio ran a 120-processor render farm that can produce 30 or more shots an hour.

PowerAnimator and Maya are high-end programs mainly used for 3D computer graphics, while co-producer and former animation director Eric Stough notes that PowerAnimator was initially chosen because its features helped animators retain the show's "homemade" look. PowerAnimator was also used for making some of the show's visual effects, which are now created using Motion, a newer graphics program created by Apple, Inc. for their Mac OS X operating system. The show's visual quality has improved in recent seasons, though several other techniques are used to intentionally preserve the cheap cutout animation look.

A few episodes feature sections of live-action footage, while others have incorporated other styles of animation. Portions of the season eight (2004) premiere "Good Times with Weapons" are done in anime style, while the season 10 episode "Make Love, Not Warcraft" is done partly in machinima. The season 12 episode "Major Boobage", a homage to the 1981 animated film Heavy Metal, implements scenes accomplished with rotoscoping.

=== Voice cast ===
Parker and Stone voice most of the male South Park characters. Mary Kay Bergman voiced the majority of the female characters until her death in November 1999. Mona Marshall and Eliza Schneider succeeded Bergman, with Schneider leaving the show after its seventh season (2003). She was replaced by April Stewart, who, along with Marshall, continues to voice most of the female characters. Bergman was originally listed in the credits under the alias Shannen Cassidy to protect her reputation as the voice of several Disney and other kid-friendly characters. Stewart was originally credited under the name Gracie Lazar, while Schneider was sometimes credited under her rock opera performance pseudonym Blue Girl.

Other voice actors and members of South Park's production staff have voiced minor characters for various episodes, while a few staff members voice recurring characters. Supervising producer Jennifer Howell voices student Bebe Stevens; co-producer and storyboard artist Adrien Beard voices Tolkien Black, (Note: Formerly Token Black; retconned in "The Big Fix".) who was the school's only African-American student until the introduction of Nichole in "Cartman Finds Love"; writing consultant Vernon Chatman voices an anthropomorphic towel named Towelie; and production supervisor John Hansen voices Mr. Slave, the former gay lover of Mr. Garrison. Throughout the show's run, the voices for toddler and kindergarten characters have been provided by various small children of the show's production staff.

When voicing child characters, the voice actors speak within their normal vocal range while adding a childlike inflection. The recorded audio is then edited with Pro Tools, and the pitch is altered to make the voice sound more like that of a fourth grader.

Isaac Hayes voiced the character of Chef, an African-American, soul-singing cafeteria worker who was one of the few adults the boys consistently trusted. Hayes agreed to voice the character after being among Parker and Stone's ideal candidates, which also included Lou Rawls and Barry White. Hayes, who lived and hosted a radio show in New York during his tenure with South Park, recorded his dialogue on a digital audio tape while a director gave directions over the phone, after which the tape would be shipped to the show's production studio in California. After Hayes left the show in early 2006, the character of Chef was killed off in the season 10 (2006) premiere "The Return of Chef".

==== Guest stars ====
Celebrities who are depicted on the show are usually impersonated, though some celebrities do their own voices for the show. Celebrities who have voiced themselves include Michael Buffer, Brent Musburger, Jay Leno, Robert Smith, and the bands Radiohead and Korn. Comedy team Cheech & Chong voiced characters representing their likenesses for the season four (2000) episode "Cherokee Hair Tampons", which was the duo's first collaborative effort in 20 years. Malcolm McDowell appears in live-action sequences as the narrator of the season four episode "Pip".

Jennifer Aniston, Richard Belzer, Natasha Henstridge, Norman Lear, and Peter Serafinowicz have guest starred as other speaking characters. During South Park's earliest seasons, several high-profile celebrities inquired about guest-starring on the show. As a joke, Parker and Stone responded by offering low-profile, non-speaking roles, most of which were accepted; George Clooney provided the barks for Stan's dog Sparky in the season one (1997) episode "Big Gay Al's Big Gay Boat Ride", Leno provided the meows for Cartman's cat in the season one finale "Cartman's Mom Is a Dirty Slut", and Henry Winkler voiced the various growls and grunts of a kid-eating monster in the season two (1998) episode "City on the Edge of Forever". Jerry Seinfeld offered to lend his voice for the Thanksgiving episode "Starvin' Marvin", but declined to appear when he was only offered a role as "Turkey #2".

=== Music ===
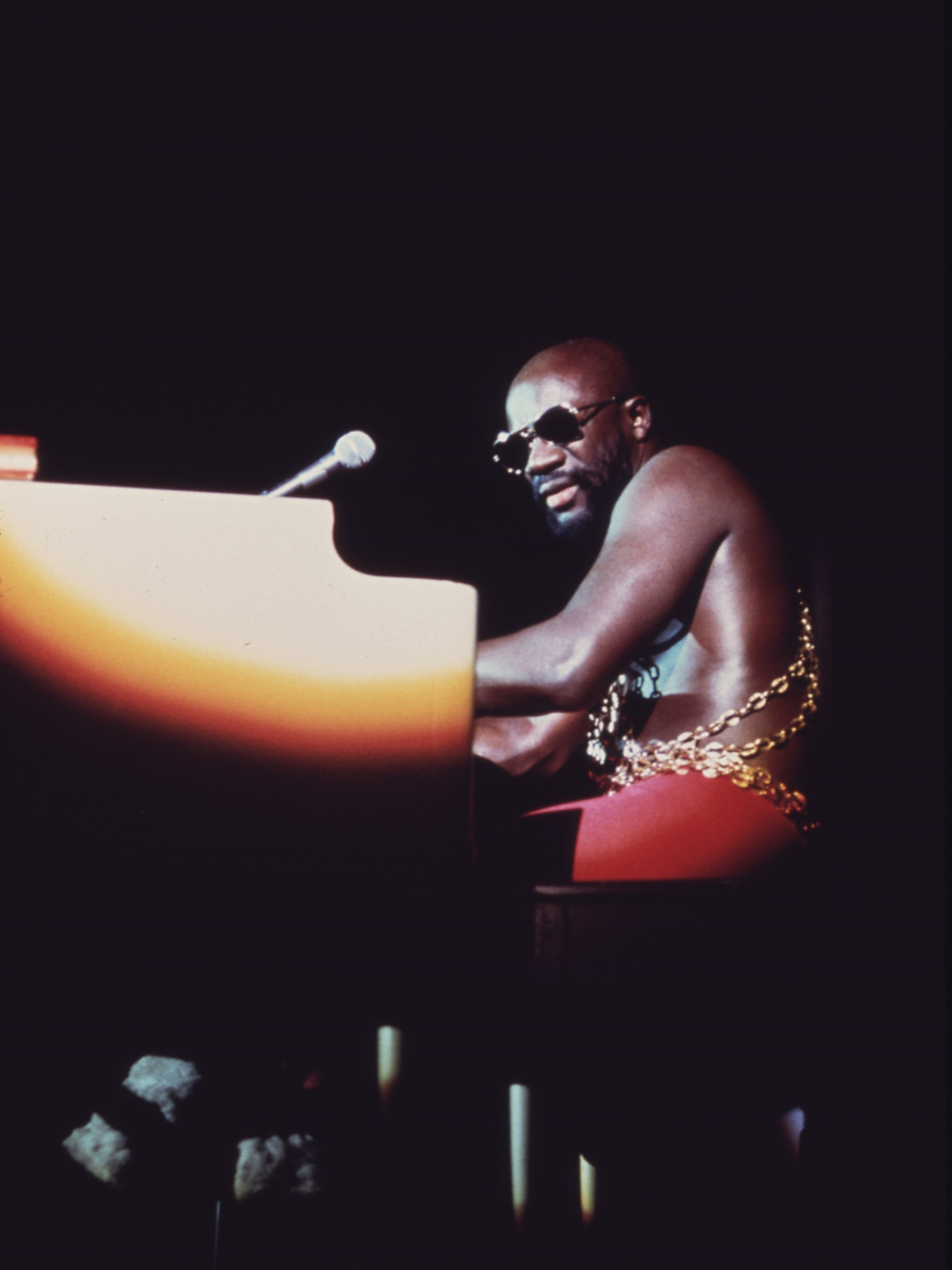
Chef would often sing in a style reminiscent of that of his voice actor, Isaac Hayes.

Parker says that the varying uses of music are of utmost importance to South Park. Several characters often play or sing songs in order to change or influence a group's behavior, or to educate, motivate, or indoctrinate others. The show also frequently features scenes in which its characters have disapproving reactions to the performances of certain popular musicians.

Adam Berry, the show's original score composer, used sound synthesis to simulate a small orchestra, and frequently alluded to existing famous pieces of music. Berry also used signature acoustic guitar and mandolin cues as leitmotifs for the show's establishing shots. After Berry left in 2001, Jamie Dunlap and Scott Nickoley of the Los Angeles-based Mad City Production Studios provided the show's original music for the next seven seasons. Since 2008, Dunlap has been credited as the show's sole score composer. Dunlap's contributions to the show are one of the few that are not achieved at the show's own production offices. Dunlap reads a script, creates a score using digital audio software, and then e-mails the audio file to South Park Studios, where it is edited to fit with the completed episode.

In addition to singing in an effort to explain something to the children, Chef would also sing about things relevant to what had transpired in the plot. These songs were original compositions written by Parker, and they were performed by Hayes in the same sexually suggestive R&B style he had used during his own music career. The band DVDA, which consists of Parker and Stone, along with show staff members Bruce Howell and D.A. Young, performed the music for these compositions and, until the character's death on the show, were listed as "Chef's Band" in the closing credits.

Rick James, Elton John, Meat Loaf, Joe Strummer, Ozzy Osbourne, Primus, Rancid, and Ween all guest starred and briefly performed in the season two (1998) episode "Chef Aid". Korn debuted their single "Falling Away from Me" as guest stars on the season three (1999) episode "Korn's Groovy Pirate Ghost Mystery".

==== Main theme ====
The show's theme song was a musical score performed by the band Primus, with the lyrics alternately sung by the band's lead singer, Les Claypool, and the show's four central characters during the opening title sequence. Kenny's muffled lines are altered after every few seasons. His lines are usually sexually explicit in nature, such as his original lines, "I like girls with big fat titties, I like girls with deep vaginas".

The original unaired opening composition was originally slower and had a length of 40 seconds. This was deemed too long for the opening sequence, and was sped up, with Claypool re-recording his vocals for the final version. The instrumental version of the original composition is often played during the show's closing credits.

The opening song played in the first four seasons (and the end credits in all seasons) has a folk rock instrumentation with bass guitar, trumpets and rhythmic drums. Its beat is fast in the opening and leisurely in the closing credits. It is in the minor key and it features a tritone or a diminished fifth, creating a melodic dissonance, which captures the show's surrealistic nature. In the latter parts of seasons 4 and 5, the opening tune has an electro funk arrangement with pop qualities. Seasons 6–9 have a sprightly bluegrass instrumentation with a usage of banjo and is set in the major key. For the later seasons, the arrangement is electro rock with a breakbeat influence, which feature electric guitars backed up by synthesized, groovy drumbeats.

The opening theme song has been remixed three times during the course of the series, including a remix performed by Paul Robb. In 2006, the theme music was remixed with the song "Whamola" by Colonel Les Claypool's Fearless Flying Frog Brigade, from the album Purple Onion. For the twenty-ninth season, the song was re-recorded with the lyrics were altered to replace "South Park" with "South America" to reflect the season's rebrand.

== Episodes ==
Season	Episodes	Originally released		
Season	Episodes	First released	Last released	Network
1	13	August 13, 1997	February 25, 1998	Comedy Central
2	18	April 1, 1998	January 20, 1999	Comedy Central
3	17	April 7, 1999	January 12, 2000	Comedy Central
4	17	April 5, 2000	December 20, 2000	Comedy Central
5	14	June 20, 2001	December 12, 2001	Comedy Central
6	17	March 6, 2002	December 11, 2002	Comedy Central
7	15	March 19, 2003	December 17, 2003	Comedy Central
8	14	March 17, 2004	December 15, 2004	Comedy Central
9	14	March 9, 2005	December 7, 2005	Comedy Central
10	14	March 22, 2006	November 15, 2006	Comedy Central
11	14	March 7, 2007	November 14, 2007	Comedy Central
12	14	March 12, 2008	November 19, 2008	Comedy Central
13	14	March 11, 2009	November 18, 2009	Comedy Central
14	14	March 17, 2010	November 17, 2010	Comedy Central
15	14	April 27, 2011	November 16, 2011	Comedy Central
16	14	March 14, 2012	November 7, 2012	Comedy Central
17	10	September 25, 2013	December 11, 2013	Comedy Central
18	10	September 24, 2014	December 10, 2014	Comedy Central
19	10	September 16, 2015	December 9, 2015	Comedy Central
20	10	September 14, 2016	December 7, 2016	Comedy Central
21	10	September 13, 2017	December 6, 2017	Comedy Central
22	10	September 26, 2018	December 12, 2018	Comedy Central
23	10	September 25, 2019	December 11, 2019	Comedy Central
24	2	September 30, 2020	March 10, 2021	Comedy Central
Specials	2	November 25, 2021	December 16, 2021	Paramount+
25	6	February 2, 2022	March 16, 2022	Comedy Central
Specials	2	June 1, 2022	July 13, 2022	Paramount+
26	6	February 8, 2023	March 29, 2023	Comedy Central
Specials	3	October 27, 2023	May 24, 2024	Paramount+
27	5	July 23, 2025	September 24, 2025	Comedy Central
28	5	October 15, 2025	December 10, 2025	Comedy Central
29	6	September 16, 2026	November 25, 2026	Comedy Central

== Distribution ==
=== International ===
South Park is broadcast internationally in several countries and territories, including India, New Zealand, and several countries throughout Europe and Latin America on channels that are subsidiaries of Comedy Central and Paramount Media Networks, both subsidiaries of Paramount. In distribution deals with Comedy Central, other independent networks also broadcast the series in other international markets.

In Australia, the show is broadcast on The Comedy Channel, Comedy Central and free-to-air channel SBS Viceland (before 2009), while new episodes aired on SBS. The program also airs free-to-air in Australia on 10 Shake, a sister network to Comedy Central through Paramount.

In Canada the series was broadcast nationally and over the air on Global for the first 3 seasons. Moving to The Comedy Network for season 4, where it would air uncensored until season 16 and finally moving to Much for season 17 to 26, with season 19 to 22 streaming on the canadian platform Crave at the same time, before streaming on Paramount+ and leaving Canadian broadcast television in 2023.

South Park airs in Irish on TG4 in Ireland, STV in Scotland, Comedy Central and MTV in the UK (previously on Sky One, Channel 4, VIVA and 5Star), B92 in Serbia, and on Game One and NRJ 12 in France. In September 2020, SBS, which aired South Park in Australia since 1997, removed South Park from its television line-up, though reruns could air on SBS Viceland.

=== Syndication ===
Broadcast syndication rights to South Park were acquired by Debmar-Mercury and Tribune Entertainment in 2003 and 2004 respectively. Episodes further edited for content began running in syndication on September 19, 2005, and were aired in the United States with the TV-14 rating. 20th Television replaced Tribune as co-distributor in early 2008. By the time its run in syndication ended in 2015, it aired in 90 percent of the television markets across the United States and Canada, where it generated an estimated US$25 million a year in advertising revenue. In 2019, CBS Television Distribution (the syndication arm of ViacomCBS, now known as Paramount Skydance), took over the full distribution rights following the acquisition of 21st Century Fox (parent of 20th Television) by The Walt Disney Company (who had employed Debmar-Mercury founder Mort Marcus as the head of their syndication division), distributing the show in syndication. In 2021, South Park Studios struck a deal with ViacomCBS, which allows the show to be renewed all the way up to season 30 and 14 additional films, enough to carry the show to at least 2027.

=== Home media ===
Complete seasons of South Park have been regularly released in their entirety on DVD since 2002, with season twenty-six being the most recently released. Several other themed DVD compilations have been released by Rhino Entertainment and Comedy Central, while the three-episode Imaginationland story arc was reissued straight-to-DVD as a full-length feature in 2008. Blu-ray releases started in 2008 with the release of season twelve. Subsequent seasons have been released in this format alongside the longer-running DVD releases. The first eleven seasons were released on Blu-ray for the first time in December 2017.

=== Streaming ===
In March 2008, Comedy Central made every episode of South Park available for free full-length on-demand legal streaming on the official South Park Studios website. From March 2008 until December 2013, new episodes were added to the site the day following their debut, and an uncensored version was posted the following day. The episode stayed up for the remainder of the week, then taken down, and added to the site three weeks later.

Within a week, the site served more than a million streams of full episodes, and the number grew to 55 million by October 2008. Legal issues prevent the U.S. content from being accessible outside the United States, so local servers have been set up in other countries. In September 2009, a South Park Studios website with streaming episodes was launched in the United Kingdom and Ireland. In Canada, episodes were available for streaming from The Comedy Network's website, though due to digital rights restrictions, they are no longer available.

In April 2010, the season five episode "Super Best Friends" and the season fourteen episodes "200" and "201" were removed from the site; additionally, these episodes no longer air in reruns and are only available exclusively on DVD and Blu-ray. These episodes remain unavailable following the 2014 purchase by Hulu.

In July 2014, it was announced that Hulu had signed a three-year deal purchasing exclusive online streaming rights to South Park for a reported $80 million. Following the announcement every episode remained available for free on the South Park Studios website, using the Hulu player. As of September 2014, following the premiere of the eighteenth season, only 30 select episodes would be featured for free viewing at a time on a rotating basis on the website, with new episodes being available for an entire month starting the day following their original airings. The entire series was available on Hulu by this point.

As of July 2015, all episodes of South Park are available for streaming in Canada on the service CraveTV, which first consisted of seasons 1–18. Subsequent seasons were released the following July.

In early October 2019, industry rumors suggested that the streaming rights for South Park were being offered to various services, creating an intense bidding war that was estimated to be as high as US$500 million. HBO and South Park Digital Studios announced that HBO had secured a multi-year deal for the exclusive streaming rights for South Park on their HBO Max service starting June 24, 2020. While the terms of the deal were not disclosed, Variety reported the deal fell between US$500 million and US$550 million. Beginning with season 25 in 2022, HBO Max posts new episodes the next day after their Comedy Central airing. Once that deal expires in 2025, Paramount+ will become the exclusive streaming home. In addition, the season 27 episodes would stream first on Paramount+ before hitting HBO Max. Though season 27 would have originally aired in 2024, the season was delayed due to what Parker and Stone claimed to be uncertainties about the 2024 United States presidential election (mainly the exhaustion of humor set around Donald Trump), along with the merger of Skydance Media and Paramount Global.

In February 2023, Warner Bros. Discovery filed a lawsuit which claimed that Paramount breached its exclusivity contract with HBO Max by airing South Park on its own streaming platform.

=== Re-rendered episodes ===
From its debut in 1997 to the season twelve finale in 2008 the series had been originally produced in standard definition, with a 4:3 aspect ratio. In 2009, the series switched to being produced in 16:9 high definition 1080p with the beginning of the thirteenth season. All twelve seasons originally produced in standard definition have been remastered by South Park Studios, being fully re-rendered in high definition. The aspect ratio of these episodes was converted from 4:3 to 16:9 as well. The re-rendered versions were also released on Blu-ray. Several of the re-rendered episodes from the earlier seasons have their original uncensored audio tracks; they had previously been released in censored form. The series premiere, "Cartman Gets an Anal Probe", is the only episode that was animated using cut-out animation. As a result, it retains its original 4:3 aspect ratio, while all other episodes in Season 1 were re-rendered in 16:9 widescreen. When the South Park team first started using Alia PowerAnimator, they scanned all the available frames into a high-quality version of the episode, for the purpose of reusing the character textures of the first episode as a base for subsequent episodes. Later, during the re-rendering process, they made minor adjustments to the scanned frames to correct errors, including recreating missing frames.

The fifth-season episode "Super Best Friends", which was pulled from syndication and online streams following the controversy surrounding episode "201", was not released alongside the rest of the season when it was released in HD on iTunes in 2011. The episode was later re-rendered and made available for the Blu-ray release of the season that was released on December 5, 2017. The episode is presented in its original presentation, without Muhammad's image being obscured as in later episodes of the series.

== Reception ==
=== Ratings ===
When South Park debuted, it was a huge ratings success for Comedy Central and is seen as being largely responsible for the success of the channel, with Herzog crediting it for putting the network "on the map".

The show's first episode, "Cartman Gets an Anal Probe", earned a Nielsen rating of 1.3 (980,000 viewers), at the time considered high for a cable program. The show instantly generated buzz among television viewers, and mass viewing parties began assembling on college campuses. By the time the eighth episode, "Starvin' Marvin", aired—three months after the show debuted—ratings and viewership had tripled, and South Park was already the most successful show in Comedy Central's history. When the tenth episode "Damien" aired the following February, viewership increased another 33 percent. The episode earned a 6.4 rating, which at the time was over 10 times the average rating earned by a cable show aired in prime time. The ratings peaked with the second episode of season two, "Cartman's Mom Is Still a Dirty Slut", which aired on April 22, 1998. The episode earned an 8.2 rating (6.2 million viewers) and, at the time, set a record as the highest-rated non-sports show in basic cable history. During the spring of 1998, eight of the ten highest-rated shows on basic cable were South Park episodes. South Park's second season would average a 5.8 rating (12.5 million viewers) which was a lower rating due to Comedy Central's households being much higher.

The success of South Park prompted more cable companies to carry Comedy Central and led to it becoming one of the fastest-growing cable channels. The number of households that had Comedy Central jumped from 9.1 million in 1997 to 50 million in June 1998. When the show debuted, the most Comedy Central had earned for a 30-second commercial was US$7,500. Within a year, advertisers were paying an average of US$40,000 for 30 seconds of advertising time during airings of South Park in its second season, while some paid as much as US$80,000.

By the third season (1999), the series' ratings began to decrease. The third-season premiere episode drew 3.4 million viewers, a dramatic drop from the 5.5 million of the previous season's premiere. Stone and Parker attributed this drop in the show's ratings to the media hype that surrounded the show in the previous year, adding that the third season ratings reflected the show's "true" fan base. Regardless the viewership stayed consistent with an average rating being between 3.0 (8 million viewers) to a 5.5 (17.5 million viewers). The show's ratings dropped further in its fourth season (2000), with episodes averaging just above 1.5 million viewers (though the season premiere would get 22.1 million viewers due to the hype caused by the movie). The ratings eventually increased, and seasons five through nine consistently averaged about 3 million viewers per episode. Season 8's episode "Goobacks" would have South Park's viewership peak at 30 million viewers. Seasons 10 to 12 would average 5 million viewers. Though its viewership is lower than it was at the height of its popularity in its earliest seasons, South Park remains one of the highest-rated series on Comedy Central. The season 14 (2010) premiere gained 3.7 million viewers, the show's highest-rated season premiere since 1998. In 2016, a New York Times study of the 50 TV shows with the most Facebook Likes found that "perhaps unsurprisingly, South Park ... is most popular in Colorado". Subsequent seasons saw substantially lower ratings, though after taking on Donald Trump directly in season 27, ratings jumped to over 6.2 million viewers cross-platform, the show's highest since 2018.

=== Recognitions and awards ===
In 2004, Channel 4 voted South Park the third-greatest cartoon of all time. In 2007, Time magazine included the show on its list of the "100 Best TV Shows of All Time", proclaiming it as "America's best source of rapid-fire satire for [the past] decade". The same year, Rolling Stone declared it to be the funniest show on television since its debut 10 years prior. In 2008, South Park was named the 12th-greatest TV show of the past 25 years by Entertainment Weekly, while AOL declared it as having the "most astute" characters of any show in history when naming it the 16th-best television comedy series of all time. In 2011, South Park was voted number one in the 25 Greatest Animated TV Series poll by Entertainment Weekly. The character of Cartman ranked 10th on TV Guide's 2002 list of the "Top 50 Greatest Cartoon Characters", 198th on VH1's "200 Greatest Pop Culture Icons", 19th on Bravo's "100 Greatest TV Characters" television special in 2004, and second on MSNBC's 2005 list of TV's scariest characters behind Mr. Burns from The Simpsons. In 2006, Comedy Central received a Peabody Award for South Park's "stringent social commentary" and "undeniably fearless lampooning of all that is self-important and hypocritical in American life". In 2013, the Writers Guild of America ranked South Park at number 63 among the "101 Best-Written Shows Ever". Also in 2013, TV Guide listed the show at number 10 among the "60 Greatest Cartoons of All Time". In 2019, the series was ranked 42nd on The Guardian newspaper's list of the 100 best TV shows of the 21st century.

South Park won the CableACE Award for Best Animated Series in 1997, the last year the awards were given out. In 1998, South Park was nominated for the Annie Award for Outstanding Achievement in an Animated Primetime or Late Night Television Program. It was also nominated for the 1998 GLAAD Award for Outstanding TV – Individual Episode for "Big Gay Al's Big Gay Boat Ride".

South Park has been nominated for the Emmy Award for Outstanding Animated Program eighteen times (1998, 2000, 2002, 2004–2011, 2013–2018 and 2021). The show has won the award for Outstanding Animated Program (For Programming Less Than One Hour) four times, for the 2005 episode "Best Friends Forever", the 2006 episode "Make Love, Not Warcraft", the 2009 episode "Margaritaville", the 2012 episode "Raising the Bar", and the 2025 episode "Sermon on The 'Mount". The "Imaginationland" trilogy of episodes won the Emmy Award for Outstanding Animated Program (For Programming One Hour or More) in 2008. It was also nominated twice for the Emmy Award for Outstanding Voice-Over Performance for the 68th Emmy Awards.

=== Criticism ===
The show's frequent depiction of taboo subject matter, general toilet humor, accessibility to younger viewers, disregard for conservative sensibilities, negative depiction of liberal causes, and portrayal of religion for comic effect have generated controversy and debate over the course of its run.

As the series became popular, students in two schools were barred from wearing South Park-related T-shirts, and the headmaster of a UK public school asked parents not to let their children watch the programme after eight- and nine-year-old children voted the South Park character Cartman as their favorite personality in a 1999 poll. Parker and Stone assert that the show is not meant to be viewed by young children, and the show is certified with TV ratings that indicate its intention for mature audiences. In 1999, they went on record to cancel the release of the Game Boy Color game based on the series, as Parker and Stone determined that a game based on an adult animated series would be inappropriate for a console whose core demographic consisted of children.

Parents Television Council founder L. Brent Bozell III and Action for Children's Television founder Peggy Charren have both condemned the show, with the latter claiming it is "dangerous to the democracy". Several other activist groups have protested the show's parodies of Christianity and portrayal of Jesus Christ. Stone has stated that parents who disapprove of South Park for its portrayal of how kids behave are upset because they "have an idyllic vision of what kids are like", adding "[kids] don't have any kind of social tact or etiquette, they're just complete little raging bastards".

==== Controversies ====
The show further lampooned the controversy surrounding its use of profanity, as well as the media attention surrounding the network show Chicago Hope's singular use of the word shit, with the season five premiere "It Hits the Fan", in which the word shit is said 162 times without being bleeped for censorship purposes, while also appearing uncensored in written form. In the days following the show's original airing, 5,000 disapproving e-mails were sent to Comedy Central. Despite its 43 uncensored uses of the racial slur nigger, the season 11 episode "With Apologies to Jesse Jackson" generated relatively little controversy, as most in the black community and the NAACP praised the episode for its context and its comedic way of conveying other races' perceptions of how black people feel when hearing the word.

Specific controversies regarding the show have included an April Fools' Day prank played on its viewers in 1998, its depiction of the Virgin Mary in the season nine (2005) finale "Bloody Mary" that angered several Catholics, its depiction of Steve Irwin with a stingray barb stuck in his chest in the episode "Hell on Earth 2006", which originally aired less than two months after Irwin was killed in the same fashion, Comedy Central's censorship of the depiction of Muhammad in the season 10 episode "Cartoon Wars Part II" in the wake of the Jyllands-Posten Muhammad cartoons controversy and consistent mockery of the concept of climate change by using climate change denialist talking points.

The season nine (2005) episode "Trapped in the Closet" denounces Scientology as nothing more than "a big fat global scam", while freely divulging church information that Scientology normally only reveals to members who make significant monetary contributions to the church. The episode also ambiguously parodies the rumors involving the sexual orientation of Scientologist Tom Cruise, who allegedly demanded any further reruns of the episode be canceled. Isaac Hayes, a Scientologist, ostensibly quit South Park because of his objection to the episode.

The season fourteen episodes "200" and "201" were mired in controversy for satirizing issues surrounding the depiction of the Islamic prophet, Muhammad. The website for the organization Revolution Muslim, a New York-based radical Muslim organization, posted an entry that included a warning to creators Parker and Stone that they risk violent retribution for their depictions of Muhammad. It said that they "will probably wind up like Theo van Gogh for airing this show". The posting provided the addresses to Comedy Central in New York and the production company in Los Angeles. The author of the post, Zachary Adam Chesser (whose alias is Abu Talhah al-Amrikee), said it was meant to serve as a warning to Parker and Stone, not a threat, and that providing the addresses was meant to give people the opportunity to protest.

Despite Chesser's claims that the website entry was a warning, several media outlets and observers interpreted it as a threat. Comedy Central censored the episode's broadcast in response, by bleeping out several speeches and covering Mohammed's appearances with a giant "censored" label. Support for the episode has come in the form of Everybody Draw Mohammed Day, a movement started on Facebook that encourages people to draw Muhammad on May 20. The "200" episode, which also depicted the Buddha snorting cocaine, prompted the government of Sri Lanka to ban the series outright.

Due to many taboo topics in China—such as Dalai Lama, Winnie the Pooh, labor camps, freedom of speech and cannabis culture—being involved in the season 23 (2019) episode "Band in China", South Park was entirely banned in China after the episode's broadcast. The series' Baidu Baike article, Baidu Tieba forum, Douban page, Zhihu page and Bilibili videos have been deleted or made inaccessible to the public, all related keywords and topics have been prohibited from being searched and discussed on China-based search engines and social media sites including Baidu, QQ, Weibo and on WeChat public platforms. Parker and Stone issued a sarcastic apology in response.

== Legacy ==
=== Cultural ===
Commentary made in episodes has been interpreted as statements Parker and Stone are attempting to make to the viewing public, and these opinions have been subject to much critical analysis in the media and literary world within the framework of popular philosophical, theological, social, and political concepts. Since South Park debuted, college students have written term papers and doctoral theses analyzing the show, while Brooklyn College offers a course called "South Park and Political Correctness".

Soon after one of Kenny's trademark deaths on the show, other characters would typically shout "Oh my God, they killed Kenny!", followed by another yelling out "You bastard(s)!"—these lines were usually said by the characters Stan and Kyle, respectively. The exclamation quickly became a popular catchphrase, while the running gag of Kenny's recurring deaths is one of the more recognized hallmarks among viewers of modern television. Cartman's exclamations of "Respect my authori-tah!" and "Screw you guys ...I'm going home!" became catchphrases as well, and during the show's earlier seasons, were highly popular in the lexicon of viewers. Cartman's eccentric intonation of "Hey!" was included in the 2002 edition of The Oxford Dictionary of Catchphrases.

In the season two episode "Chef Aid", attorney Johnnie Cochran uses what's called in the show the Chewbacca defense, which is a legal strategy that involves addressing plot holes related to Chewbacca in the film Return of the Jedi rather than discussing the trial at hand during a closing argument in a deliberate attempt to confuse jurors into thinking there is reasonable doubt. The term "Chewbacca defense" has been documented as being used by criminologists, forensic scientists, and political commentators in their various discussions of similar methods used in legal cases and public forums.

Another season two episode, "Gnomes", revolves around a group of "underpants gnomes" who, as their name suggests, run a corporation stealing people's underpants. When asked about their business model, various gnomes reply that theirs is a three-step process: Phase 1 is "collect underpants". Phase 3 is "profit". However, the gnomes are unable to explain what is to occur between the first and final steps, and "Phase 2" is accompanied by a large question mark on their corporate flow chart. Using "????" and "PROFIT!" as the last two steps in a process (usually jokingly) became a widely popular Internet meme because of this. Especially in the context of politics and economics, "underpants gnomes" has been used by some commentators to characterize a conspicuous gap of logic or planning.

When Sophie Rutschmann of the University of Strasbourg discovered a mutated gene that causes an adult fruit fly to die within two days after it is infected with certain bacteria, she named the gene kep1 in honor of Kenny. Similarly, when a mutated ortholog of KIAA1109 was also found for said species that inhibited their ability to stand upright, walk, and caused seizures, indicative of severe neurological defects, a different set of researchers named it Tweek in honor of Tweek.

=== Political ===
While some conservatives have condemned South Park for its vulgarity, a growing population of people who hold center-right political beliefs, including teenagers and young adults, have embraced the show for its tendency to mock liberal viewpoints and lampoon liberal celebrities and icons. Political commentator Andrew Sullivan dubbed the group South Park Republicans, or South Park conservatives. Sullivan averred that members of the group are "extremely skeptical of political correctness but also are socially liberal on many issues", though he says the phrase applied to them is meant to be more of a casual indication of beliefs than a strong partisan label. Brian C. Anderson describes the group as "generally characterized by holding strong libertarian beliefs and rejecting more conservative social policy", and notes that although the show makes "wicked fun of conservatives", it is "at the forefront of a conservative revolt against liberal media" and Hollywood's "liberal hegemony".

Parker and Stone reject the idea that the show has any underlying political position, and deny having a political agenda when creating an episode. The two claim the show's higher proportion of instances lampooning liberal rather than conservative orthodoxies stems simply from their preference for making fun of liberals. While Stone has been quoted saying, "I hate conservatives, but I really fucking hate liberals", Stone and Parker have explained that their drive to lampoon a given target comes first from the target's insistence on telling other people how to behave. The duo explain that they regard liberals as having both delusions of entitlement to remain free from satire, and a propensity to enforce political correctness while patronizing the citizens of Middle America. Parker and Stone are uncomfortable with the idea of themselves or South Park being assigned any kind of partisan classification. Parker said he rejects the "South Park Republican" and "South Park conservative" labels, feeling that either tag implies that one only adheres to strictly conservative or liberal viewpoints. The duo has in the past reluctantly labeled themselves libertarians and fans of government gridlock. In 2006, they said that they were "rooting for Hillary Clinton in 2008 simply because it would be weird to have her as president".

For season 29, Trey Parker rebranded the show to "South America" as a shot to United States President Donald Trump's controversial renaming of Lake Ontario to "Lake America" for U.S. federal agencies.

== See also ==
- South Park (Park County, Colorado)
- South Park City
- South Park Conservatives
