= Chef's Chocolate Salty Balls =

- South Park episode
- Episode no.: Season 2 Episode 9
- Directed by: Trey Parker
- Written by: Trey Parker; Matt Stone; Nancy M. Pimental
- Production code: 209
- Original air date: August 19, 1998

Episode chronology
← Previous "Summer Sucks"	Next → "Chickenpox"
- South Park season 2

"Chef's Chocolate Salty Balls" is the ninth episode of the second season of the American animated television series South Park. The 22nd episode of the series overall, it originally aired on Comedy Central in the United States on August 19, 1998. The episode was written by series co-creators Trey Parker and Matt Stone, along with Nancy M. Pimental, and directed by Parker.

In the episode, the Sundance Film Festival is moved to South Park, but it badly affects Mr. Hankey. Meanwhile, Chef tries his luck to make some money, as many visitors come to the town, by selling his new sweet treats - his titular chocolate salty balls.

== Plot ==
Park City, Utah is in the midst of the Sundance Film Festival. Sundance's founder, Robert Redford, has decided that Park City has become too commercialized by the annual migration of the Hollywood jet set, so he decides to move the festival to South Park, Colorado. The Sundance Festival relocates to South Park, which is immediately deluged by Hollywood tourists. In school, Mr. Garrison gives the students an assignment to see one independent film during the festival and write a report on it. Cartman dismisses independent films as "black-and-white hippie movies...about gay cowboys eating pudding"; Stan, however, sees this as an opportunity to go on a date with Wendy. In the meantime, Chef sets up a sales stand at the festival for his fudge cookie recipes.

At night, as Kyle uses the restroom, he hears Mr. Hankey, the Christmas Poo calling to him from the toilet. Kyle persuades Stan, Cartman, and Kenny to help him find Mr. Hankey; they enter the sewer system to look for him. They soon find Mr. Hankey, who tells Kyle that the influx of all the Hollywood tourists, with their health-food diets, has disrupted the ecosystem of the sewer, which has made him deathly ill.

Kyle and the others appear before a film's showing, and Kyle pleads with the Hollywood visitors to understand that their presence is causing the death of his friend Mr. Hankey. However, they all think Kyle is trying to pitch a script, and they offer film deals. One agent approaches Cartman to buy the rights to Kyle's story; he readily agrees. A film is produced overnight, starring Tom Hanks as Kyle and a monkey as Mr. Hankey. The South Park locals are beginning to tire of the festival, seeing that it is causing the town to become overrun with commercialism and Hollywood kitsch. However, Redford plans to sue the whole the town if they go through with ending the festival; he then reveals to his wife, Phyllis, that he will make all small towns overrun with Hollywood culture, since he cannot escape it, so he wants to inflict it on everyone else. By this time, Cartman realizes he's been cheated out by the agent and only receives three dollars from the two million dollars the Mr. Hankey movie made and Stan promptly calls Cartman a sell-out; not to be outdone, Cartman then starts selling shirts of Tom Hanks with the monkey-version of Mr. Hankey.

Kyle tries to show Mr. Hankey to the crowd, but Mr. Hankey is pale and near death. Chef feeds Mr. Hankey one of his Chocolate Salty Balls, causing him to return to life. Stan, Kyle, Chef, and Mr. Hankey approach Redford as he is on a podium to announce the return of the film festival the next year and the many years afterward. After he ignores their pleas to relocate the festival, Mr. Hankey makes a passionate speech about film festivals - instead of catering to the glamor of Hollywood, they should focus more on giving new-coming filmmakers a chance and actually enjoy the films. Infuriated, Redford throws Mr. Hankey against a wall, killing him; Chef revitalizes Mr. Hankey once again with his Chocolate Salty Balls. He then causes the sewers to erupt over South Park, causing Redford and Phyllis' car to fill with feces, drowning them, and all the tourists flee the town. With the town saved (albeit covered in excrement), the boys and Wendy reflect on Mr. Hankey's message and admit that while a few independent films are great, "most of them suck ass." As for Cartman, he feels that being a sell-out was positive for him because he wouldn't hang out with "poor-ass losers" like his friends and leaves with the money he earned selling shirts.

== Production ==
A soundtrack album, titled Chef Aid: The South Park Album, was released in 1998, during the broadcast run of the second season. It comprises songs featured in and related to the series, including "Chocolate Salty Balls", performed by Isaac Hayes as Chef, from this episode.

== Cultural references ==
Cartman refers to independent films as being about "gay cowboys eating pudding". This episode aired seven years before the independent film Brokeback Mountain was released in 2005, but one year after the publication of the short story of the same name by Annie Proulx in 1997. In an interview with the Associated Press in October 2005, series co-creators Trey Parker and Matt Stone responded to questions about the prophetic statement by Cartman. Parker quipped, "...if there’s pudding eating in there, we’re going to sue", and Stone claimed, "No [we're not prophets], but Cartman is. [Laughs] We went to Sundance a lot in the mid-to-late ’90s, and you could just tell it was going toward gay cowboydom."

== Home media ==
All 18 episodes of the second season, including "Chef's Chocolate Salty Balls", were released on a DVD box set on June 3, 2003 by Warner Home Video.
