= Merry Christmas, Charlie Manson! =

- South Park episode
- Episode no.: Season 2 Episode 16
- Directed by: Eric Stough
- Written by: Trey Parker; Nancy M. Pimental
- Production code: 216
- Original air date: December 9, 1998

Guest appearance
- Dian Bachar as the fake Mr. Hankey

Episode chronology
← Previous "Spookyfish"	Next → "Gnomes"
- South Park season 2

"Merry Christmas, Charlie Manson!" is the sixteenth episode of the second season of the American animated television series South Park. The 29th episode of the series overall it originally aired on Comedy Central in the United States on December 9, 1998. The episode was written by series co-creator Trey Parker along with Nancy M. Pimental and was directed by Eric Stough, in his directorial debut in the show and making it the first episode to not be directed by Parker or Stone.

In the episode, the boys go to Cartman's grandma's house in Nebraska for the holidays but Stan was told by his parents that he cannot go because it's far away from South Park. Stan challenges their authority and goes anyway. Meanwhile, Cartman's Uncle Howard and his friend Charlie Manson bust out of prison and cause mayhem and mischief.

== Plot ==
Stan asks his parents for permission to go with Cartman and his friends who are visiting Cartman's grandma in Nebraska for the holidays. However, Sharon refuses because the place is far away from South Park and prefers him to stay with the family for the holidays. Even when she leaves it up to Randy to grant permission, and Randy is okay with it, Sharon still forbids their son to go there and order him to wash up for supper. When Stan complains about his mother's supper, he gets sent to his room without supper. An angry Stan sneaks out to Cartman's grandma's house just in time to join the other boys. During the drive to Nebraska they see a sign for an appearance of Mr. Hankey at a mall. When they finally arrive, Cartman's relatives are there, all of whom share Cartman's mannerisms and are obese. At dinner they meet Cartman's Uncle Howard, live via satellite from the state prison. Later that night the boys hear someone breaking into the house and discover that it is Uncle Howard and another inmate: Charlie Manson.

The boys want to go to the mall to see Mr. Hankey, but no one in the family will take them and Cartman is asked to keep an eye on his cousin, Elvin. Manson offers to take the boys to the mall. Kyle and Stan meet a human-sized Mr. Hankey whom Kyle exposes as a fake, causing a riot. The boys and Manson escape from the mall but when the riot police recognize Manson, they get into a televised high-speed chase with the police. Meanwhile, the Marsh family realizes Stan has run away and head out to Nebraska to find him.

Manson arrives at Cartman's grandma's house and together with Uncle Howard proceeds to hold everyone hostage. Stan's parents arrive and Sharon scolds him for disobeying their order to not go to Cartman's grandma's house in Nebraska and for leaving his house without their permission. Stan asks to make an escape with Uncle Howard and Manson but the latter talks to him about the meaning of family which makes him change his mind. Kenny gets killed by the police when displaying a white flag as surrender. Manson and Uncle Howard release the hostages and surrender to the authorities. Having a change of heart, Manson expresses remorse for his crimes and sings a holiday-special style song. Stan's parents agree that they were unreasonable when denying him a Christmas with his friends and they will punish him after the holidays. Later as Manson goes to sleep in prison, Stan, Kyle and all of the Cartmans appear to sing "Hark! The Herald Angels Sing" to Manson. Afterwards, Stan tells Kyle how messed up the events of the episode were.

== Home media ==
All 18 episodes of the second season, including "Merry Christmas, Charlie Manson!", were released on a DVD box set on June 3, 2003.
