= Clubhouses (South Park) =

- South Park episode
- Episode no.: Season 2 Episode 12
- Directed by: Trey Parker
- Written by: Trey Parker; Nancy M. Pimental
- Production code: 212
- Original air date: September 23, 1998

Episode chronology
← Previous "Roger Ebert Should Lay Off the Fatty Foods"	Next → "Cow Days"
- South Park season 2

"Clubhouses" is the twelfth episode of the second season of the American animated television series South Park. The 25th episode of the series overall, it originally aired on Comedy Central in the United States on September 23, 1998. The episode was written by series co-creator Trey Parker, along with Nancy M. Pimental, and directed by Parker. In the episode, the boys set out to build clubhouses so they can play Truth or Dare with girls, while Randy and Sharon Marsh's marriage begins to fall apart.

== Plot ==
Stan convinces Kyle to set out and build a clubhouse so they can play Truth or Dare with Wendy and Bebe. Stan believes he will be dared to kiss his girlfriend, Wendy, and Bebe, who has developed a crush on the unsuspecting Kyle, plans to make him her boyfriend. Kyle doesn't want to play Truth or Dare with the girls, but Stan alleviates his worries by saying they could get them to eat gross bugs via dare. Cartman and Kenny learn of Stan and Kyle's plans and set about building their own clubhouse; however, Cartman slacks off while having Kenny do all the work. Stan seeks advice from Chef on how to play Truth or Dare since neither he or Kyle know the rules - Chef tells Stan to do truth for a little bit before the dare or else he would come off as too eager, and when it comes to the dare he should say it sensually so that Wendy could possibly kiss him.

Meanwhile, Stan's parents, Randy and Sharon, divorce due to constant bickering. Sharon soon introduces Stan to a new stepfather, Roy, who promptly moves into the family home and whines a lot to Stan and making him do chores. Cartman and Kenny complete their clubhouse first, and Kenny manages to get two 16-year-old girls to hang out with them. Cartman attempts to get the girls to play Truth or Dare, but this fails when one of the girls says that Truth or Dare is for children. They instead instigate a massive party in the clubhouse, during which Kenny is inadvertently crushed during a mosh pit. Stan and Kyle eventually finish their clubhouse, despite not using nails since Sharon was worried they would get hurt. Before Stan can invite Wendy and Bebe, it is time for him to visit his father. Randy displays insincere interest and is more focused on enjoying single life (he is later seen at Cartman and Kenny's party in their clubhouse). The girls later visit Stan and Kyle's clubhouse to play Truth or Dare. Kyle and Bebe end up kissing after Kyle fails to listen to Stan's advice from Chef and makes a dare, causing him to run out of the clubhouse in disgust. Next is Stan, who is tempted to kiss Wendy and ignores Chef's advice to ask for a dare. However, Roy interrupts, causing Wendy and Bebe to leave early; Stan plans to enact vengeance on his stepfather.

Randy and Sharon get back together as Stan sets them up for a meeting in his clubhouse; he also sets up a bear trap for Roy after watching a cartoon on TV and he is left dangling from a tree while Randy and Sharon make up and have sex in the clubhouse. The next day, Stan and Clyde, who has become Bebe's boyfriend immediately after breaking up with Kyle (who was still unaware of her feelings for him), play Truth or Dare with Wendy and Bebe. Stan - once again ignoring Chef's advice - asks for a dare, expecting to be asked to kiss Wendy, but is instead told to insert a stick in his urethra ("jam it" up his "peehole"); Stan is left in shock. The episode ends with Roy still trapped up in the tree while asking for Sharon.

== Cultural references ==
The Fat Abbott Show is a parody of Fat Albert and the Cosby Kids.

One of the teenage girls Cartman invites to his clubhouse is wearing a shirt with "D.V.D.A." (Double Vaginal Double Anal) printed on it, a reference to Stone and Parker's comedy band.

== Home media ==
All 18 episodes of the second season, including "Clubhouses", were released on a DVD box set on June 3, 2003.
