= City on the Edge of Forever (South Park) =

- South Park episode
- Screenshot from the episode. In the episode's plot, all of the kids are trapped on their school bus, which is stuck on the edge of a cliff.
- Episode no.: Season 2 Episode 7
- Directed by: Trey Parker
- Written by: Trey Parker; Nancy M. Pimental
- Production code: 207
- Original air date: June 17, 1998

Guest appearances
- Henry Winkler as the Kid-Eating Monster; Jay Leno as himself; Brent Musburger as Scuzzlebutt's leg

Episode chronology
| ← Previous "The Mexican Staring Frog of Southern Sri Lanka" | Next → "Summer Sucks" |
- South Park season 2

"City on the Edge of Forever" (also known as "Flashbacks") is the seventh episode of the second season of the American animated television series South Park. The 20th episode of the series overall, it originally aired on Comedy Central in the United States on June 17, 1998. The episode was written by series co-creator Trey Parker, along with Nancy M. Pimental, and directed by Parker. It guest stars Henry Winkler, Jay Leno, and Brent Musburger. In the episode, the boys reminisce about past experiences as their school bus is left teetering on the edge of a cliff. Ms. Crabtree leaves to seek help, but forgets about the children when she meets a truck driver named Marcus, and pursues a career as a stand-up comedian.

== Plot ==
The children are on the bus, following a diversion along a mountain pass. When Ms. Crabtree gets distracted by the kids, the bus veers off the road and nearly goes over a cliff. She leaves to seek help, telling the kids not to leave the bus, because "a big scary monster" will eat them. The kids remain there and remember past experiences (featuring clips from previous episodes), but the memory of what happened is distorted: for example, they all usually end with everyone enjoying ice cream (as noted by new animated sequences), or if Stan and Wendy are both present, the two making out without the former puking on the latter. When a student wearing a red shirt tries to leave the bus, a gigantic black monster kills him before disappearing; later on, the black monster returns and kills Kenny.

Meanwhile, Ms. Crabtree meets a truckdriver named Marcus. He takes her to a club where Carrot Top is performing and Ms. Crabtree insults and yells at him, which appeals to the audience. Marcus takes her to an agent, who finds her funny and hires her as a comedian. By now, she has forgotten about rescuing the stranded children. She soon quits, but she and Marcus remain close. Back in South Park, Mr. Mackey convinces the parents that their children have run away, so they write a song and perform it on television. The children see this on a TV in the bus and are embarrassed.

An argument in which Kyle corrects Cartman's past experience causes the bus to go over the cliff; it lands in a gigantic tub of ice cream. Cartman suddenly realizes how little sense everything makes and wakes up in his own bed. As he explains his dream to his mother, she offers him beetles for breakfast and ice cream as well. Stan wakes up in his bed, and calls Kyle to tell him about the dream. Ms. Crabtree and Marcus are shown sitting on a log near Stark's Pond – Marcus explains that this is all a kid's dream, but Ms. Crabtree says she just wants to enjoy the moment a little longer.

== Cultural references ==
The title of the episode references "The City on the Edge of Forever", the title of a 1967 episode of Star Trek: The Original Series. Several aspects of the episode itself also parody Star Trek.

The 1997 action film Con Air is referenced when Ms. Crabtree holds up a (live) bunny and threatens to shoot it if the children would not be quiet.

One of the children's flashbacks features Fonzie from Happy Days jumping over a series of garbage cans, referencing the Season 3 two-part episode "Fearless Fonzarelli".

One of the missing posters featured Macaulay Culkin, possibly as a reference to the first two Home Alone films.

The song and video of the children's parents singing is a parody of the renowned "We Are the World" song.
