= Prehistoric Ice Man =

- South Park episode
- Episode no.: Season 2 Episode 18
- Directed by: Eric Stough
- Written by: Trey Parker; Nancy M. Pimental
- Production code: 218
- Original air date: January 20, 1999

Episode chronology
← Previous "Gnomes"	Next → "Rainforest Shmainforest"
- South Park season 2

"Prehistoric Ice Man" is the eighteenth and final episode of the second season of the American animated television series South Park. The 31st episode of the series overall, it originally aired on Comedy Central in the United States on January 20, 1999. The episode was written by series co-creator Trey Parker, along with Nancy M. Pimental, and directed by Eric Stough. In the episode, Stan and Kyle find a man who has been frozen in ice since 1996. The episode is a parody of the television series The Crocodile Hunter and its host, Steve Irwin.

== Plot ==
Stan, Kyle, Cartman, and Kenny are inspired to go hunting for crocodiles by watching a Steve Irwin television program in which Irwin is depicted as having a predilection for placing his thumb up an animal's rectum. Cartman causes Kyle to fall into a cave and sends Stan to retrieve him; once in the cave, Stan and Kyle discover a man frozen in ice. The boys retrieve him and take him to Dr. Mephesto to be dissected. Stan and Kyle get into a fight about who really discovered the frozen man and what name they should give him. Dr. Mephesto thaws the ice covering the man and discovers that he is alive and was frozen for only 32 months (according to his clothing brand/style). Despite this, Mephesto and all adults treat him as a prehistoric man and appear to be unable to understand him even though he speaks perfect English. To make his research more lucrative, Mephesto is persuaded by FBI agents to display the man to the public (Kenny is killed when he gets caught under the moving walkway).

Stan and Kyle become upset at the ice man's inhumane treatment, so they decide to set him free. Upon being released, the man (named Larry) returns to his home, only to discover that his wife Leslie has remarried and had two children. Later, as he attempts to refreeze himself, Kyle comes up with a solution for Larry—he takes a train to Des Moines, Iowa since everything there is still like 1996. Dr. Mephesto, Cartman, and the FBI, who have hired Steve Irwin as a tracker, catch up with Larry at the train station, just as he boards a train to Iowa. Irwin wrestles Larry, but the train crashes into a helicopter, killing Irwin as he gets sliced up by the helicopter's propellers. Larry escapes in the helicopter, thanks Stan and Kyle, and heads to Iowa. The FBI agents leave, disappointed as their plan to take over Sweden using Larry failed (much to Dr. Mephesto's confusion). Kyle and Stan decide to bury the hatchet while Cartman—now acting like Steve Irwin —gets his body inadvertently stuck in a cow's rectum.

== Production ==
Australian Outback Guy is a parody of the television series The Crocodile Hunter, and its host, Steve Irwin.

== Home media ==
All 18 episodes of the second season, including "Prehistoric Ice Man", were released on a DVD box set on June 3, 2003.
