= Damien (South Park) =

- South Park episode
- Episode no.: Season 1 Episode 10
- Directed by: Trey Parker
- Written by: Trey Parker; Matt Stone; Dave Polsky (additional written material)
- Production code: 108
- Original air date: February 4, 1998

Guest appearance
- Michael Buffer as himself

Episode chronology
← Previous "Mr. Hankey, the Christmas Poo"	Next → "Tom's Rhinoplasty"
- South Park season 1

"Damien" is the tenth episode of the first season of the American animated television series South Park. It originally aired on Comedy Central in the United States on February 4, 1998. In the episode, the boys' class is joined by a new student named Damien, who has been sent by his father Satan to find Jesus and arrange a boxing match between the two. The majority of South Park's residents bet on Satan to win the match due to his enormous size and muscular physique, but Satan ultimately throws the fight and reveals he bet on Jesus, thus winning everybody's money.

The episode was written by series co-creators Trey Parker and Matt Stone, with additional dialogue by Dave Polsky, and directed by Parker. The episode serves as a satire on religion, faith and the nature of good and evil, as well as a commentary on commercialism, the cult of celebrity in America and the nature of children. It was originally conceptualized as a Christmas special, but the original broadcast was pushed forward when Parker and Stone decided instead to make "Mr. Hankey, the Christmas Poo" the season's holiday episode.

"Damien" received generally positive reviews and was watched by 5.55 million viewers when it was first broadcast, making it the highest rated cable program the week it aired. The episode marked the first appearance of Satan, who would become a recurring South Park character, as well as the character of Damien himself, who was inspired by the antagonist of the 1976 horror film The Omen. Parker and Stone also said the episode introduced several key characteristics of the character Eric Cartman that have endured throughout the rest of the series. Michael Buffer, a boxing ring announcer known for the catchphrase "Let's get ready to rumble!", makes a guest appearance as himself.

== Plot ==
Eric Cartman is excited about his upcoming birthday party and lets everyone invited know what present he expects to receive from each, besides Pip Pirrup, who is not invited due to Cartman "shoving his invitation up his ass". When they protest, he threatens to ban them from eating the food his mother makes, something that immediately convinces them. They encounter a new student named Damien, son of Satan, who threw Cartman's desk through the window. The other boys mock him and, in response, Damien turns Kenny McCormick into a duck-billed platypus, then later sets the playground on fire. Damien informs Jesus that Satan will rise for a final battle with him of good versus evil. South Park residents immediately begin making bets on the fight. Cartman is angered to learn the event is scheduled for the same time as his party, and the children struggle to choose between the two events.

The entire town bets on Jesus to win the fight, but begin to lose faith when Satan appears for the weigh-in. He is huge and weighs a little over 320 pounds (150 kg), while Jesus weighs a mere 135 pounds (61 kg), and the citizens of South Park begin changing their bets. Jesus confronts the South Park residents about their changed betting slips after learning only one person is still betting on Jesus to win. Distraught, Jesus asks Stan Marsh, Kyle Broflovski and Chef to help him train. Damien gets counseling from Mr. Mackey, who recommends he just try being nice no matter what the other kids do, just like with unpopular British child Pip. Damien tries to apologize to the boys for setting fire to the playground and turning Kenny into a duck-billed platypus, stating that he was "doing his father's bidding" and he did not have a choice. The boys, however, still continue to act negatively towards Damien. Cartman's birthday party begins, as does the fight. Damien and Pip arrive uninvited to the party, but the kids finally accept Damien after he hurls Pip in the air and makes him explode in a shower of fireworks. However, an enraged Cartman ends his party early after opening Kyle's present to discover that it's not what he had in mind.

Meanwhile, Jesus is disheartened by the town's lack of faith in him, and he does not retaliate to Satan's attacks against him, despite Satan's apparent taunting of "hit me". Chef and the kids make it for the end of the fight and offer Jesus some words of encouragement. Inspired, Jesus finally throws a single weak punch. However, Satan then takes a dive and goes down for the count. Afterward, Satan reveals that his plan had, in fact, been to bet on Jesus and then throw the fight, winning him a lot of money and real estate from the South Park residents. The townspeople are upset by this, until Stan reminds them that Jesus told them not to bet on Satan. The whole town then asks forgiveness of Jesus, who accepts the apology. Kenny dies when Jimbo Kern identifies him as a rare duck-billed platypus and shoots him. Damien bids goodbye to Stan and Kyle since his dad "is always on the move" he has to leave. Meanwhile, Cartman has continued his party even after kicking everyone out and has eaten all the food himself.

== Production ==
=== Origins ===
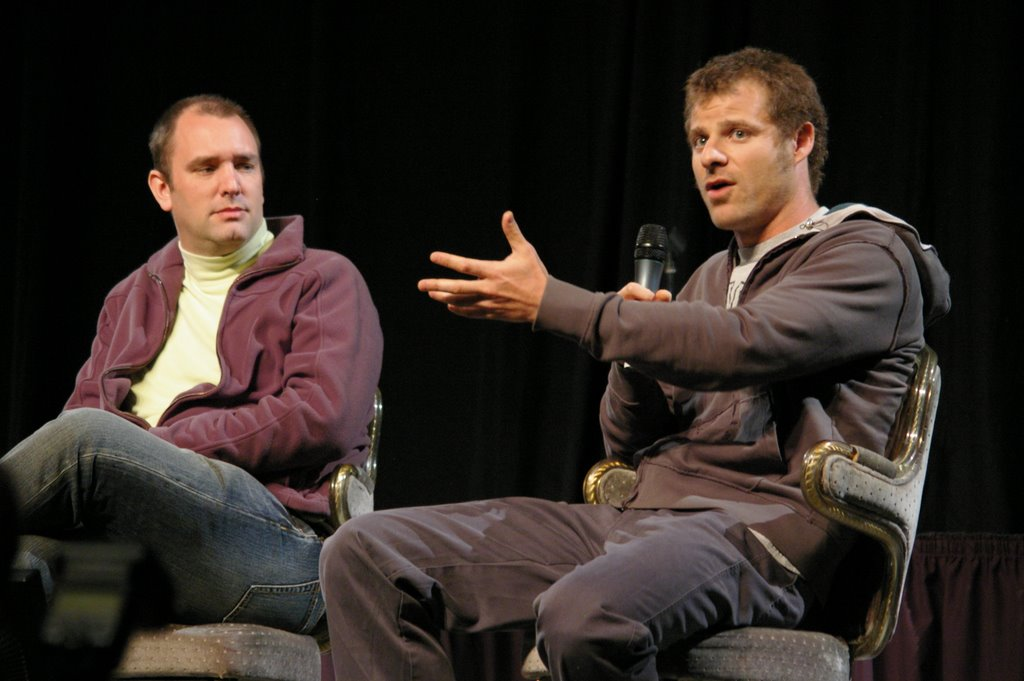
South Park co-creators Trey Parker and Matt Stone wrote "Damien"

"Damien" was written by series co-creators Trey Parker and Matt Stone, with additional dialogue by Dave Polsky, and was directed by Parker. Parker said he and Stone did not intend for "Damien" to be offensive to Christians or any other religion: "In South Park, Jesus is a great guy, he's on our show, and in this episode he's the hero. We're not in the business of offending people. We're in the business of making people laugh." The mean way Damien is treated by his fellow students when he joins the school, as well as Damien's reactions to the treatment, were inspired by Parker's experience of the second grade, when he started at a Cheyenne, Wyoming elementary school in the last three weeks of the school year. Parker said, "It was brutal ... Everybody already had their little groups and the year was almost over, so I wasn't going to fit into any of them, and I just wanted to destroy and kill, which was the inspiration for this show."

=== Animation ===
By the time "Damien" was animated, much of the drawing and animation responsibilities that had previously been handled by Parker and Stone were now being delegated to a team of animators. The duo were particularly proud of the animation during the boxing match between Jesus and Satan, which used elements of perspective and three-dimension seldom used in the series before; Parker said it was "definitely the most action [oriented] stuff we'd done [so far]".

While animating Jesus, Parker and Stone deliberately left glitches in the animation that made it appear skin was showing beneath the beard on the left-hand side of the character's face. Parker said this was done because it was the way Jesus appeared in the crudely animated The Spirit of Christmas, a 1995 animated short film by Parker and Stone that served as a precursor to South Park, and they wanted to maintain that nuance for the character.

=== Series firsts ===
Parker and Stone said a number of Cartman's characteristics which have endured throughout the South Park series started in "Damien". Specifically, his voice took on a higher-pitch that was more nasally and whiney than in previous episodes; Stone described it as a "self-indulgent accent". Some of his regular vocal mannerisms were also developed in the episode, including his use of the sound "Nyah" while saying the word "Here", and the way he says "Hey you guuuuuuys" while talking to his friends. Parker, who provides the voice of Cartman, said the characteristics came about naturally while filming the episode: "This show for some reason, for whatever reason, maybe I just lost interest, but I was trying all these messed up things with him and all these things sort of stuck."

"Damien" included the first appearance of Satan, who would become a commonly recurring character throughout the series. Although Satan displays an evil and unscrupulous personality in "Damien", he is portrayed in later episodes as a thoughtful, sensitive and often deeply conflicted character. "Damien" was the first episode Parker and Stone wrote that included school counselor Mr. Mackey and local religious leader Priest Maxi, but they were also included in "Mr. Hankey, the Christmas Poo", which aired before "Damien" even though it was produced afterward. Although Jesus had been introduced as a South Park character in previous episodes, "Damien" marked the first time he interacted with the main characters outside of his public access talk show, Jesus and Pals. Parker said many viewers thought the character was a crazy person who falsely believed he was Jesus, and he and Stone wanted to show in this episode that he was supposed to be the actual Jesus. "Damien" is also the first episode to feature South Park's bar, which is simply called "Bar".

Prior to the broadcast, Parker and Stone said "Damien" would be the first episode in which Kenny would not be killed; ultimately, however, Kenny was shot by Jimbo at the end of the pay-per-view fight. Kenny is turned into a duck-billed platypus in the episode, which Parker said was done because, "Duck billed platypuses are something I've always been infatuated with. They're just so bizarre." In the original script, Pip, the unpopular British student inspired by the character of the same name in Charles Dickens' Great Expectations, was originally supposed to be killed and permanently removed from the show after "Damien", in which Damien projects Pip into the air and blows him up in a shower of fireworks. However, Parker and Stone decided they should not kill any student characters except for Kenny, so they decided not to kill Pip and to bring him back for future episodes.

=== Guest stars ===
Michael Buffer, a boxing ring announcer known for his catchphrase, "Let's get ready to rumble!", made a guest appearance as himself in "Damien". Parker and Stone originally planned to use the catchphrase without Buffer, but when they learned that Buffer had legally trademarked the phrase, they included him in the episode since getting the rights for the catchphrase cost nearly as much as hiring Buffer for a guest appearance. Parker and Stone both said Buffer was friendly and they enjoyed working with him. Fellow animator Mike Judge, creator of Beavis and Butt-Head and King of the Hill (and a close friend of Parker and Stone), had originally been slated to provide the voice of the Damien character, and even recorded several lines for the part. However, since Judge lives in Austin, Texas, it proved too difficult for him to come back and rerecord lines as the script and episode changed, so Stone instead provided the character's voice. Judge later provided Kenny's un-muffled line when he removed his parka in South Park: Bigger, Longer & Uncut.

== Themes ==
"Damien" has been described as a satire on religion, faith and the nature of good and evil, as well as a commentary on commercialism and the cult of celebrity in American culture. Parker said the writers sought to satirize the speed and ease at which the followers of Jesus lose faith in him and bet against him. Religious writer Michel Clasquin said the abandonment of Jesus demonstrates, "Like many people in the real world, the faith of the town's people cannot withstand the hard times." Parker said, "Everybody puts their trust in Satan and ends up getting screwed. There is a bigger message – all in all, a pretty wholesome message. That's why South Park works. Sometimes we have a message."

Parker also said he and Stone purposely wrote the episode to present Jesus as the hero from a "humanist approach"; Clasquin said this is demonstrated by the fact that Jesus becomes caught up in people's expectations for the fight and becomes offended when people bet against him: "This satirical gesture beautifully draws attention to the sheer humanity of Jesus. He really is a man, just as we are men and women. He is open to fear and uncertainty." Several writers said the episode also lampooned the way Americans can turn anything, even a religious situation, into a commercially hyped event. Matt Zoller Seitz of The Star-Ledger said: "They aren't making fun of organized religion (though they have in the past). They're making fun of those who would turn religion into entertainment and entertainment into a kind of religion." Seitz said the episode mocks "morality cops who misbehave in private" like Priest Maxi, who secretly bets the parish against Jesus even as he admonished congregation members for siding with Satan.

Religious writer Michel Clasquin said the episode also demonstrates the ease with which people blend their religious convictions with lessons from pop culture, particularly with Stan's confusion of a Star Trek quote with a lesson from Jesus Christ. Additionally, Clasquin said the fact that even Priest Maxi recognizes Jesus as "that guy from the public access show" demonstrates that even the supposedly most religious people are not always the most open to genuine religious experiences. Clasquin also said elements of the Crucifixion of Jesus are alluded to in the boxing match with Satan.

In addition to the religious themes, the cruel way in which Damien is treated by the other children is a satire on the tendency of schoolchildren to relentlessly pick on new students. Stone said of this aspect of the episode, "The whole basis of South Park was that kids are little shitheads and civilization and society controls them. Instead of what a lot of hippies and Democrats think, which is we're born innocent and pure and society corrupts us. We believe the first way, that society controls you and makes you a better person, ultimately, because when you're little, you're just a little asshole."

== Cultural references ==
The voice for Satan, provided by Parker, was inspired by the voice of the Pinhead character at the ending of the 1988 horror film, Hellbound: Hellraiser II, when Pinhead emotionally recalls his old life, when he was a good person. The animators went through several sketch drafts for Satan because, in Parker's words, "There's so many ways to go with him and we couldn't figure out the right one for a long time". The large and muscular look of the character stemmed from the fact that the script called for Satan to massively outweigh Jesus, and that look has persisted for the character throughout the rest of the series.

The character of Damien himself was also first featured in this episode; although he appeared as a background character in a handful of future episodes, he seldom has a speaking role and is never again featured as prominently as he was in "Damien". The character was inspired by Damien Thorn, the child antichrist character in the 1976 horror film The Omen. The music which plays in the episode whenever Damien performs magic is also directly inspired by the music from that film; that same demonic chorus would later be reused in the twelfth season episode "Britney's New Look". (The lyric "Rectus Dominus" repeatedly sung by the demonic chorus in the episode translates from Latin as "Ass Master".) The scene in which the boys tell Damien his mom is "a real dog" is also a reference to The Omen. In that film, the actual Antichrist's mother was a jackal.

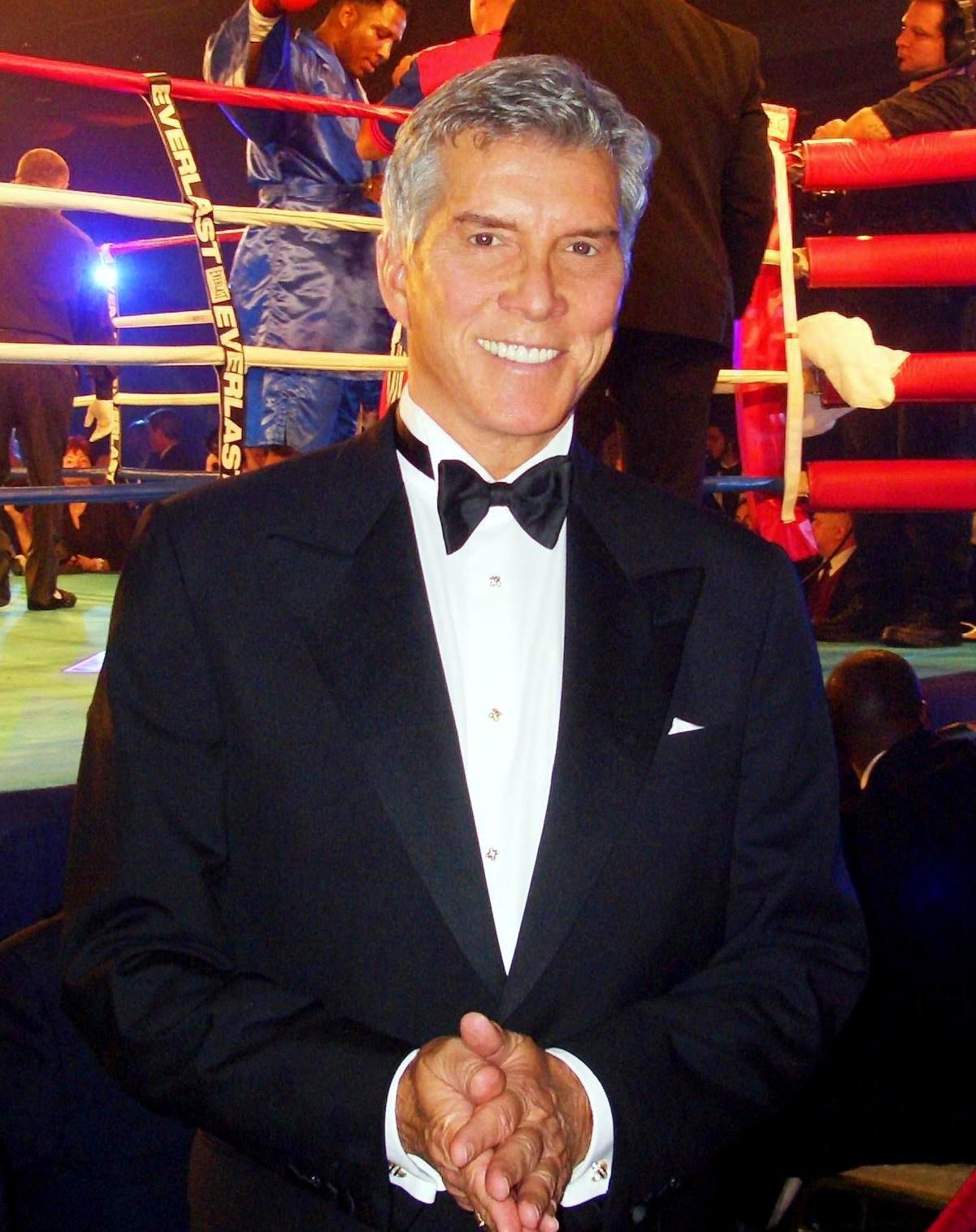
Professional ring announcer Michael Buffer made a guest appearance in the episode, in which he spoke his trademark phrase, "Let's get ready to rumble!"

In addition to Michael Buffer, the American boxing promoter Don King is featured prominently in "Damien" as Satan's promoter. Parker said he and Stone decided to spoof King only because "it's just sort of who annoyed us that week. It's so random ... there is no point to who we're ripping on. It's definitely nothing personal." Nancy Kerrigan, the Olympic figure skater attacked on orders of fellow skater Tonya Harding at the 1994 Winter Olympics, is referred to in a pep talk Stan gives Jesus. Stan wrongfully claims Kerrigan won the gold medal until Kyle reminds him she won the silver; Parker said this was done because he felt the perception of Kerrigan was extremely high among Americans considering she only actually achieved second place. During that same pep talk, Stan tells Jesus, "You know, someone once said, 'Don't try to be a great man, just be a man.'" Although Stan says this was a quote from Jesus himself, it was actually a line from the 1996 film, Star Trek: First Contact. "Damien" also includes a reference to singer Nancy Sinatra, the daughter of legendary crooner Frank Sinatra. Mr. Garrison, while discussing great singers of the baroque period, goes on to say that "Nancy Sinatra was quite a choice piece of ass".

The Jesus Vs. Satan pay-per-view event "Boutin' at the Mountain" is a parody of similarly advertised pay-to-watch boxing events featured on the premium cable channel HBO. Before Jimbo shoots Kenny in his platypus state, he screams, "It's coming right for us!" This is a reference to the previous South Park episode "Volcano", in which Jimbo takes the children hunting and tells them to shout the phrase before shooting anything to get around restrictive hunting laws. Cartman insults Damien by asking if he got his haircut from Stevie Wonder, a blind soul and R&B singer. For his birthday, Cartman wants the complete line of a set of action figures called Mega Man. Although they share the name with the popular Mega Man video game series, the multi-colored figures were actually inspired by both the anime series Voltron as well as Mighty Morphin Power Rangers, the 1993 children's action series which was still popular at the time of the episode's original broadcast. The script was originally written with direct references to the Power Rangers, but Comedy Central asked Parker and Stone to change the name due to copyright issues. The figures were stated to be inspired by Voltron in the video game South Park: Chef's Luv Shack. Cartman receives Ants in the Pants, an actual children's tabletop game, as a birthday present. Stone described Ants in the Pants as "the lamest game ever", which is why Cartman responds so negatively to the gift in the episode.

== Release ==
"Damien" first aired on Comedy Central in the United States on February 4, 1998. It was highly anticipated in part because it was the first new episode of South Park in about two months, since the extremely popular Christmas special "Mr. Hankey, the Christmas Poo" aired on December 17, 1997. Before "Damien" even ran, Mike Duffy of Detroit Free Press said the episode was "certain to become one of the show's signature moments". In fact, Parker and Stone originally intended for "Damien" to be the season's Christmas episode. Although they had long planned to feature a talking piece of feces in the show, called Mr. Hankey, they did not decide to make him a Christmas character until halfway through the filming of "Damien", during which time they decided to make a separate holiday episode instead, centered around the Mr. Hankey character. Nevertheless, they decided to finish production of "Damien" first, even though it would not air until after the "Mr. Hankey, the Christmas Poo" episode.

"Damien" was later released, along with eleven other episodes, in a three-DVD set in November 1998. It was included in the second volume, which also included the episodes "An Elephant Makes Love to a Pig", "Death" and "Pinkeye". The episode, along with the other twelve from the first season, was also included in the DVD release "South Park: The Complete First Season", which was released on November 12, 2002. Parker and Stone recorded commentary tracks for each episode, but they were not included with the DVDs due to "standards" issues with some of the statements; Parker and Stone refused to allow the tracks to be edited and censored, so they were released in a CD completely separately from the DVDs.

== Reception ==
"Damien" received a 6.4 Nielsen rating, a record high for the show until it was broken two weeks later by the episode "Mecha-Streisand" (which received a 6.9 rating, translating to 5.4 million viewers in 3.2 million households). It was the highest rated cable program the week it aired, with viewership among 18- to 49-year-olds being higher than the number of households. The network averages viewer ratings of 276,000 households during prime time and, prior to South Park, the channel's highest rating was from the second-season premiere of Absolutely Fabulous, which was seen by 1.24 million households.

Parker said following the tremendous success of "Mr Hankey, the Christmas Poo", much of the direct feedback he received for "Damien" was negative. Parker described it as the "first sort of backlash" he had experienced with South Park, with fans claiming the show was losing its edge and that Parker and Stone had "sold out". Parker said, "We kept hearing that word so much. We were like, 'What does that mean, sold out? What did we get and what did we do?' We just kept doing what we thought was funny, we didn't go start making commercials or anything. But everybody was saying we sold out." Nevertheless, the episode received generally positive reviews, and has been described as one of South Park's "classic episodes".

Rolling Stone contributor Doug Pratt called it a "high point" of the first season. Kinney Littlefield of the Orange County Register said of the episode, "All this proves once again that animated series are great platforms for hot topics that live action shows don't dare grab head on. South Park's allegory of good and evil is more apt and knowing than anything seen on 'Christy' or 'Touched by an Angel'. Funnier too." However, Littlefield also said some of the show's graphic dialogue, like the phrase "poop on a stick", was growing "pretty darn redundant". Gary Budzak of The Columbus Dispatch described the "Damien" episode as perhaps "the most outrageous yet". Virginia Rohan of The Record praised the episode, saying, "The episode is funny, and ultimately, good does conquer evil, albeit for all the wrong reasons." Chicago Sun-Times writer Lon Grahnke gave the episode three stars and called it simultaneously strange and funny. Eric Mink of the New York Daily News called the episode "awfully funny" and praised its satirical element, although he warned it was potentially very offensive to some viewers: "A scene in which the kids offer profane between-rounds encouragement to Jesus could make even thick-skinned viewers wince a bit." Likewise, Star-Ledger reporter Matt Zoller Seitz said, "Tonight's episode is crazy, vulgar and borderline blasphemous; it is also, if you're in the right frame of mind, paralyzingly funny."
