= Summer Sucks =

- South Park episode
- Episode no.: Season 2 Episode 8
- Directed by: Trey Parker
- Written by: Nancy M. Pimental; Trey Parker
- Production code: 208
- Original air date: June 24, 1998

Guest appearance
- Jonathan Katz as Dr. Katz

Episode chronology
← Previous "City on the Edge of Forever"	Next → "Chef's Chocolate Salty Balls"
- South Park season 2

"Summer Sucks" is the eighth episode of the second season of the American animated television series South Park. The 21st episode of the series overall, it originally aired on Comedy Central in the United States on June 24, 1998. The episode was written by series co-creator Trey Parker, along with Nancy M. Pimental, and directed by Parker. Jonathan Katz makes a guest appearance as himself. In the episode, Summer arrives and the town of South Park celebrate Independence Day by building and lighting a giant snake firework, since regular fireworks are illegal. Jimbo and Ned travel to Mexico to obtain fireworks, while the giant snake threatens to destroy the country. Meanwhile, Mr. Garrison struggles to cope with the loss of his hand puppet, Mr. Hat.

== Plot ==
Summer arrives in South Park, leaving the boys disgruntled because Winter activities are now impossible. Making things worse, Colorado has passed a statewide ban on fireworks after a kid in North Park had his arms blown off. In response, Jimbo and Ned travel to Mexico to purchase illegal fireworks and smuggle them back to Colorado. Meanwhile, Mayor McDaniels, discovering that snakes are still legal, has the largest one ever made for the town's Independence Day celebration. It is not until it has been lit that the mayor becomes concerned of its expiration; upon asking the manufacturer, they realize it will be impossible to extinguish and will not burn out until November of the following year. The ash travels across the town and country, destroying everything in its wake; Kenny is killed when the snake causes a set of bleachers to collapse and crush him beneath.

Meanwhile, Mr. Garrison begins to have a nervous breakdown because his companion, Mr. Hat, has disappeared. He sees Dr. Katz in New York City, who says that he is gay and Mr. Hat is really his gay side "trying to come out". Garrison rudely brushes him off, just as the giant snake kills him. Cartman, at this time, is taking swimming lessons, but has to contend with first graders urinating in the pool. Jimbo and Ned are captured by the border patrol after Jimbo accidentally revealed they were carrying illegal fireworks, but manage to escape (thanks to the snake) and head back to South Park with their fireworks.

The boys finally get their fireworks, and when they shoot them off, they destroy the snake trail. The ashes rain to the ground like snow, and people participate in winter activities using the black soot as ersatz snow. Mr. Garrison returns with a new companion, Mr. Twig. During this time, Cartman, being the only person in the pool, has decided to swim all the way from the shallow end of the pool to the deep end. He is successful, but is angered when the first graders return en masse and immediately turn the entirety of the pool water into urine. Chef returns to South Park from vacation, and when he sees everyone's faces covered in the black ash which makes them look like they're wearing blackface, he prepares to give everyone a beating.

== Production ==
When the snake starts to grow out of control, the boys play "Nearer, My God, to Thee", a reference to the 1997 film Titanic.

== Home media ==
All 18 episodes of the second season, including "Summer Sucks", were released on a DVD box set on June 3, 2003.
