= Spookyfish =

- South Park episode
- A frame showing "Spooky Vision" being used
- Episode no.: Season 2 Episode 15
- Directed by: Trey Parker
- Written by: Trey Parker
- Production code: 215
- Original air date: October 28, 1998

Episode chronology
← Previous "Chef Aid"	Next → "Merry Christmas, Charlie Manson!"
- South Park season 2

"Spookyfish" is the fifteenth episode of the second season of the American animated television series South Park. The 28th episode of the series overall, it originally aired on Comedy Central in the United States on October 28, 1998. The episode was written and directed by series co-creator Trey Parker. In the episode, Aunt Flo comes to stay, but her goldfish she bought for Stan Marsh turns out to be evil. Also, "Cartman" grows a beard and starts acting strangely nice and agreeable. It was the season's Halloween special, featuring the "spooky" theme of having pictures of Barbra Streisand in the screen corners, accompanied with the words "Spooky Vision" (in response to Streisand's negative reception to the season one episode "Mecha-Streisand").

== Plot ==
Cartman has skipped class, but shows up at the bus stop to meet the boys when they get off the bus, wearing a goatee and acting strangely agreeable. Cartman explains that he missed school that day because he was taking care of the house for his mother, who has the flu. The boys are shocked and confused at this news coming from the normally obnoxious and uncaring Cartman. Later, Stan arrives home, where his mother, Sharon Marsh, tells him that his Aunt Flo has come to visit. Aunt Flo gives Stan's sister Shelley a huge stereo system and gives Stan a goldfish in a bowl. Stan doesn't like the fish and finds it spooky because of the way it stares at him, but Sharon insists that he put it in his room.

The next morning at the bus stop, Stan and Kyle expect to meet the new version of Cartman. However, Cartman arrives in his normal obnoxious mood. That night, it is stormy, and the nice version of Cartman appears at Kenny's house to deliver some provisions for the storm. Stan is in bed, trying to sleep despite being repeatedly terrorized by the fish. Despite what Stan says, Sharon remains unconvinced that there is any trouble until Stan finds a dead body on the floor. Sharon believes that Stan is the murderer, and hides the body by burying it in the backyard instead of reporting it. Stan, Kyle, and Kenny discover that the two personalities of Cartman are in fact two separate people. Chef tells the boys that the kinder version of Cartman is from a parallel universe and that Stan's fish must be from the same world. Stan, Kyle, and the kind Cartman track down the Ancient Indian Burial Ground Pet Store, where they find the portal to the alternate universe.

Kenny is grabbed by the fish while the boys are standing around, dragged into the fishbowl head first and spun around violently, first with his feet sticking out, then the water turning red from the blood, his feet being pulled in, and finally being ejected from the bowl just in time for Sharon to find Kenny lying dead on the ground with one of his eyes missing and his signature rats eating him.

After returning the fish to the owner, the boys leave, just as Stan and Kyle from the evil world arrive to retrieve their Cartman. They align with the regular Cartman, and the trio find the regular Stan and Kyle along with Evil Cartman. The evil Stan and Kyle have a gun that sends things back to the alternate world, which is used on them by regular Stan. Stan and Kyle attempt to send their Cartman to the parallel universe, so they can retain the friendly Cartman, but the regular Cartman tricks them by saying something he wouldn't normally say.

== Broadcast ==
Before the episode was broadcast, Comedy Central promoted that the "South Park Halloween Special" would be broadcast in "Spooky Vision". Upon airing, "Spooky Vision" turned out to simply mean that singer Barbra Streisand's face was in each corner of the screen, with the words "Spooky Vision" written on the sides of the screen. In subsequent broadcasts of the episode, Comedy Central does not always use "Spooky Vision", although on occasion they still present the episode in its original format. Moreover, in the home video releases, the HD remaster version, on Netflix instant stream, and on the official South Park website, the episode retains the visuals of "Spooky Vision".

== Reception ==
Travis Fickett of IGN gave the episode a score of 9 out of 10, praising the "great shot in the episode where the two Cartmans meet, and [how] it looks like a badly pulled off split screen effect – an effect they stick with throughout the episode. It's little jokes like this, and attention to detail that set South Park apart in the early days." He pointed out how fun it was for him "to watch Sharon lose her mind as she believes the bodies she's burying are Stanley's victims. 'Such a handsome boy' she mutters to herself as she hauls a bloodied corpse out the door." He concluded by commenting on the "classic 'Who is the good one?' scene when The Cartmans face off", calling it "fun, funny, and clever and an early example of South Park greatness."

Phil Dyess-Nugent for The A.V. Club found the highlight of the episode to be Cartman's scenes, particularly those referencing Star Trek: The Original Series. He also enjoyed a joke involving Aunt Flo's Parkinson's disease, calling it "one of the random, sickest jokes that has (sic) ever knocked [him] off the couch". He disliked the "Spooky Vision" concept, however, comparing it to his dislike of "Mecha-Streisand", an episode from season one which also depicted Barbra Streisand.

== Home media ==
"Spookyfish" was first released in 2002 in a collection of episodes entitled Ghouls, Ghosts and Underpants Gnomes. The VHS version of this collection contains "Spookyfish", along with the third season Halloween episode "Korn's Groovy Pirate Ghost Mystery", as well as "Gnomes" from the second season. The DVD release contains all of the above, as well as the fourth-season episode "Trapper Keeper". South Park: The Complete Second Season was released on DVD on June 3, 2003. Episodes of season two have also been released digitally on services such as Amazon Video, the iTunes Store, and Xbox Live Marketplace.
