= Mecha-Streisand =

- South Park episode
- Episode no.: Season 1 Episode 12
- Directed by: Trey Parker
- Written by: Trey Parker; Philip Stark; Matt Stone
- Production code: 112
- Original air date: February 18, 1998

Guest appearance
- Robert Smith as Himself

Episode chronology
← Previous "Tom's Rhinoplasty"	Next → "Cartman's Mom Is a Dirty Slut"
- South Park season 1

"Mecha-Streisand" is the twelfth and penultimate episode of the first season of the American animated television series South Park. It originally aired on Comedy Central in the United States on February 18, 1998. In the episode, Barbra Streisand obtains the Diamond of Pantheos from Stan, Cartman, Kyle and Kenny, and transforms into a giant mechanical dinosaur called Mecha-Streisand. She is ultimately defeated by The Cure frontman Robert Smith, who himself transforms into a giant moth monster.

The episode was written by series co-creators Trey Parker and Matt Stone along with writer Philip Stark, and was directed by Parker. "Mecha-Streisand" parodies numerous popular Kaiju films and features portrayals of actor Sidney Poitier and film critic Leonard Maltin.

According to Nielsen ratings, "Mecha-Streisand" was watched by 5.4 million viewers, a record high viewership for a South Park episode at the time. Despite not having watched it, Streisand herself was critical of the series and her role in "Mecha-Streisand", although Leonard Maltin was complimentary about his portrayal.

== Plot ==
During a field trip to an archeological dig, Eric Cartman discovers a mysterious stone triangle, which he promptly throws away without interest. Shortly after Kyle Broflovski picks it up, the guide identifies the writing on the triangle as Anasazi. Kyle appears on television to discuss the find, resulting in a jealous Cartman's wanting the triangle back. Cartman constantly pesters Kyle until he returns the triangle to him. Meanwhile, Leonard Maltin comes to South Park and asks Chef whether he has seen Barbra Streisand. Maltin, having seen Kyle and the triangle on television, tells Chef the boys are in great danger.

Streisand herself finds the boys at the bus stop and demands the "Triangle of Zinthar", and gets angry when they reject her. As they search for Streisand, Maltin tells Chef she is seeking the boys' triangle to complete a powerful and ancient relic, the "Diamond of Pantheos", which will allow her to become an evil and dangerous creature capable of conquering the world. He explains that the diamond was originally split into two pieces and hidden at different points of the world, but Streisand had managed to find the first of the two. Streisand later dons a disguise and visits the boys again, offering them a monetary reward for the triangle. Stan Marsh, Kenny McCormick and Kyle are suspicious, but Cartman insists they go along for the money.

Streisand takes them to her condo in the mountains, where she chains the boys up and tortures them with her singing voice. Cartman relents and gives up the triangle. Streisand uses the triangle to complete the diamond, transforming herself into a giant mechanical dinosaur version of herself, Mecha-Streisand, and begins to lay waste to South Park (and the Colorado National Guard that was sent in to fight her) with her new form. Maltin and Chef arrive to free the boys, and Maltin asks Chef to call Robert Smith of The Cure for help. Maltin then transforms into a giant robot to battle Mecha-Streisand, but is quickly defeated. The boys evade fiery debris from the fight, but Kenny is killed when he stops to play tetherball and gets strangled by the rope. Actor Sidney Poitier arrives and turns into a giant fanged turtle to fight Mecha-Streisand, but he too is easily defeated. After getting a call from the boys and Chef, Robert Smith arrives and transforms into a giant moth creature.

During the ensuing battle, Smith-Moth manages to punch the Diamond of Pantheos away from Mecha-Streisand before flinging her into outer space, where she explodes and dies. The townspeople, including Jesus, joyfully praise Smith as a hero. As the singer walks off into the sunset, Kyle calls out "Disintegration is the best album ever!". The boys split the diamond again to try to prevent anyone else from getting its power and throw the pieces in the trash can. However, Kyle's little brother Ike finds the pieces of the diamond in the trash, resulting in the episode ending with the boys cowering in the presence of a new foe: Mecha-Ike.

== Production ==
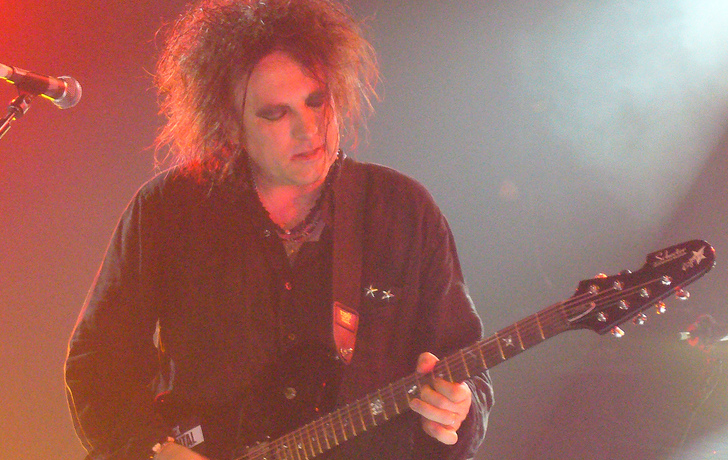
Robert Smith, who appeared in "Mecha-Streisand" as himself, was cast because South Park co-creator Trey Parker was a fan of his music.

"Mecha-Streisand" was written by series co-creators Trey Parker and Matt Stone, along with writer Philip Stark, and was directed by Parker. "Mecha-Streisand" first aired on Comedy Central in the United States on February 18, 1998. Robert Smith, lead vocalist and guitarist for the English rock band The Cure, makes a guest appearance as himself, marking only the second time a celebrity guest played a major role in an episode, after Natasha Henstridge in "Tom's Rhinoplasty". Following the success of "Mr. Hankey, the Christmas Poo", a large number of celebrities started contacting Comedy Central with the hopes of making guest appearances in South Park episodes, allowing Parker and Stone to practically take their pick of guest stars. Parker, a fan of The Cure, said it was his lifelong dream to meet Smith, and he was one of the few celebrities Parker specifically requested to make an appearance. Smith performed all of his lines via telephone and Parker used the first reading of each line, even though they were executed in a very dead-pan voice.

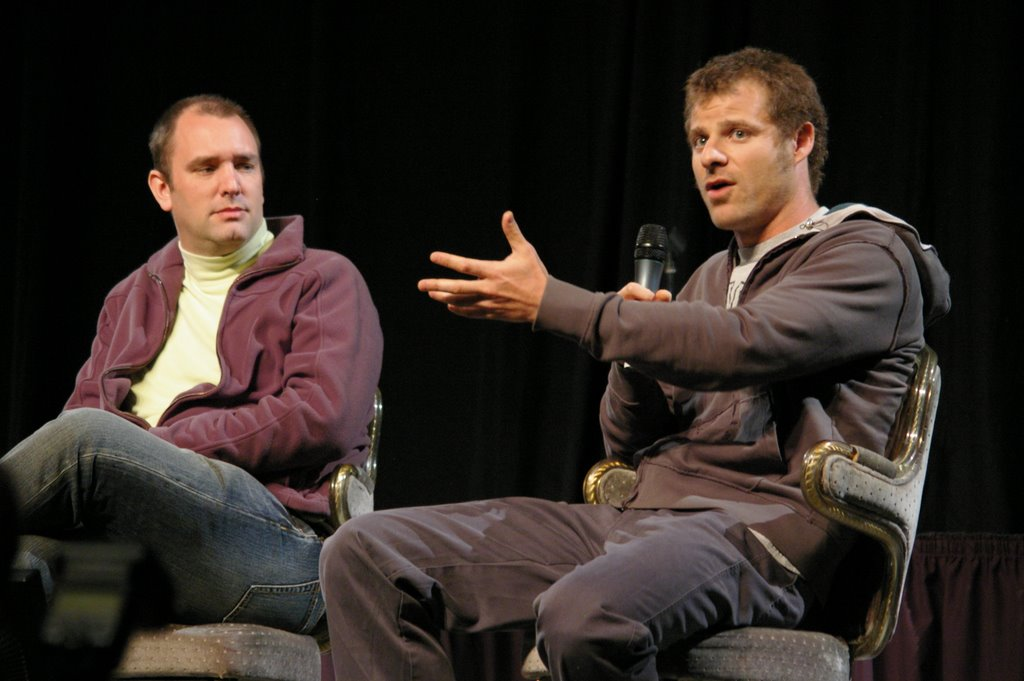
South Park co-creators Trey Parker and Matt Stone wrote "Mecha-Streisand".

When Parker and Stone made fun of celebrities in previous South Park episodes, they were chosen at random and "all just in good fun". However, they chose to mock Barbra Streisand based on a strong distaste for the actress. They explained that after Colorado passed the Amendment 2, an amendment to the Colorado state constitution which forbids homosexuals from being recognized as a protected class (and would later be struck down by the Supreme Court in Romer v. Evans), Streisand made a public statement in which she called the Coloradans "a bunch of hicks", vowing never to visit Colorado again. Parker said he also finds her singing voice "annoying", which inspired the scene with Streisand torturing the boys by singing to them. They tried to make Streisand's portrayal as "sick and disgusting as possible" in the episode. Mary Kay Bergman, a voice artist who had done most of the female voices on South Park, portrayed Streisand in the episode.

South Park animators created the episode using PowerAnimator, the Alias Systems Corporation animation program most commonly known as "Alias". Eric Stough, director of animation for the series, said "Mecha-Streisand" was slightly more challenging to animate than other first-season episodes due to the laser beam-type effects featured in the final monster fight, which were specifically designed to resemble a low-budget monster movie with poor graphics. The scenes with an instructional guide taking the kids on a fossil hunt were based on real-life arrowhead-digging excursions Parker and Stone went on in Red Rocks Park during their childhood in Colorado. During a scene with Chef and Leonard Maltin driving in a car, actual video footage of Colorado roads is visible through the back window of the car. The footage was shot by a friend of Parker and Stone and used because the animators did not yet know how to create roads in perspective.

== Cultural references ==
"Mecha-Streisand" parodies Kaiju films such as Godzilla, Gamera, Mothra, and Ultraman. Parker and Stone watched many Godzilla films during their childhoods, and Parker said he knew from the beginning of South Park that he would base an episode around the films. Streisand is based on Mechagodzilla, the mechanical doppelgänger of Godzilla. Smith is based on Mothra, the giant moth-like monster from the 1961 film Mothra and also one of Godzilla's rivals, which Parker described as his favorite of the Kaiju films. The scene in which six-inch-tall twins appear and ask actor Sidney Poitier to fight Mecha-Streisand are based on similar scenes and characters from the Mothra film. Poitier portrays a monster similar to Gamera, a flying turtle monster, and film critic Leonard Maltin transforms into a giant mechanical superhero resembling that of Japanese television superhero Ultraman. During the fights sequence, Stan shouts for Smith to "use robot punch", a line frequently used in Japanese robot television shows. The Diamond of Pantheos, on the other hand, closely resembles the pendant worn by a major character in the anime Galaxy Express 999.

When the monsters battle each other at the end of the episode, a Japanese man sings songs about each of the monsters while they approach. This mirrors a common element throughout actual Japanese monster movies, which commonly have theme songs for the monster characters. Parker wrote the songs in Japanese language. The English translation for the lyrics sung when Robert Smith transforms are, "I really like Robert Smith", and the lyrics sung about Mecha-Streisand translate as, "Barbra, Barbra, she's a bitch, Barbra". When Streisand becomes Mecha-Streisand, the line written in Japanese translates as, "From this moment on, I am Mecha-Streisand!", but Parker said Bergman misread some of the words so the on-air translation was imperfect. Before Leonard Maltin transforms, he screams in Japanese, "Listen, listen, here's a tulip", which Parker said is a phrase Japanese children say before passing gas.

During the fight scene, a number of skyscrapers are shown getting destroyed. Parker, who acknowledged the buildings were never featured in any other South Park episode, said they were modeled after real-life skyscrapers in Denver and included in "Mecha-Streisand" only so they could get destroyed during the monster fight, a frequent element of battles in real Japanese monster films. Musical elements from the Hanna-Barbera cartoon Super Friends are also featured during the battle. Actress Sally Struthers, who was previously lampooned in the South Park episode "Starvin' Marvin", is briefly seen during a scene in "Mecha-Streisand", in which she is filming a movie scene with Poitier. As Robert Smith is leaving, Kyle shouts to him, "Disintegration is the best album ever!" The line was based on Parker's own enthusiasm for The Cure's 1989 album, Disintegration, and Robert Smith himself would go on to say in an interview that the line was his "happiest moment", although he originally misidentified the line as being said by Stan. As Smith walks into the sunset, a version of The Cure's "Let's Go to Bed" is played on the Japanese Lute (Biwa). Officer Barbrady makes a reference to singer-songwriter Fiona Apple with the line, "Well, you ain't Fiona Apple, and if you ain't Fiona Apple, I don't give a rat's ass." At the time of "Mecha-Streisand"'s airing, Apple had recently released her first studio album Tidal.

== Reception and release ==
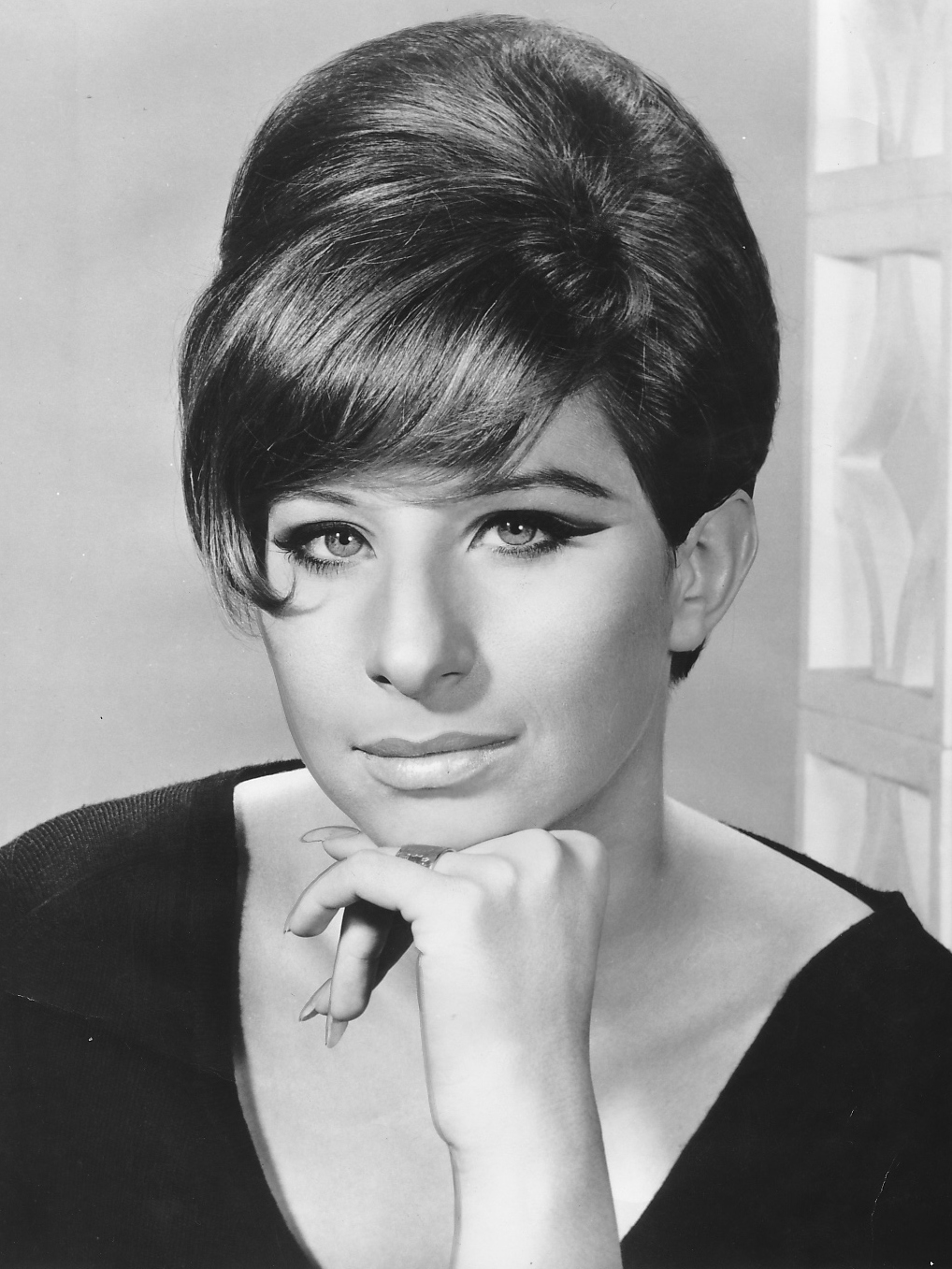
Barbra Streisand was highly critical of South Park and her portrayal in "Mecha-Streisand".

In its original American broadcast on February 18, 1998, "Mecha-Streisand" received a 6.9 Nielsen rating, translating to 5.4 million viewers in 3.2 million households. At the time, it was a record high viewership for a South Park episode, breaking the record that was set earlier that month by "Damien", and was ten times the average of Comedy Central's non-South Park programming. Mecha-Streisand remained the highest rated episode in the history of South Park until 2001 when "Scott Tenorman Must Die" broke the record with an 8.1 Nielsen rating.

Parker and Stone were very happy with the episode, but received feedback from fans that it was one of the weaker episodes of the first season, and that the constant jokes about Barbra Streisand started to grow redundant. Many fans also did not like Kenny's tether ball accident death scene because it had nothing to do with the plot of the episode, which Parker and Stone said was supposed to be the joke.

Streisand herself took a negative view of her portrayal, stating in a Mirabella interview,

I wasn't even aware of this show until I read in Time magazine that they had used me in a very negative way. Let me say that I enjoy satire and parody and I loved the movie In & Out. It made me laugh. It wasn't mean-spirited. But I wonder if shows like South Park and Beavis and Butt-head don't add to the cynicism and negativity in our culture, especially in children. These youngsters are formulating their attitudes and maybe they come away feeling that any woman who dares to accomplish something is the incarnation of self-centeredness and greed. And that would be very unfortunate, especially for young girls.

Parker and Stone created the second season episode "Spookyfish" in response, where they took a picture of Streisand's head, placed the image into all four corners of the screen and called it "Spooky vision".

Leonard Maltin was complimentary about "Mecha-Streisand", and told Parker and Stone his children particularly enjoyed his portrayal in the episode. Regarding his appearance, Robert Smith had claimed that nothing in his career mattered as much to his younger nephews and nieces as the fact that he was featured on South Park.

"Mecha-Streisand" was released, along with 11 other episodes, in a three-disc DVD set in November 1998. It was included in the third volume, which also included the episodes "Starvin' Marvin", "Mr. Hankey, the Christmas Poo" and "Tom's Rhinoplasty". "Mecha-Streisand", along with the other twelve episodes from the first season, was also included in the DVD release "South Park: The Complete First Season", which was released on November 12, 2002. Parker and Stone recorded commentary tracks for each episode, but they were not included with the DVDs due to "standards" issues with some of the statements; Parker and Stone refused to allow the tracks to be edited and censored, so they were released in a CD separate from the DVDs. In 2008, Parker and Stone made "Mecha-Streisand" and all South Park episodes available to watch for free on the show's official website, "South Park Studios".

The episode was revisited twelve years later in the show's 200th episode, along with many other past South Park storylines, featuring a redesigned Mecha-Streisand. During a duet with Neil Diamond, Mecha-Streisand lets out a green cloud from her groin that disgusts the people of South Park. The original Japanese theme song for the creature also plays in the episode. The Mecha-Streisand featured in "200" is designed with more sophisticated computer imagery than the original, as the animation quality of the series has improved over the years in general.
