= Chef Aid =

- South Park episode
- Episode no.: Season 2 Episode 14
- Directed by: Trey Parker
- Written by: Trey Parker; Matt Stone
- Production code: 214
- Original air date: October 7, 1998

Guest appearances
- Joe Strummer; Rancid; Ozzy Osbourne; Ween; Primus; Elton John; Meat Loaf; Rick James; Devo

Episode chronology
← Previous "Cow Days"	Next → "Spookyfish"
- South Park season 2

"Chef Aid" is the fourteenth episode of the second season of the American animated television series South Park. The 27th episode of the series overall, it originally aired on Comedy Central in the United States on October 7, 1998. The episode was written by series co-creators Trey Parker and Matt Stone, and directed by Parker. Guest stars in this episode include Joe Strummer, Rancid, Ozzy Osbourne, Ween, Primus, Elton John, Meat Loaf and Rick James.

In the episode, Chef tries to claim that Alanis Morissette plagiarized his song "Stinky Britches". However, the record company executive decides to sue him for harassment for this. The executive wins the lawsuit, and Chef has 24 hours to come up with the money or he will face a 4-year prison sentence. Meanwhile, Mr. Garrison witnesses many strange attempts on Mr. Twig's life.

== Plot ==
Chef discovers that Alanis Morissette's hit song "Stinky Britches" is a song that he wrote many years ago, before abandoning his musical aspirations. He contacts a record company executive, seeking only to have his name credited as the composer of "Stinky Britches". The record company refuses, and furthermore, hires Johnnie Cochran, who files a lawsuit against him for harassment. Cochran employs the "Chewbacca defense", resulting in a win for the record company and damages to be paid by the defense. Chef now has 24 hours to come up with the money or face four years of incarceration. Chef makes money by becoming a prostitute; instead of paying the executive, he intends to hire Cochran so he can sue the record company. Unfortunately, Chef's money is seized and he is sent to jail the next day.

Meanwhile, Mr. Garrison witnesses many strange attempts on Mr. Twig's life; he finds him boiling in a pot of water, and later snapped in half. The evidence begins to point to Mr. Hat as the culprit, culminating in a showdown between Mr. Garrison and Mr. Hat which lands the former in jail. Mr. Hat breaks Mr. Garrison and Chef out of their cell. Mr. Garrison and Mr. Hat eventually make up their differences and get back together.

The boys try to help Chef by rounding up various musicians, whose careers have been boosted by Chef's advice, to hold a benefit concert. The record company executive sabotages the concert, but the outpouring of support for Chef touches Cochran, who agrees to defend Chef. He uses the Chewbacca Defense again (indirectly killing a juror when the defense so overwhelmed them that their head exploded), ending with Chef finally getting his name on the album.

== Album release ==
An album was released based on the episode. It featured 21 songs, some being extended and unaired songs from this episode and previous episodes in the series, others being completely original to the album. Many notable artists from several different genres made cameo appearances on the album.

== Chewbacca defense ==
The Chewbacca defense is a fictional legal strategy used in Chef Aid. It is a form of Red Herring argument, used to deliberately confuse the jury. The concept satirized attorney Johnnie Cochran's closing argument defending O. J. Simpson in his murder trial; he stated to the jury, "If it doesn't fit, you must acquit", in reference to an earlier point in the trial when prosecutor Christopher Darden asked Simpson to try on a bloody glove found at the murder scene, and Simpson could not put it on because it did not fit his hand.

Criminologist Dr. Thomas O'Connor says that when DNA evidence shows "inclusion", that is, does not exonerate a client by exclusion from the DNA sample provided, "About the only thing you can do is attack the lab for its [lack of] quality assurance and proficiency testing, or use a 'Chewbacca defense' [...] and try to razzle-dazzle the jury about how complex and complicated the other side's evidence or probability estimates are." Forensic scientist Erin Kenneally has argued that court challenges to digital evidence frequently use the Chewbacca defense per se, in that they present multiple alternative explanations of forensic evidence obtained from computers and internet providers to raise the reasonable doubt understood by a jury. Kenneally also presents methods that can be used to rebut a Chewbacca defense. Kenneally and colleague Anjali Swienton have presented this topic before the Florida State Court System and at the 2005 American Academy of Forensic Sciences annual meeting.

The term has also seen use in political commentary; in 2007, Ellis Weiner wrote in The Huffington Post that Dinesh D'Souza was using the Chewbacca defense in criticism of new Speaker of the House Nancy Pelosi, defining it as when "someone asserts his claim by saying something so patently nonsensical that the listener's brain shuts down completely."

== Home media ==
All 18 episodes of the second season, including "Chef Aid", were released on a DVD box set on June 3, 2003.
