= Mr. Hankey, the Christmas Poo =

- South Park episode
- Mr. Hankey emerges from Kyle's toilet. Parker and Stone designed Mr. Hankey to resemble Mickey Mouse as he appeared in the 1928 short film Steamboat Willie.
- Episode no.: Season 1 Episode 9
- Directed by: Trey Parker; Matt Stone
- Written by: Trey Parker; Matt Stone
- Production code: 110
- Original air date: December 17, 1997

Episode chronology
← Previous "Starvin' Marvin"	Next → "Damien"
- South Park season 1

"Mr. Hankey, the Christmas Poo" is the ninth episode of the first season of the American animated television series South Park. It originally aired on Comedy Central in the United States on December 17, 1997. The episode follows Kyle as he feels excluded from the town's Christmas celebrations due to being Jewish, finding solace in Mr. Hankey, a sentient piece of feces. Mr. Hankey does not come alive in the presence of other characters, who consequently think that Kyle is delusional. Meanwhile, the townspeople remove all religious and commercialized aspects of Christmas to remain politically correct and inoffensive.

The episode was written and directed by co-creators Trey Parker and Matt Stone. The Mr. Hankey character was based on an idea from Parker's childhood; when Parker and Stone conceived the South Park series, they intended for Mr. Hankey to be the lead character. Heavily influenced by A Charlie Brown Christmas, "Mr. Hankey, the Christmas Poo" was the first South Park Christmas episode; the first musical episode; and the first episode, as well as the only one of the first season, in which Kenny does not die. In addition to Mr. Hankey, the episode introduced Craig Tucker, the school counselor Mr. Mackey, Kyle's father Gerald Broflovski, and the songs "The Lonely Jew on Christmas" and "Kyle's Mom's a Bitch". It served as a satire of political correctness and religious sensitivity.

The episode received generally positive reviews and has been described as one of the classic South Park episodes. It was watched by 4.55 million viewers during its original broadcast, the highest Nielsen rating to that date for South Park and the fourth-highest overall for a basic cable entertainment program of 1997.

== Plot ==
Kyle is cast as Saint Joseph in South Park Elementary's Christmas play, but is forced to withdraw when Kyle's mother Sheila expresses anger that her Jewish son is participating in a Nativity play. In response to Mr. Garrison's question, Kyle suggests the "Mr. Hankey" song as a secular and nonsectarian substitute, but is rejected because no one else believes in its eponymous subject, a living piece of feces. Kyle leaves the school feeling lonely and excluded because, being Jewish, he cannot celebrate Christmas with everyone else.

In the town square, various interest groups meet to complain about how Christmas is presented in South Park; secular activists are angry that the town is showing a nativity scene on municipal property, Shiela is angry at the perceived marginalization of the Jewish community, devout Christians (led by Father Maxi) are angry about secular-commercial aspects of Christmas such as Santa Claus, and environmentalists are angry at the concept of cutting down trees for Christmas. Mayor McDaniels decides that anything deemed offensive will be removed from the Christmas celebrations; because so many people are offended about so many different things, this leads to seemingly innocuous things like mistletoe and decorative stars being removed. Kyle again suggests that the town use Mr. Hankey, since he does not discriminate against anyone, but to no avail. At home, Kyle is scolded by his parents for believing in Mr. Hankey. While Kyle is brushing his teeth, Mr. Hankey emerges from the toilet and spreads feces stains around the bathroom, for which Kyle is blamed. Kyle decides to take Mr. Hankey to school to prove his existence, but Mr. Hankey does not come alive in front of people who do not believe in him. After Cartman sings an insulting song about Sheila, Mr. Hankey lunges at him in retaliation, which everyone perceives as Kyle throwing feces at Cartman. Kyle is sent to Mr. Mackey, the guidance counselor, but gets into further trouble when Mr. Hankey bathes in Mackey's coffee, which, again, Mr. Mackey perceives as an inanimate log of feces. Cartman, Stan, and Kenny believe Kyle is insane and have him committed to a mental institution.

The night of the play arrives, and with the performance stripped of all Christmas symbols, the children instead present a minimalist song and dance by Philip Glass. The parents, bemused and unentertained by the secular play, begin scapegoating one another for "ruining" Christmas and a fight ensues. When Chef is informed of the situation, he reveals that he too believes in Mr. Hankey. When everyone else starts believing, Mr. Hankey reveals himself and scolds them for fixating on the negative aspects of Christmas and losing sight of the true meaning of the holiday. With Mr. Hankey's existence confirmed, Kyle is released from the asylum and joins the townspeople in caroling as Mr. Hankey departs with Santa Claus. Cartman, Stan, and Kyle realize that something is amiss. As The End appears, Kenny cheers, indicating excitement and relief that, for once, he managed to survive an entire episode.

During the end credits, Jesus dejectedly sings "Happy Birthday to You" to himself alone in his television studio.

== Production ==
=== Conception and early history ===
The Mr. Hankey character was based on an idea Trey Parker's father created when he was toilet-training Trey as a child. Parker said he refused to flush the toilet as a child, so his father told him if he did not flush down his stool, which he called "Mr. Hankey", it would come to life and kill him. The concept stayed with Parker throughout his childhood; starting in elementary school and throughout his entire education, he would often draw the character in class, wearing a sailor's hat instead of the Santa Claus hat he would later wear in South Park. Parker shared the concept with future South Park co-creator Matt Stone when the two met at the University of Colorado at Boulder, and the duo immediately knew they wanted to create a film or production involving Mr. Hankey. The two discussed filming a three-minute short film involving a boy who befriended the talking stool, but Mr. Hankey would not come alive for anybody else, prompting others to believe the boy was crazy. They planned for the boy's parents to find him holding a stool in the bathroom and blame the child for smearing feces along the walls when it was actually Mr. Hankey's fault; they also planned to have him visit a school counselor, where Mr. Hankey would leap into the counselor's coffee mug and the boy would be blamed. At the end, it would turn out that the boy was indeed crazy and Mr. Hankey was not real at all, but a figment of the boy's imagination. Parker and Stone never made the short film, but practically all of its elements were included in the future South Park episode "Mr. Hankey, the Christmas Poo", with the notable exception of the ending. Although the Mr. Hankey short film was never made, Parker and Stone made two Christmas-related animated short films called The Spirit of Christmas, which served as precursors to the South Park series.

After the shorts began to generate interest for a possible television series, Parker and Stone conceived the idea of an adult-animated show with four children as main protagonists, and one of the minor characters included a talking stool named Mr. Hankey. They contacted the Fox Broadcasting Company about the show's concept, and the network arranged a meeting with the duo at its office in Century City to discuss how it would proceed. However, Parker and Stone said during the meeting that Fox did not like a talking poo character on its network and demanded the duo remove him, which they refused. When Fox continued to stand by its decision (and supported by sister company 20th Century Fox Television, the show's original developer), the duo cut ties with the network and began pitching the series somewhere else. After Comedy Central expressed interest in the series, Parker and Stone brought up the idea of a Mr. Hankey episode during negotiations with the network executives. Parker claimed during a meeting, he said, "One thing we have to know before we really go any further: how do you feel about talking poo?" The executives were receptive to the idea, which Parker said was one of the main reasons he and Stone decided to sign on with the channel.

The elements of the episode involving Kyle's loneliness as a Jew during Christmas were inspired by Parker and Stone's perceptions of Jews growing up in Colorado during their childhood. Although the two went to different schools, they both witnessed Jewish children get beaten up and bullied because both of their schools had very few Jewish students to begin with; although Stone himself is Jewish, he was not raised as a practicing Jew and so he did not experience much of the bullying himself firsthand. The unsuccessful efforts by the South Park Elementary School in the episode to include people of non-Christian denomination were inspired by similarly failed attempts Parker and Stone witnessed growing up. Parker cited as an example a chorus concert in which the single Jewish student was asked to sing her own Hanukkah song while everybody else sang Christmas songs; although the idea was to make the student feel special, Parker said it only made her feel more lonely and isolated.

=== Episode production ===
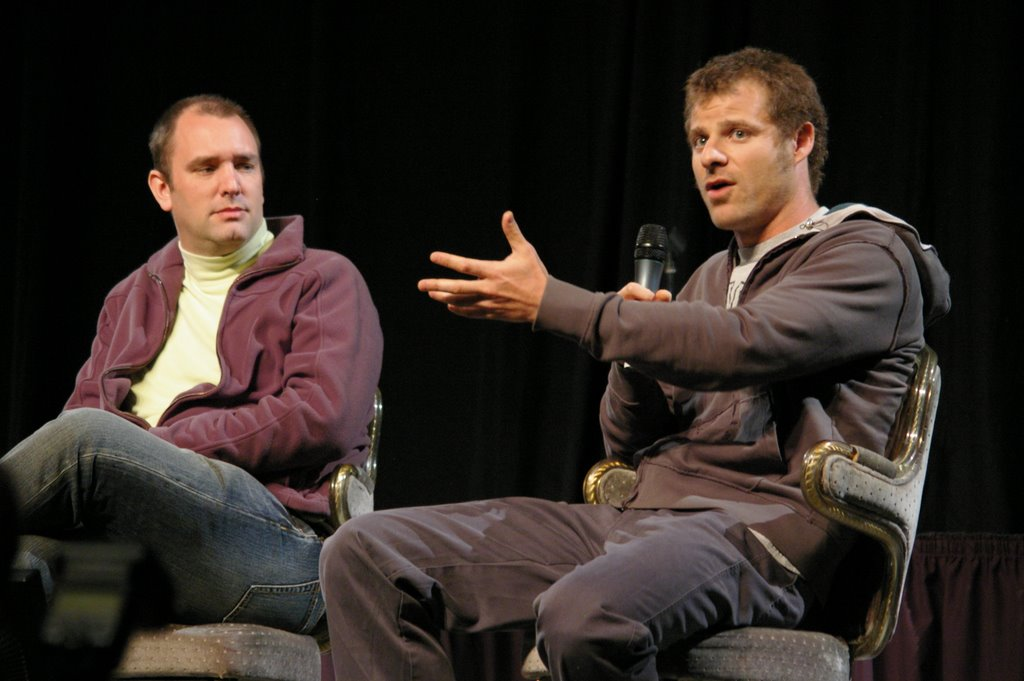
South Park co-creators Trey Parker and Matt Stone wrote "Mr. Hankey, the Christmas Poo"

"Mr. Hankey, the Christmas Poo" was written and directed by Parker and Stone, and first aired in the United States on Comedy Central on December 17, 1997. It was the first official South Park Christmas episode. Television journalists said the Spirit of Christmas shorts were precursors to Mr. Hankey and that they shared some common traits, but that the television episode was considered tamer and more tasteful. Parker and Stone originally conceived the episode "Damien", which involves a boxing match between Jesus and Satan, as the first season's Christmas episode. Although they had long planned to feature Mr. Hankey in the show, they did not decide to make him a Christmas character until halfway through the filming of "Damien". Once they made the decision, they decided to make "Mr. Hankey, the Christmas Poo" the holiday episode instead; although it would not air until after the "Mr. Hankey" episode, Parker and Stone finished production of "Damien" before working on "Mr. Hankey, the Christmas Poo".

At the time they were writing the episode, Parker and Stone had seen a large number of news reports about government buildings refusing to allow the display of models of the nativity scene and other Christian holiday symbols, in an effort not to offend other religions. Parker and Stone, as two agnostics who still appreciated the Christmas holiday, said they felt the idea was "ridiculous" and, according to Stone, "We just wanted Mr. Hankey to say Christmas was about good and about presents, and it doesn't have to be this religious [controversy]." The two sought to write an episode in the tradition of old classic Christmas specials with their own irreverent South Park twist, and so they watched the famous 1965 Peanuts special, A Charlie Brown Christmas, repeatedly during the production process. Parker said, "At this point, we just sort of wanted to do a Charlie Brown Christmas South Park version. That [special] was definitely a huge part of my life growing up."

The episode was considered the first South Park musical episode, and included such songs as "Mr. Hankey, the Christmas Poo", "A Lonely Jew on Christmas" and "Kyle's Mom is a Big Fat Bitch". Parker and Stone were initially concerned about making a musical because, Parker said, "The general rule was people hated musicals". For the Mr. Hankey character, Parker and Stone adapted most of the elements from the Mr. Hankey short film they planned in college, except that Mr. Hankey would prove to be real, not a figment of Kyle's imagination. Parker said this was decided because of his frustration with the character Mr. Snuffleupagus in the children's show Sesame Street; for his first 14 years on the show, Mr. Snuffleupagus was an imaginary character seen only by Big Bird, which Parker said "really bummed me out". Parker and Stone felt Mr. Hankey should embody the wholesomeness and morals of cartoons from the 1930s, so they designed him to resemble the version of Mickey Mouse in the 1928 cartoon Steamboat Willie, particularly in his eyes. For the scenes in which Mr. Hankey smears feces wherever he walks, the animators scanned images of spread out chocolate and fudge and inserted those images into the episode. Parker and Stone had trouble deciding on a voice for Mr. Hankey, but Stone said it came to him while eating a Sausage McMuffin at a McDonald's in New York City, while taking a break from promoting South Park to the press.

Although Comedy Central did not object to most aspects of the episode, they did require some edits to material they deemed potentially offensive. During rehearsal for a Nativity play, a baby Jesus resembling a fetus pops out of Wendy, who is playing the Virgin Mary, and is caught by Kyle, who is portraying Joseph of Nazareth. Although the scene was ultimately kept in the episode, Comedy Central executives had problems with it and Parker said they had to handle its animation "very carefully". Additionally, during filming of the live-action Mr. Hankey commercial, the baby originally held the Mr. Hankey stool and took a bite out of it. Comedy Central officials would not allow the scene in the episode and it was changed to portray the idea that the baby had already eaten the stool off-camera, which Parker said he felt was actually funnier.

"Mr. Hankey, the Christmas Poo" is the first episode in which Kenny was not killed. Parker and Stone deliberately included several scenes that looked like they might lead to Kenny's death, but they decided because it was Christmas that they would not kill him (though he would later go on to be killed in several subsequent Christmas episodes). The episode was also the first time Mr. Garrison was portrayed as an anti-semite and racist, particularly when he asks Mayor McDaniels if she can get rid of all the Mexicans in South Park. Parker said this decision was made because, "Garrison at that point had already shown himself to be the most messed up person in the entire town, and there's obviously so much wrong with him mentally. A person that disturbed being a racist is funny to us."

=== Home media and soundtrack release ===
"Mr. Hankey, the Christmas Poo" was released, along with 11 other episodes, in a three-DVD set in November 1998. It was included in the third volume, which also included the episodes "Starvin' Marvin", "Mecha-Streisand" and "Tom's Rhinoplasty". It was later released in the November 2007 DVD release "Christmas Time in South Park", which also included the episodes, "Merry Christmas, Charlie Manson!", "Mr. Hankey's Christmas Classics", "A Very Crappy Christmas", "Red Sleigh Down", "It's Christmas in Canada" and "Woodland Critter Christmas". The episode, along with the other 12 from the first season, was also included in the DVD release "South Park: The Complete First Season", which was released on November 12, 2002. Parker and Stone recorded commentary track for each episode, but they were not included with the DVDs due to "standards" issues with some of the statements; Parker and Stone refused to allow the tracks to be edited and censored, so they were released in a CD completely separately from the DVDs.

Songs from "Mr. Hankey, the Christmas Poo" were featured in the October 2007 CD soundtrack release called "Mr. Hankey's Christmas Classics". The Birmingham News said the album "gleefully tramples on one of America's most cherished holidays [and] will likely make even cynical listeners gasp".

== Themes ==
"There was this sort of backlash from agnostics saying, 'Don't force your Jesus stuff on us', and what we're trying to say with this show is, 'Hey, it's the one time of year where we're supposed to sort of have fun, so forget about all that.'"

— Trey Parker

"Mr. Hankey, the Christmas Poo" is a satire on political correctness and religious sensitivity, particularly in its portrayal of the characters organizing "The Happy, Non-Offensive, Non-Denominational Christmas Play" to avoid offending anyone of any religious background. While many Christmas specials focus on the religious, spiritual and moral values of the Christmas holiday rather than the commercial aspects, "Mr. Hankey, the Christmas Poo" actually embraces commercialism in Christmas, suggesting viewers should enjoy those elements of the holiday without taking religion too seriously. York University Professor Alison Halsall said of this aspect of the episode, "Again, Parker and Stone blur the sacred and the profane, in this instance, to gut holidays of their traditional meanings."

The episode has also been described as simultaneously embracing and parodying animated Christmas specials like A Charlie Brown Christmas, Frosty the Snowman and It's the Great Pumpkin, Charlie Brown. It has also been described as a commentary on the way Jewish children are overlooked during the Christmas holiday; this theme is overtly stated by Stan, who says at the end of the episode that "Jewish people are okay and that Hanukkah can be cool too", as well as Christmas. M. Keith Booker, author of Drawn to Television: Prime-Time Animation from The Flintstones to Family Guy, said although the episode is irreverent in its treatment of Christmas, "even if spearheaded by a singing turd, [it] is about as close as South Park ever comes to being sentimental and nostalgic". Literary critic Mark Caldwell said the fact that Kenny survived the episode demonstrates the episode's "strong, albeit dutifully ironic, undercurrent of conventional holiday decency."

Alison Halsall said "Mr. Hankey, the Christmas Poo" is the strongest example of a history of scatology, the study of excrement, throughout the South Park series. Halsall said the use of fecal matter as a character, and especially its tendency to smear parts of itself around as it moved, directly confronts the viewer with "the inherent dirtiness of the human body, no matter how much we try to aestheticize it, Mr. Hankey's stains systematically mess up the cleanliness of the social order. [...] South Park refuses sanitization through the gross-out factor."

== Cultural impact and references ==
Some writers consider Mr. Hankey one of the most easily recognizable and popular of the non-regular South Park characters. His high-pitched greeting, "Howdy-ho", was equally recognizable and became one of the most quoted lines from the show's first season. Several fan websites were made about the character within months of the episode's broadcast. In January 1998, Entertainment Weekly reported that Comedy Central executives had plans to produce a Mr. Hankey chocolate bar. Larry Lieberman, the channel's vice president of strategic planning and new business development, said a sketch of a Mr. Hankey candy bar was drawn and circulated, but mainly as a joke; he said no serious discussions were held about producing such an item. A stuffed Mr. Hankey became one of the most popular South Park tie-in products of the 1998 Christmas season.

In addition to the title character, "Mr. Hankey, the Christmas Poo" included the first appearances of characters Father Maxi and Mr. Mackey. Both characters appeared in "Damien", which was produced before "Mr. Hankey, the Christmas Poo", but the Christmas episode aired first. Mr. Mackey was inspired by Parker's real-life school guidance counselor; Parker, who provides the voice for Mackey, said the real-life counselor was similarly thin and wiry and that Parker's voice for Mr. Mackey is an exact, unexaggerated version of how his counselor spoke.

"Mr. Hankey, the Christmas Poo" includes several references to the Peanuts holiday special, A Charlie Brown Christmas. A Christmas pageant features the same biblical quote spoken by Linus in that special; additionally, the music featured in the pageant is very similar to the Peanuts special's musical score by Vince Guaraldi, and the South Park kids go outside to catch falling snowflakes on their tongues in the same way as in the special.

A doctor prescribes Prozac, a real life antidepressant, to Kyle for his apparent love for feces, which he describes as "fecalphilia", a condition perhaps better known by the medical term coprophilia. Composer Philip Glass composes the avant-garde musical score for the non-denominational Christmas play. Stone and Parker both strongly dislike Glass; Parker, who was a music major in college, said, "I really thought you could basically tell a third grader to sit down at a keyboard and mess around and sell it as a Philip Glass album, and no one would know the difference." The do-it-yourself kit in the live action commercial, in which families can make their own Mr. Hankey, is similar to the Mr. Potato Head toy set.

== Reception ==
=== Reviews and ratings ===
Although Parker and Stone credit "Big Gay Al's Big Gay Boat Ride" as helping elevate the series, they felt "Mr. Hankey, the Christmas Poo" raised South Park to a new level of popularity and relevance. Parker said of it, "This was the episode that just vaulted everything." Following the success of "Mr. Hankey, the Christmas Poo", a large number of celebrities started contacting Comedy Central with the hopes of making guest appearances in South Park episodes. This allowed Parker and Stone to practically take their pick of guest stars, and led to appearances by Natasha Henstridge in "Tom's Rhinoplasty" and Robert Smith in "Mecha-Streisand". Stone said although "Mr. Hankey, the Christmas Poo" has become less shocking with time, viewers at the time of the episode's original broadcast were shocked, and some were horrified, at the idea of a living and speaking Christmas stool. "Mr. Hankey, the Christmas Poo" was the fourth-highest overall basic cable entertainment program of 1997. In its original American broadcast, the episode received a Nielsen Rating of 5.4, meaning the episode was seen by about 4.5 million households. The rating was the highest yet for South Park, and was more than seven times the Comedy Central prime-time average. The episode also earned a 51 share of the male demographic aged between 18 and 24; a share represents the percentage of households using a television at the time the program is airing.

"Mr. Hankey, the Christmas Poo" has been described as one of the classic episodes of South Park. Chris Vognar of The Dallas Morning News described Mr. Hankey himself as "the most outrageous character yet on TV's most outrageous show". Charlie Patton of The Florida Times-Union said the episode was "crude, nasty, irreverent and generally offensive—also extremely funny". He also said of the Mr. Hankey character, "If you're the sort of person who didn't care for that scene in Trainspotting where the Ewan McGregor character dove down the toilet and into the sewer in pursuit of his lost suppository, the whole Mr. Hankey subplot is going to be deeply disturbing." Doug Pratt, a DVD reviewer and Rolling Stone contributor, said, "Technically, the Christmas episode might well be the show's best effort, artistically, because it tackles the PC-ification of Christmas head-on, and also has an interesting psychological subtext: does the hero actually see Mr. Hankey, or does he have some serious psychological problems?" Diane Werts of Newsday said of the episode, "It's gross. It's yucky. It's probably offensive. It's also possibly the funniest holiday episode anybody's airing this year." Werts particularly praised the song "A Lonely Jew on Christmas". Jeffrey Andrew Weinstock, author of Taking South Park Seriously, said, "This episode arguably pushes the boundaries of what is acceptable, both for Christmas specials and television in general, farther than any previous one." Weinstock said this was particularly true of the episode's fake live-action commercial.

Before the episode was released, Debbie Liebling, then-Comedy Central vice president of development and production, described the episode as "adorably offensive". Alan Sepinwall of The Star-Ledger called the episode "a brilliant skewering" of political correctness and over-sensitivity, and called it "at once hilariously satiric and extraordinarily foul." Sepinwall also added Mr. Hankey to his 1997 list of most memorable TV moments, describing the character as the year's "most disturbing cartoon image" and as "a mythical holiday creature so bizarre and offensive it literally cannot be described in a family newspaper". Matt Roush of USA Today praised the episode, which he described as "ribald, raunchy and riotous". A.J. Jacobs of Entertainment Weekly said in January 1998 that the episode was "already infamous". Jacobs also said Mr. Hankey was so popular, he half-jokingly suggested Matt Stone and Trey Parker pursue a spin-off revolving around the character.

The music in "Mr. Hankey, the Christmas Poo" was also praised. "A Lonely Jew on Christmas" has been described as a "classic song", and "Kyle's Mom is a Big Fat Bitch", which reviewers described as one of Cartman's trademarks, was included in the 1999 South Park film, South Park: Bigger, Longer & Uncut. Not all reviews of "Mr. Hankey, the Christmas Poo" were positive. Rick Marin of Newsweek described the episode as "simply one long potty joke". Virginia Rohan of The Record said she liked Kyle's song and some of Kenny's antics, but that the episode was not as funny as The Spirit of Christmas shorts. Rohan said South Park "can be brilliantly over the edge, but often tonight, it sorely needs a comic bungee cord".

In 2003, the Chicago-based RedEye ranked "Mr. Hankey, the Christmas Poo" the greatest South Park episode. In October 2004, the Comedy Central website held a poll to determine the top 27 South Park episodes for a television marathon; "Mr Hankey, the Christmas Poo" came third, just behind "Good Times with Weapons" at #2 and "Fat Butt and Pancake Head" at #1. South Park Studios, the official South Park website, listed "Mr. Hankey, the Christmas Poo" at number four on its list of the Five Most Notorious Episodes.

=== Ren & Stimpy controversy ===
John Kricfalusi, the creator of The Ren & Stimpy Show, claimed the Mr. Hankey concept was stolen from his cartoon short, "Nutty the Friendly Dump", which was part of a cartoon book series viewable online. Kricfalusi even confirmed that he pitched the idea for an animated series of "Nutty the Friendly Dump" to Comedy Central, who turned it down. Kricfalusi said after the show aired, "I got nine or ten messages from friends screaming, 'I can't believe this! They totally stole your story!' ... This idea of [feces] singing or dancing and being friends, well, that is my idea." Kricfalusi said he felt other elements of South Park were lifted from his work, and he told media outlets his company Spümcø was contemplating taking legal action against Parker and Stone. Comedy Central spokesman Tony Fox said Stone and Parker were not familiar with "Nutty the Friendly Dump" and that the claim was "ludicrous". Parker said he had never seen more than half an episode of Ren & Stimpy, which he said he did not enjoy because the characters were too over-the-top and the voice acting was too annoying. Parker said Kricfalusi eventually contacted the South Park creators, "He wrote a letter back saying, 'Oh, OK, I see how it could just be a coincidence, but you should just admit to the press that you're a big Ren and Stimpy fan.' – I'm not a Ren and Stimpy fan."
