= Cow Days =

- South Park episode
- Episode no.: Season 2 Episode 13
- Directed by: Trey Parker
- Written by: Trey Parker; David Goodman
- Production code: 213
- Original air date: September 30, 1998

Guest appearance
- Dian Bachar as the Cow Days' announcer

Episode chronology
← Previous "Clubhouses"	Next → "Chef Aid"
- South Park season 2

"Cow Days" is the thirteenth episode of the second season of the American animated television series South Park. The 26th episode of the series overall, it originally aired on Comedy Central in the United States on September 30, 1998. The episode was written by series co-creator Trey Parker, along with David Goodman, and directed by Parker. Dian Bachar makes a guest appearance. In the episode, the town of South Park holds a festival known as "Cow Days".

== Plot ==
A couple named Tom and Mary win a trip to South Park for the "Cow Days" festival from a game show called "What the Hell is That", also known as "WTHIT", although they were expecting something more extravagant. Stan, Kyle, Kenny, and Cartman are at the festival, but find it less than satisfactory. They find something enjoyable in a ball-throwing game featuring a photo of Jennifer Love Hewitt that allows them the chance to win a pair of (crudely made) Terrance and Phillip dolls, but the game is fixed and cannot be won. Kyle attempts to bring Officer Barbrady's attention to the rigged game, but his last throw is successful when the carny discreetly switches the balls. Once Barbrady is gone, the carny tells them they have to win seven times to get the dolls. They decide to enter Cartman (who earlier wasted their money on terrible rides) in the bull-riding contest in the rodeo to try to win $5,000, enough money to play until they get the dolls.

Meanwhile, all the cows in the town discover the festival's symbol, a Buddha-shaped clock with the head of a cow which moos every hour, and carry it off to start their own cult. Tom and Mary are accused of stealing the clock and are thrown in jail. The townspeople later find the cows and confront them, before witnessing them commit mass suicide. During practice for the bull-riding contest, Cartman hits his head and believes himself to be a Vietnamese prostitute named Ming Li. The boys enter him in the contest anyway and he wins the grand prize; Kenny is killed when a bull's horn stabs him through his head.

The carny decides to just let the boys buy the dolls with their $5,000 that Cartman won rather than having them play for them. The boys discover that the dolls aren’t authentic but cheap rip-offs. Kyle calls back Barbrady, making everyone else realize how lame the carnival is, leading to town rioting and the carnies being arrested. In the meantime, Tom and Mary are forgotten and starve to death in prison. A plan to cover up the deaths is arranged; everyone is instructed to claim that the couple never arrived in South Park, thus ending the Cow Days Festival.

Cartman's memory returns overnight. The next day he tells Stan and Kyle (who still have the dolls and are playing with them) about his "weird dream" involving being a Vietnamese prostitute, riding a bull, and being spanked by Leonardo DiCaprio. Upon seeing the dolls, he becomes upset that what happened was true, especially after DiCaprio's limo pulls up and he thanks him for last night; Stan and Kyle laugh as Cartman utters "Son of a bitch!"

== Home media ==
All 18 episodes of the second season, including "Cow Days", were released on a DVD box set on June 3, 2003.
