= Tom's Rhinoplasty =

- South Park episode
- Episode no.: Season 1 Episode 11
- Directed by: Trey Parker (uncredited)
- Written by: Trey Parker
- Production code: 111
- Original air date: February 11, 1998

Guest appearance
- Natasha Henstridge as Ms. Ellen (credited as "The Chick from Species")

Episode chronology
← Previous "Damien"	Next → "Mecha-Streisand"
- South Park season 1

"Tom's Rhinoplasty" is the eleventh episode of the first season of the American animated television series South Park. It originally aired on Comedy Central in the United States on February 11, 1998. In the episode, Stan Marsh, Kyle Broflovski, Eric Cartman, and Kenny McCormick become infatuated with the new substitute teacher Ms. Ellen, which highly aggravates Stan's girlfriend Wendy Testaburger. Meanwhile, Mr. Garrison gets a nose job that makes him resemble actor David Hasselhoff.

"Tom's Rhinoplasty" was the first Valentine's Day-themed episode of the series and was written by series co-creator Trey Parker. The episode advocates the concept of inner beauty through the Mr. Garrison subplot, and shows the boys' efforts to win Ms. Ellen's affection despite the fact that she is a lesbian.

Natasha Henstridge makes a guest appearance as Ms. Ellen, marking the first time a celebrity guest played a major role in a South Park episode. She is credited as "The Chick from Species" in the opening credits. The episode marked the first time a real photographic image of a person's head (in this case David Hasselhoff) was superimposed over a cartoon body, a practice which would become common throughout the series.

"Tom's Rhinoplasty" introduced the song "No Substitute", which was sung by Chef and was later included on Chef Aid: The South Park Album. Trey Parker and Matt Stone said they were initially unhappy with "Tom's Rhinoplasty" when production of the episode concluded, and were surprised when fans responded positively to it.

== Plot ==
Valentine's Day approaches, and Wendy Testaburger suggests to her boyfriend Stan Marsh ways to spend time together. However, when their schoolteacher Mr. Garrison decides to get a rhinoplasty, a new substitute arrives named Ms. Ellen (Natasha Henstridge). Stan, Kyle Broflovski, Eric Cartman, and Kenny McCormick all fall in love with her. Wendy becomes incredibly jealous and warns Ms. Ellen to stay away from Stan, unaware that the substitute teacher does not return Stan's affection.

Concerned about the children's education, Ms. Ellen reveals she will buy dinner for the winner of a spelling test. The boys actively try to court Ms. Ellen, but Chef (having beaten them to it) warns them she is a lesbian and thus only likes other lesbians. The boys do not realize what this means and try in vain to become lesbians in order to attract Ms. Ellen, but misinterpret what others tell them about lesbianism - for example, Cartman, when told by his mother that lesbians "lick carpet", resorts to literally licking the carpet on the floor of his house.

Meanwhile, Mr. Garrison's nose job makes him a "hot and sexy" man, with his face resembling David Hasselhoff, and he decides to quit teaching to pursue women. Stan wins the dinner (much to Wendy's dismay), but finds out that Ms. Ellen has no intention of making love with him. Wendy however sees them through the window and leaves distraught. The next day, several Iraqi men burst into the classroom and declare that Ms. Ellen is actually an Iraqi fugitive, a traitor to the state, and a murderer using a false identity and her real name is "Maqesh Alaq Makaraqesh". Protesting her innocence, she resists arrest and inadvertently kills Kenny in the process by impaling him with a sword to his face. The soldiers take her into custody and shoot her into the center of the Sun via a rocket.

Mr. Garrison becomes a successful model, but he soon finds himself being chased throughout the streets by a large group of women attracted to him. Frightened by all the attention, Mr. Garrison decides to return to his normal looks. Wendy reclaims Stan as her boyfriend after he vomits on her. Despite Ms. Ellen's arrest, Cartman is still trying to become a lesbian by "chowing on [a] box" - that is, literally eating a cardboard box.

Later, Kyle goes to Wendy's house, where a party is occurring. Wendy thanks two of the women in the mob that chased Mr. Garrison, for getting him back as teacher. Wendy then speaks with the Iraqi men in fluent Arabic and pays them with a wad of American money. Later, Wendy watches joyfully as the rocket blows up in the Sun, and Kyle realizes Wendy orchestrated this entire series of events, including hiring the Iraqis to kill Ms. Ellen. Kyle angrily condemns Wendy for this, but she declares (with deranged eyes), "I told her: 'Don't... fuck... with... Wendy... Testaburger!'" Kyle looks shocked, says nothing further, and then the credits roll.

== Production ==
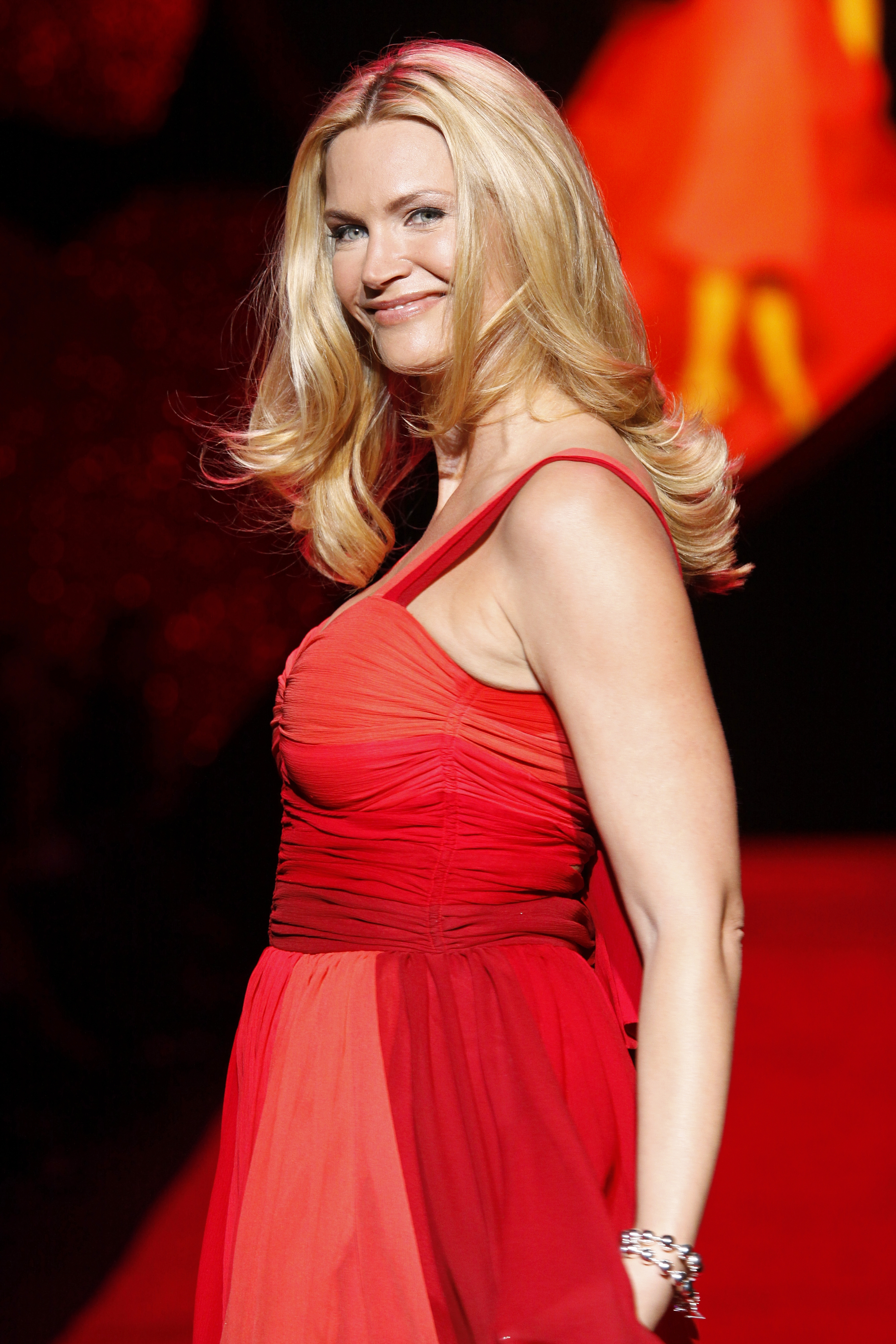
Natasha Henstridge (pictured) was cast as Ms. Ellen solely because Trey Parker found her attractive in the 1995 science-fiction horror film Species

"Tom's Rhinoplasty" was written and directed by South Park co-creator Trey Parker. It first aired on Comedy Central in the United States on February 11, 1998. It is considered the show's first Valentine's Day episode, since it came out three days before Valentine's Day and involved semi-romantic plot-lines. Natasha Henstridge makes a guest appearance as substitute teacher Ms. Ellen. Following the success of "Mr. Hankey, the Christmas Poo", a large number of celebrities started contacting Comedy Central with the hopes of making guest appearances in South Park episodes, allowing Parker and fellow co-creator Matt Stone to practically take their pick of guest stars. Parker asked for Henstridge solely because he found her attractive in Species, the 1995 science fiction horror film in which she starred. Henstridge was nervous performing the role because she had never conducted a voice over performance before. Henstridge was credited as "The Chick from Species" in the opening credits.

"Tom's Rhinoplasty" marked the first time a real photographic image of a person's head (in this case David Hasselhoff) was superimposed over a cartoon body, a practice which would become common throughout the series. Parker said the technology was not previously available in the earliest episodes of the series. Comedy Central was required to pay royalties to the photographer of the picture used for Hasselhoff's head, but was not required to pay Hasselhoff himself. "Tom's Rhinoplasty" displayed noticeable differences in South Park's animation, which was gradually changing throughout the first season and settling into the defined look the series has maintained throughout the years. One of the exterior scenes in "Tom's Rhinoplasty" featured the first perspective angle of a street, which were previously only shown sideways or straight angles. Additionally, the simulated rain during a scene with Wendy watching Ms. Ellen and Stan from outside a restaurant was far more sophisticated than any such animation in previous episodes.

Chef sings a song called "No Substitute" to Ms. Ellen in an attempt to woo her. The brief song was later expanded and included in Chef Aid: The South Park Album, a South Park soundtrack released in 1998. "No Substitute" was performed by Chef's voice actor Isaac Hayes and was written by Parker, Stone and Bruce Howell, a South Park composer and producer. During one montage scene in "Tom's Rhinoplasty", a jealous Wendy recalls memories of her relationship with Stan while a sad song plays in the background. The song is performed by actress Courtney Ford, who appeared as an extra in the 1998 comedy film BASEketball, which starred Parker and Stone. Like Henstridge, Parker asked Ford to appear in the episode because he found her attractive. The Indigo Girls-style song in "Tom's Rhinoplasty" was written and sung by Toddy Walters, who played protagonist Polly Pry in Trey Parker's 1996 film, Cannibal! The Musical. The song is called "I Love Domestic Chores", and was written "as sort of a lesbian anthem".

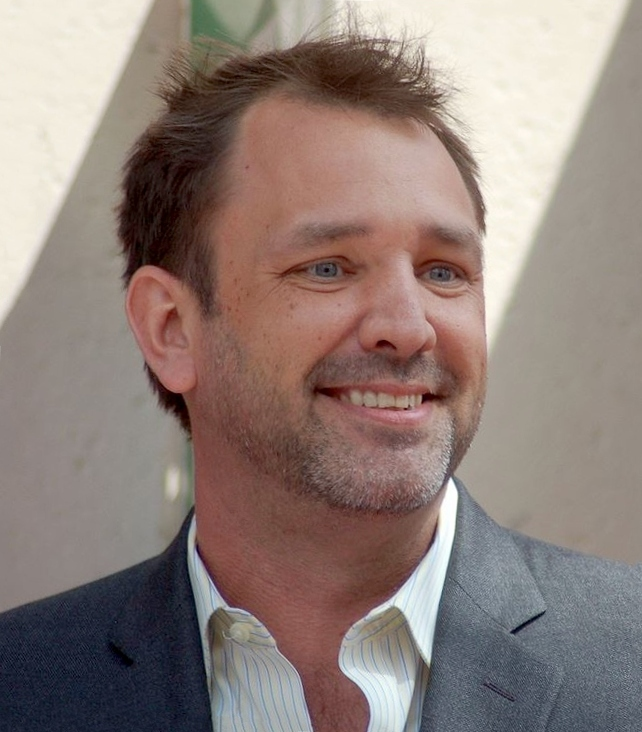
South Park co-creator Trey Parker wrote "Tom's Rhinoplasty"

During one scene, Wendy tells Stan that she smelled Ms. Ellen taking a "smelly dump" in the bathroom in an attempt to make him less attracted to her. In the original script, Wendy originally told Stan that she had a yeast infection, but Comedy Central censors made Parker and Stone change the line. Parker and Stone said although the network typically provides great leniency in permitting obscene jokes, they often object to lines about female hygiene problems. During a cafeteria scene, a boy visible at a lunch table in the background looks exactly like Craig Tucker, but the color of his hat has been changed to make him appear to be a different character. The idea of Ms. Ellen taking one of the children to dinner came from Parker's real-life experiences. At his school, the children were able to have lunch with the teacher and principal if they were awarded "Student of the Week". Parker said he went on one of the lunches once and found the experience "really, really creepy" because he had the impression the teacher and principal were having a romantic affair.

Parker and Stone had trouble deciding how to end "Tom's Rhinoplasty" in a way that would bring everything back to normal in South Park. Originally, the episode ended with Ms. Ellen being taken away by the Iraqi soldiers, leaving the impression that she was in fact an Iraqi fugitive. They ultimately decided this was a poor way to end the show, so they recast the ending to make Ms. Ellen an innocent woman who was framed by Wendy. Parker and Stone also struggled with how to make Mr. Garrison decide he wanted his old nose back. It was only a few days before the episode aired that these final decisions about the ending were made.

== Theme ==
Describing the general tone of the show, Teri Fitsell of The New Zealand Herald explains that "South Park is a vicious social satire that works by spotlighting not the immorality of these kids but their amorality, and contrasting it with the conniving hypocrisy of the adults who surround them." The humor of the show comes from the disparity between the cute appearance of the characters and their crude behavior. However, Parker and Stone said in an early interview that the show's language is realistic. "There are so many shows where little kids are good and sweet, and it's just not real ... Don't people remember what they were like in third grade? We were little bastards."

"Tom's Rhinoplasty" in general advocates the concept of inner beauty by showing how miserable Mr. Garrison becomes after having his nose job. As a model, he feels burnt out and becomes a heroin addict who only finds happiness once he sheds his new outer image and becomes his old self. The episode also demonstrates the lack of understanding many have about the gay community by portraying the characters as seeking to become lesbians in order to win Ms. Ellen's affection, even though they do not know what a lesbian is.

== Cultural references and impact ==
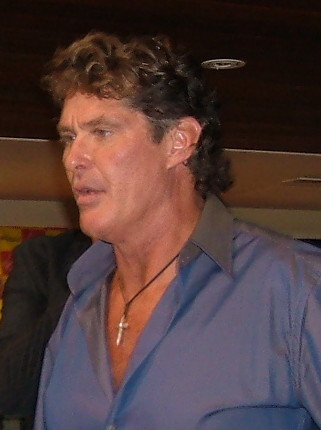
David Hasselhoff was the first celebrity whose head was used on the body of an animated South Park character.

After Mr. Garrison gets a nose job, his face resembles that of David Hasselhoff, an actor and singer who starred in the series Knight Rider and Baywatch. Mr. Garrison refers disparagingly to the 1997 science fiction drama film Contact. Parker and Stone said they went out of their way to include the reference due to their own strong distaste for the film.

The song that plays when Mr. Garrison strolls down the street after his nose job is "Shadow Dancing" by Andy Gibb. When Chef tries to determine how attractive Ms. Ellen is, he asks the boys how she compares various celebrities, including Vanessa L. Williams, Toni Braxton, Pamela Anderson, and Erin Gray. For the lattermost actress, he specifically asks if Ms. Ellen is as attractive as Gray was in the second season of the NBC series Buck Rogers in the 25th Century. When Ms. Ellen asks the class about the last lesson Mr. Garrison taught them, Cartman said they had been learning about how actress Yasmine Bleeth was dating Richard Grieco, the star of television series 21 Jump Street and Booker.

The store Tom's Rhinoplasty first appeared in the background of the short Jesus vs. Santa; it is regularly shown in the background throughout the rest of the series, as well as in the 1999 South Park film, South Park: Bigger, Longer & Uncut. A South Park drinking game included in the book "The Complete Guide to Television and Movie Drinking" encourages viewers to drink whenever South Park residents walk by or gather in front of the Tom's Rhinoplasty building.

== Release and reception ==
When production of "Tom's Rhinoplasty" ended, Parker and Stone were dissatisfied with the final product and believed audiences would hate it, but were surprised to receive largely positive feedback from fans, some of whom described it as their favorite of the latter half of the season. "Tom's Rhinoplasty" has been described as one of the classic episodes of South Park. In 2003, the Chicago Tribune listed it among the top 10 episodes of the series. Walt Belcher of The Tampa Tribune praised the episode and said it "celebrates Valentine's Day [as] only the Comedy Central series can", although he warned it was not for children. During a brief scene in "Tom's Rhinoplasty", Mr. Garrison leans against a mailbox with a United States Postal Service logo printed on the side. The Postal Service contacted Comedy Central after the episode aired and threatened legal action if the logo was used again without permission.

"Tom's Rhinoplasty" was released, along with 11 other episodes, in a three-disc DVD set in November 1998. It was included in the third volume, which also included the episodes "Starvin' Marvin", "Mr. Hankey, the Christmas Poo" and "Mecha-Streisand". The DVD commentary recorded by Parker and Stone for "Tom's Rhinoplasty" has been named as one of the primary reasons the commentaries were not included in the South Park Season One DVD release. Warner Bros., which released the DVD set, refused to include the commentaries due to "standards" issues with some of the statements unless Parker and Stone allowed the tracks to be edited, which they refused. Media outlets said the commentary that most bothered Warner Bros. executives was the one for "Tom's Rhinoplasty", in which Parker and Stone say they agree with Mr. Garrison's character that the 1997 film Contact (also released by Warner Bros.) was "terrible". The commentaries were ultimately released on CD separately from the DVDs.
