= South Park season 2 =

Season of television series

South Park
- Season 2
- Home media release cover
- No. of episodes: 18

Release
- Original network: Comedy Central
- Original release: April 1, 1998 – January 20, 1999

Season chronology
- ← Previous; Season 1 Next → Season 3

The second season of South Park, an American animated television series created by Trey Parker and Matt Stone, began airing on April 1, 1998. The second season concluded after 18 episodes on January 20, 1999; it remains the longest season of South Park to date. Almost all the episodes were directed by series co-creator Trey Parker, with the exception of two episodes directed by Eric Stough.

== Broadcast ==
The first season of the show concluded with the episode "Cartman's Mom Is a Dirty Slut", broadcast on Comedy Central in the United States on February 25, 1998, and had a cliffhanger ending regarding the identity of Cartman's father. The episode scheduled for April 1, 1998 promised to resolve the mystery, but was in fact an April Fools' Day joke on the creators' part: "Terrance and Phillip in Not Without My Anus", an entire episode revolving around the two title characters. The April 1 episode was supposed to be a one-off, with the rest of the season starting in May. However, following overwhelmingly negative fan reaction, the episode resolving the Cartman's father storyline, "Cartman's Mom Is Still a Dirty Slut", was moved from its planned May 20 air date to April 22. "Ike's Wee Wee" then started a six-episode weekly run of the season when it was broadcast on May 20.

The show went on a summer break for a month and a half, and returned for another six-episode run on August 19, with the episode "Chef's Chocolate Salty Balls". The next installment came after a three-week break, with the Halloween episode "Spookyfish", which aired on October 28. The next two episodes were "Merry Christmas, Charlie Manson!" and "Gnomes", airing on December 9 and 16 respectively. The final episode of the season, "Prehistoric Ice Man" aired after five weeks of hiatus, on January 20, 1999. The third season then started a few months later, in April 1999.

== Voice cast ==
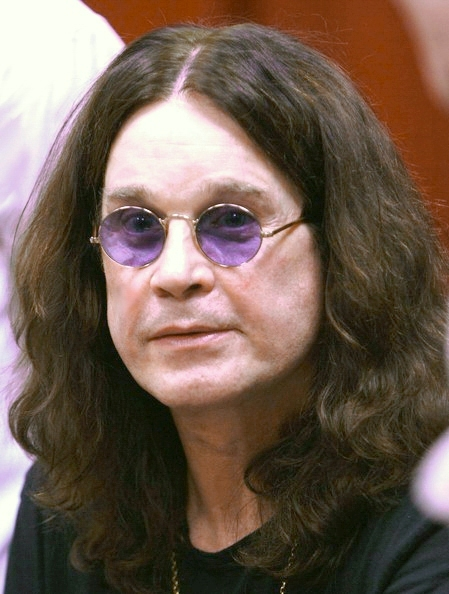
Ozzy Osbourne (pictured in 2010) was one of the many musicians to make a guest appearance in "Chef Aid"

=== Main cast ===
- Trey Parker as Stan Marsh, Eric Cartman, Randy Marsh, Mr. Garrison, Clyde Donovan, Mr. Hankey, Mr. Mackey, and Phillip
- Matt Stone as Kyle Broflovski, Kenny McCormick, Butters Stotch, Gerald Broflovski, Stuart McCormick, Pip Pirrup, Jimbo Kern, Terrance, Tweek Tweak and Jesus
- Mary Kay Bergman as Liane Cartman, Sheila Broflovski, Shelly Marsh, Sharon Marsh, Mrs. McCormick, Ms Crabtree, and Wendy Testaburger
- Isaac Hayes as Chef

=== Guest cast ===
- Henry Winkler as Fonzie and the Kid-Eating Monster ("City on the Edge of Forever")
- Jay Leno as himself ("City on the Edge of Forever")
- Brent Musburger as Scuzzlebutt's leg ("City on the Edge of Forever")
- Jonathan Katz as Dr. Katz ("Summer Sucks")
- Dian Bachar as the Cow Days' announcer ("Cow Days")

Multiple musicians and bands made guest appearances in the episode "Chef Aid". These include:

- Devo
- DMX
- Rick James
- Elton John
- Meat Loaf
- Ozzy Osbourne
- Primus
- Rancid
- Joe Strummer
- Ween

== Episodes ==
No. overall	No. in season	Title	Directed by	Written by	Original release date	Prod. code	U.S. viewers (millions)
14	1	"Terrance and Phillip in Not Without My Anus"	Trey Parker	Trisha Nixon & Trey Parker	April 1, 1998	201	5.55 3.25 (HH) (Note: (HH) denotes that the numbers listed are the amount of households the episode was viewed in.)
Terrance and Phillip travel to Iran to rescue Terrance's daughter, Sally, who is being held prisoner by Iranian police. A complex chain of events involving a female pop vocalist, a Middle Eastern dictator, and chemical warfare leads to a hostile takeover of Canada. Terrance and Phillip attempt to save Sally and their home country.
15	2	"Cartman's Mom Is Still a Dirty Slut"	Trey Parker	David Goodman & Trey Parker	April 22, 1998	202	6.20 4.00 (HH)
Just as the genetic engineer Mephesto is about to reveal the identity of Eric Cartman's father, he is shot by a mysterious gunman who goes on the run. Cartman attempts to resume his quest to find his real father, but his true identity remains unknown. Meanwhile, Stan, Kyle, and Kenny have trouble at home.
16	3	"Ike's Wee Wee"	Trey Parker	Trey Parker	May 20, 1998	204	4.89 2.95 (HH)
After a mishap in the classroom during his lesson on the evils of drugs and alcohol, the school counselor, Mr. Mackey, is fired. Meanwhile, it's time for Ike's bris, and when Kyle and the boys find out what it means to be circumcised, they try to save Ike from his fate. In the process, they discover a strange truth behind Ike's origins.
17	4	"Chickenlover"	Trey Parker	Trey Parker, Matt Stone & David Goodman	May 27, 1998	203	4.56 2.71 (HH)
A series of heinous crimes involving chickens leads to a startling revelation— Officer Barbrady cannot read. When Barbrady resigns and chaos ensues, the mayor orders Barbrady to go back to school, and he promotes the boys to deputies to assist him. Meanwhile, Cartman brings his own brand of law to the streets of South Park.
18	5	"Conjoined Fetus Lady"	Trey Parker	Trey Parker, Matt Stone & David Goodman	June 3, 1998	205	3.95 2.57 (HH)
With Pip as their star player, the South Park dodgeball team is off to the championships. Back in town, the local citizens declare a "Conjoined Twin Myslexia Awareness Week" in a misguided attempt to help the school nurse deal with a strange medical disorder.
19	6	"The Mexican Staring Frog of Southern Sri Lanka"	Trey Parker	Trey Parker & Matt Stone	June 10, 1998	206	4.16 2.57 (HH)
The boys get back at Jimbo and Ned for telling a false story about being in the Vietnam War. Meanwhile, a producer tries to reinvent Jesus and Pals to save it from low ratings and a potential cancellation.
20	7	"City on the Edge of Forever" "Flashbacks"	Trey Parker	Trey Parker & Nancy M. Pimental	June 17, 1998	207	4.80 3.06 (HH)
In this clip show episode, Ms. Crabtree becomes a famous stand-up comedian while the South Park kids reminisce on all their adventures while they are stuck on a bus on the edge of a cliff.
21	8	"Summer Sucks"	Trey Parker	Nancy M. Pimental & Trey Parker	June 24, 1998	208	3.87 2.53 (HH)
The town bans fireworks after a North Park kid gets injured and must come up with an alternative for their Fourth of July celebration. Meanwhile, Mr. Garrison loses Mr. Hat to Brett Favre, and Cartman struggles with swimming lessons in a pool full of urinating first graders.
22	9	"Chef's Chocolate Salty Balls"	Trey Parker	Trey Parker, Matt Stone & Nancy M. Pimental	August 19, 1998	209	5.27 3.26 (HH)
A film festival from Los Angeles comes to South Park and corrupts it with their lack of culture. Meanwhile, Kyle tries to save Mr. Hankey from dying, and Chef tries to cash in on the festival by selling his suggestively named treats, "Chocolate Salty Balls."
23	10	"Chickenpox"	Trey Parker	Trey Parker, Matt Stone & Trisha Nixon	August 26, 1998	210	4.99 3.07 (HH)
The boys' mothers force their children to hang out with Kenny so they can get chickenpox. Meanwhile, Kyle's mom tries to patch up the long-broken relationship between her husband and Kenny's dad.
24	11	"Roger Ebert Should Lay Off the Fatty Foods"	Trey Parker	Trey Parker & David Goodman	September 2, 1998	211	4.09 2.56 (HH)
The town is brainwashed by the curator of a planetarium. Meanwhile, Cartman auditions for a new Cheesy Poofs commercial.
25	12	"Clubhouses"	Trey Parker	Trey Parker & Nancy M. Pimental	September 23, 1998	212	3.49 2.57 (HH)
The boys create a clubhouse so they can get girls to play "Truth or Dare". Meanwhile, Stan's parents get a divorce.
26	13	"Cow Days"	Trey Parker	Trey Parker & David Goodman	September 30, 1998	213	3.42 2.59 (HH)
A couple wins a vacation to South Park on a game show, and they arrive when the town is celebrating the 14th Annual Cow Days festival. While there, the boys try to win Terrence and Phillip dolls, and for part of their plan, Kyle enters Cartman in a bull riding contest.
27	14	"Chef Aid"	Trey Parker	Trey Parker & Matt Stone	October 7, 1998	214	3.21 2.13 (HH)
When Chef is sued for pointing out that Alanis Morissette's new song is actually a song he wrote years ago, the boys hire Chef's famous musician friends to raise money. Meanwhile, Mr. Garrison suspects Mr. Hat of several attempts on Mr. Twig's life.
28	15	"Spookyfish"	Trey Parker	Trey Parker	October 28, 1998	215	4.91 3.11 (HH)
Beings from a parallel universe come to South Park, including such creatures as a nice version of Eric Cartman and a killer goldfish.
29	16	"Merry Christmas, Charlie Manson!"	Eric Stough	Trey Parker & Nancy M. Pimental	December 9, 1998	216	3.28
When Stan's parents forbid their son from going to Cartman's relatives in Nebraska, which is far away from South Park, Stan sneaks out to join the other boys and go there for a visit. Cartman's uncle and Charles Manson break out of prison to kidnap the kids, and Stan's parents set out to find their son and punish him for going there. Eventually, Manson comes to understand the true meaning of Christmas.
30	17	"Gnomes"	Trey Parker	Pam Brady, Trey Parker & Matt Stone	December 16, 1998	217	3.01 2.06 (HH)
The boys are forced to write a current events paper to save Mr. Garrison's job. Stan, Kyle, Cartman, and Kenny are grouped with Tweek, a jittery child who suggests that the presentation be on the "Underpants Gnomes" — tiny men who sneak into his house and steal his underwear. Meanwhile, a local cafe, operated by Tweek's parents, is being threatened by a retail chain coffee shop.
31	18	"Prehistoric Ice Man"	Eric Stough	Trey Parker & Nancy M. Pimental	January 20, 1999	218	3.60 2.37 (HH)
Together, Stan and Kyle discover a man who has been trapped in ice since 1996, but they argue when they assign him different names. Meanwhile, the "ice man" tries to reconnect with his wife and kids.

== Home media ==
Special Features

- Introductions by Trey Parker and Matt Stone in 12 episodes.
- Documentary: "Goin' Down to South Park"
- "Chocolate Salty Balls" music video
- Region 1 – June 3, 2003
- Region 2 – October 22, 2007
- Region 4 – October 4, 2007

== See also ==
- South Park (Park County, Colorado)
- South Park City
