= Roger Ebert Should Lay Off the Fatty Foods =

- South Park episode
- Episode no.: Season 2 Episode 11
- Directed by: Trey Parker
- Written by: Trey Parker; David Goodman
- Production code: 211
- Original air date: September 2, 1998

Episode chronology
← Previous "Chickenpox"	Next → "Clubhouses"
- South Park season 2

"Roger Ebert Should Lay Off the Fatty Foods" is the eleventh episode of the second season of the American animated television series South Park. The 24th episode of the series overall, it originally aired on Comedy Central in the United States on September 2, 1998. The episode was written by series co-creator Trey Parker, along with David Goodman, and directed by Parker. It spoofs the Star Trek episode "Dagger of the Mind". In the episode, the boys visit a planetarium; they soon discover that the operator has sinister intentions involving brainwashing. Meanwhile, Cartman auditions to sing on the Cheesy Poofs advertisement. The episode marks the first speaking role of Leopold "Butters" Stotch, who would become a major character on the show.

Despite the title, the episode has nothing to do with Roger Ebert (who had given Orgazmo and BASEketball negative reviews, despite being complimentary of the show South Park), aside from a brief joke about a fictional "Roger Ebert constellation" during the tour of the planetarium, and another joke, obscured by other characters speaking over it, comparing the hot gas that composes stars to "what comes out of Roger Ebert's mouth when he speaks".

== Plot ==
After getting tired of watching episodes of Barnaby Jones, the class wants to do school-related material for once. Mr. Garrison reveals that they will be going on a bus trip to the local planetarium. Once arriving, Cartman is tempted by a Cheesy Poofs truck parked outside, auditioning kids to sing the Cheesy Poofs song on their next television advertisement. The kids all think they will hate the planetarium, but after watching the star show, they want to go back again after the field trip. Not only do they go back, but they all also start volunteering to work at the planetarium. This turns out to be because the director, Dr. Adams, is using a brainwashing device on them. While doing so, he describes how stars are made up of hot gas, "which also comes out of Roger Ebert's mouth".

Cartman—having snuck out of the planetarium just before the brainwashing—sings the Cheesy Poofs song and gets selected for the audition; he advances further after cheating and browbeating his way past the other contestants, including one who is poor and in need of food. Cartman bursts into the classroom to tell his friends that he was selected to sing on the commercial, only to be confronted by Kyle as he creates an on-the-spot Haiku poem (which the children were studying at the time) about Cartman's chances. Kyle says "I bet you don't win, they don't let big fat asses, perform on TV" in perfect Haiku form, to which Mr. Garrison exclaims "Very good, Kyle!"; Cartman tries to retort in Haiku form, but fails. After the other audition finalists "unexpectedly" go to work at the planetarium, the judges reluctantly select Cartman to sing the Cheesy Poofs song on television. Despite numerous takes and interruptions and being edited to only say the last word in the song, Cartman is ecstatic after seeing himself on television.

Later, Stan and Kyle become concerned about the planetarium's star show. When they have Kenny go and witness the show while Stan and Kyle examine the controls, they casually increase the star projector's power, unexpectedly causing Kenny's head to explode. Horrified, Stan and Kyle tell Officer Barbrady what has happened; Barbrady is skeptical but accompanies them to question Dr. Adams. Because of this, Dr. Adams brainwashes Barbrady to believe that he is Elvis Presley; he then reveals his reason to brainwash people was to have them work at the planetarium because nobody finds planetariums interesting.

Meanwhile, school counselor Mr. Mackey and school nurse Nurse Gollum have learned of the mind control machine through an agitated child who earlier escaped the planetarium. They race to stop Dr. Adams, and a showdown occurs at the planetarium, with Stan, Kyle, Mr. Mackey, and Nurse Gollum against Dr. Adams and Barbrady. The boys, Mackey, and Nurse Gollum are quickly captured, tied down, and brainwashed into forgetting everything they found out.

However, in the middle of the process, Cartman, upon discovering the other boys missed his commercial, angrily kicks the star projector and proclaims that "Planetariums suck ass!". A full blast of the mind control machine gets sent into Dr. Adams' brain, rendering him as a mindless shell collapsed against a wall. Cartman is elated that he not only was on television but saved everyone as well. His mother appears and chastises him for picking his nose again (a running gag in the episode), to which he angrily shouts he wasn't picking because he had an itch.

== Home media ==
In 2000, this episode along with “Clubhouses” was released on VHS for Volume 12 of the South Park VHS collection. This tape also included bumpers of Trey & Matt’s fictional bacon themed cooking show & Comedy Central vignettes. All 18 episodes of the second season, including "Roger Ebert Should Lay Off the Fatty Foods", were released on a DVD box set on June 3, 2003.
