= Gnomes (South Park) =

- South Park episode
- Episode no.: Season 2 Episode 17
- Directed by: Trey Parker
- Written by: Pam Brady; Trey Parker; Matt Stone
- Production code: 217
- Original air date: December 16, 1998

Episode chronology
← Previous "Merry Christmas, Charlie Manson!"	Next → "Prehistoric Ice Man"
- South Park season 2

"Gnomes" is the seventeenth and penultimate episode of the second season of the American animated television series South Park. The 30th episode of the series overall, it originally aired on Comedy Central in the United States on December 16, 1998. The episode was written by series co-creators Trey Parker and Matt Stone, along with Pam Brady, and directed by Parker. This episode marks the first appearance of Tweek Tweak and his parents.

In the episode, Harbucks plans to enter the South Park coffee market, posing a threat to the local coffee business owners, the Tweak parents. Mr. Tweak, scheming to use the boys’ school report as a platform to fight Harbucks, convinces the boys to deliver their school report on the supposed threat corporatism poses to small businesses, moving the South Park community to take action against Harbucks.

"Gnomes" satirizes the common complaint that large corporations lack consciences and drive seemingly wholesome smaller independent companies out of business. The episode is also known for the nonsensical business plan that the gnomes of the title devise, whose three steps consist of:

1. Collect underpants
2. ?
3. Profit

which later became a common meme used to mock poorly-thought-out business and political strategies.

== Plot ==
"Underpants Gnomes Theme Song"
The song sung by the gnomes as they collect underwear throughout the episode. The melody comes from Les Aventures de Colargol.

Mr. Garrison's job is on the line because he does not teach anything relevant, so in an effort to save his job, he makes the class do oral presentations on a current event for the town committee. Stan Marsh, Kyle Broflovski, Eric Cartman, and Kenny are grouped together with Tweek Tweak, a jittery child. Tweek suggests that the presentation be about the "Underpants Gnomes", tiny gnomes that sneak into his house and steal his underpants. The boys agree to stay at Tweek's house to work on Mr. Garrison's homework assignment and to see if Underpants Gnomes exist.

Tweek's parents, who own a coffee shop, give the boys coffee to help them stay up. The boys drink too much coffee, and end up wired, bouncing off the walls of Tweek's bedroom rather than writing their report. Tweek claims the gnomes arrive at 3:30 a.m.; as the time approaches, the boys realize they have nothing to present. Tweek's father enters the room, offering the boys a propagandist speech against Harbucks, a national chain of coffee houses that is threatening his business. As he does this, the gnomes steal underpants from Tweek's dresser, but only Tweek notices them.

Much to Mr. Garrison's surprise, the town committee is so moved by the boys' presentation that they lobby Mayor McDaniels to pass a law against Harbucks. The mayor agrees to a so-called Prop 10, allowing the townspeople to vote on whether Harbucks may remain in South Park. Mr. Garrison, knowing that the boys did not write the first presentation, piles the pressure on, telling them they better follow through, or else Mr. Hat will do "horrible things" to them. After Cartman effortlessly turns the townspeople against Harbucks, it is revealed that the mayor expects the boys to do yet another presentation just before the vote. The boys, however, know nothing on the subject. As they are at their wits' end, they finally see Tweek's gnomes and ply them for information. At the gnomes' lair, the gnomes claim to be business experts and explain their three-phase business plan:

Gnomes' three-phase business plan

Phase 1: Collect underpants
Phase 2: ?
Phase 3: Profit

When the boys give their presentation for the vote, they do a report that is completely different from their previous piece. They now say, having spoken to the gnomes, that corporations are good, and are only big because of their great contributions to the world. While speaking, they admit that they did not write the previous paper, which causes Mr. Garrison to be carried away as he lashes out at the boys, telling them they have ruined his life for the last time. Mrs. Tweak applauds their honesty and admits to the same facts herself. She persuades the whole town to try Harbucks Coffee. When everybody does try it, they all agree that Harbucks coffee is better than Tweek's coffee, including Mr. Tweak, who accepts an offer to run the Harbucks shop. Meanwhile, the gnomes continue to steal underpants from the oblivious townspeople.

== Production ==
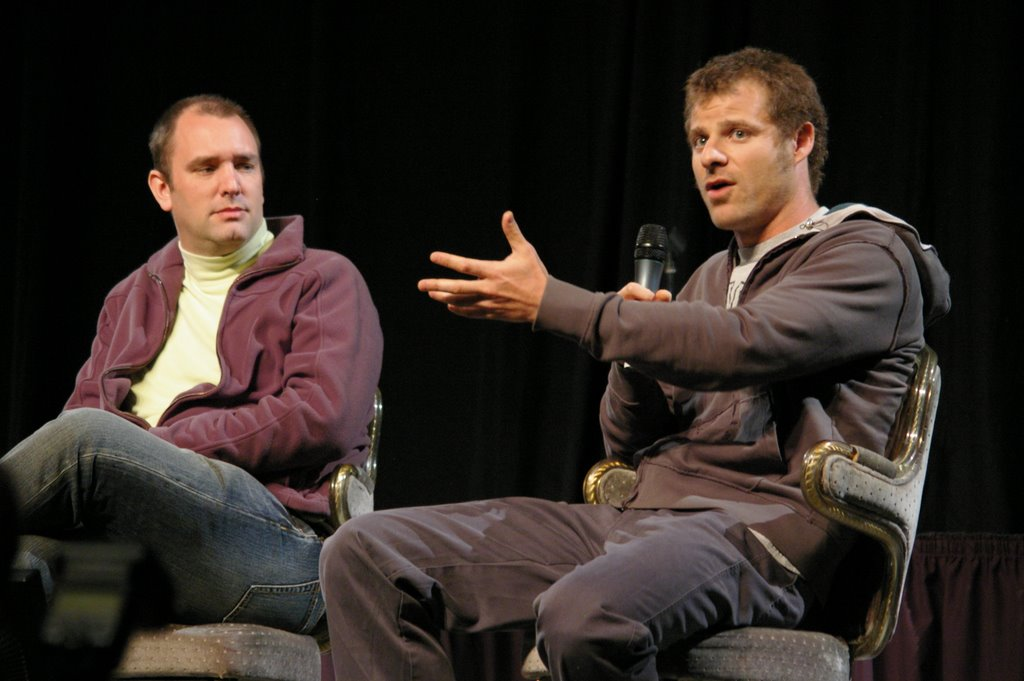
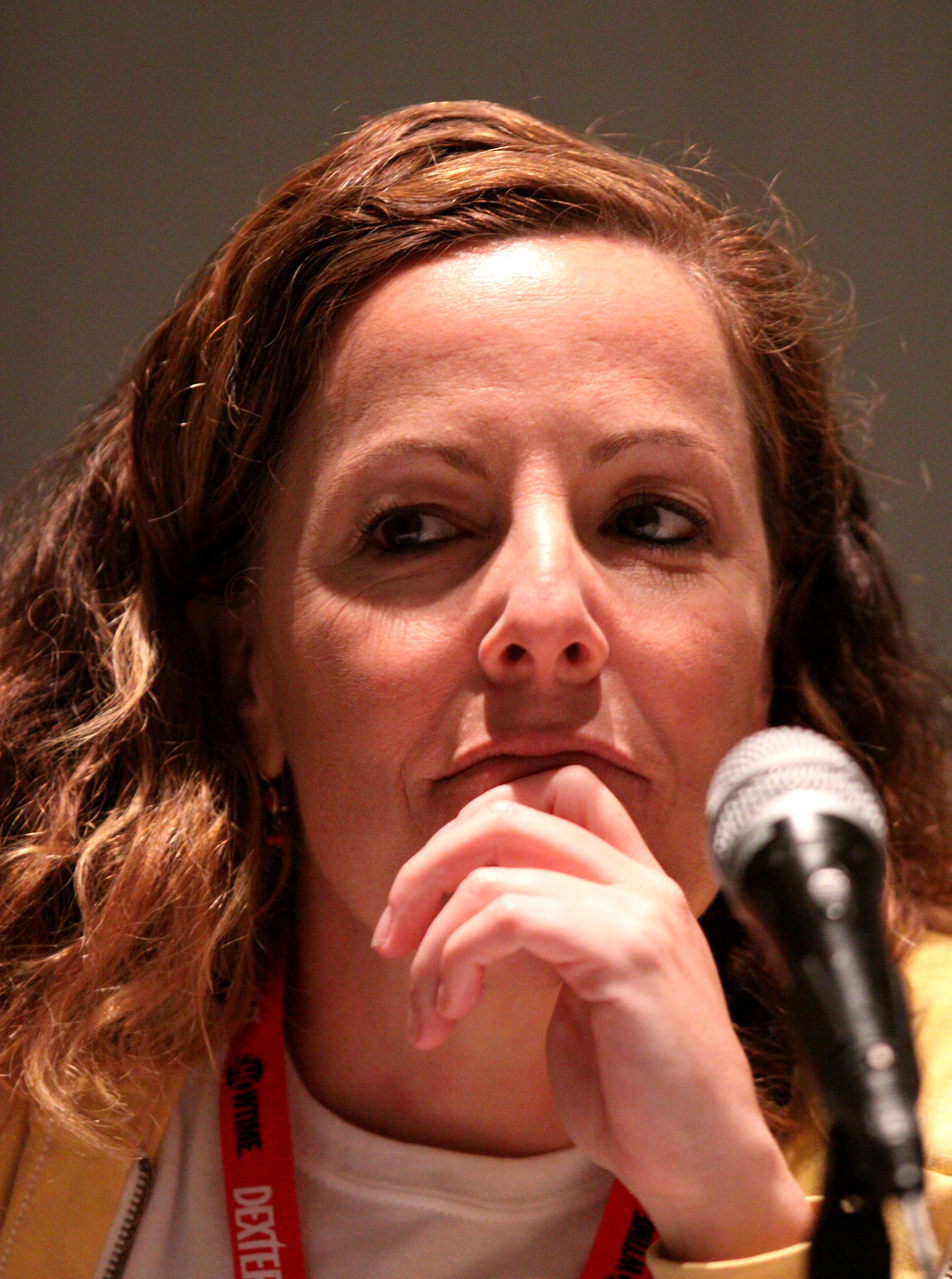
Series co-creators Trey Parker and Matt Stone (left and right in left picture, respectively), along with Pam Brady, wrote "Gnomes"

"Gnomes" was written by series co-creators Trey Parker and Matt Stone, along with Pam Brady, and directed by Parker. It is the seventeenth episode in the second season of South Park and the 30th episode of the series overall. It originally aired on Comedy Central in the United States on December 16, 1998. "Gnomes" marks the first appearance of Tweek Tweek and his parents.

== Theme ==
Contrary to the anti-corporate propaganda normally coming out of Hollywood, South Park argues that, in the absence of government intervention, corporations get where they are by serving the public, not by exploiting it.

— Paul Cantor

The episode satirizes the common complaint that large corporations lack scruples and drive seemingly wholesome smaller independent companies out of business. Paul Cantor, a literary critic and economic theorist who taught college courses revolving around the "Gnomes" episode, described it as "the most fully developed defense of capitalism" ever produced by the show. Cantor said the episode challenges the stereotype that small businesses are public servants who truly care about their customers by portraying local business owner Mr. Tweak as greedier and having fewer scruples than that of the corporation he is challenging; Tweek knowingly takes advantage of American distrust for big businesses and nostalgia for simpler times in his fight to maintain his bottom line. At the end of the episode, Kyle and Stan conclude big corporations are good because of the services they provide people, and uphold the notion that the businesses providing the best product deserve to succeed in the marketplace and grow to become larger.

== Cultural impact ==
Following the episode's release, the underpants gnomes, and particularly the business plan lacking a second stage between "Collect underpants" and "Profit", became an Internet meme and has been widely used by many journalists and business critics as a metaphor for failed, internet bubble-era business plans and ill-planned political goals. Cantor said "no episode of South Park I have taught has raised as much raw passion, indignation, and hostility among students as 'Gnomes' has. I'm not sure why, but I think it has something to do with the defensiveness of elitists confronted with their own elitism." In January 2013, when it was announced that Parker and Stone were opening a new production studio, Important Studios, both the pair and their investors were jokingly compared to the gnomes included in "Gnomes".

Elon Musk referenced the underpants gnomes' plan in his presentation on Mars conquest in September 2016.

Mark Painter compared the "plan lacking a second stage" of socialism between "capitalism creates alienated labor and pauperism" and "socialist revolution leading to world communist utopia" to the underpants gnomes in his History of The Twentieth Century podcast episode 271 "The Roots of Fascism" in which he compares and contrasts socialism, liberalism, conservatism and fascism.

== Cultural references ==
- The Harbucks company is a reference to Starbucks, one of the largest coffee house chain companies in the world.
- Gnomes are often associated with the world of finance. Several commentators suggested the gnomes in South Park could be a reference to the phrase Gnomes of Zurich, a disparaging term for Swiss bankers.

== Home media ==
All 18 episodes of the second season, including "Gnomes", were released on a DVD box set on June 3, 2003.

== Sources ==
- Cantor, Paul A. (December 2006). "The Invisible Gnomes and the Invisible Hand: South Park and Libertarian Philosophy". South Park and Philosophy: You Know, I Learned Something Today. Malden, Massachusetts: Blackwell Publishing. ISBN 1-4051-6160-4.
