= Commercialism =

Commercialism is the application of both manufacturing and consumption towards personal usage, or the practices, methods, aims, and distribution of products in a free market geared toward generating a profit. Commercialism can also refer, positively or negatively, to corporate domination. Commercialism is often closely associated with the corporate world and advertising, and often makes use of advancements in technology.

Commercialism can also be used in a negative connotation to refer to the possibility within open-market capitalism to exploit objects, people, or the environment for the purpose of private monetary gain. As such, the related term "commercialized" can be used in a negative fashion, implying that someone or something has been despoiled by commercial or monetary interests.

== See also ==
- Commerce
- Commecialization
- Anti-consumerism
- Consumerism
- Corporatocracy
- Festivus
