= Nancy Pimental =

Actress, screenwriter

- Born: Nancy Marie Pimental; May 31, 1965 (age 60); Boston, Massachusetts
- Other name: Nancy M. Pimental
- Occupations: Actress, writer
- Years active: 1998-2021

Nancy Marie Pimental (born May 31, 1965) is an American actress and film and television writer.

== Early life and education ==
Born in Boston, Massachusetts, and of Portuguese descent, Pimental graduated from Somerset High School in 1983 and Worcester Polytechnic Institute in 1987. At WPI, she was a member of the Phi Sigma Sigma sorority and completed a degree in chemical engineering.

== Career ==
From 1998 to 2001, Pimental was one of the writers of South Park. In 2002, she wrote the script for the film The Sweetest Thing, which has been described as "the forerunner to films like Bridesmaids and Girls Trip."

Replacing Jimmy Kimmel, she served as co-host of the Comedy Central game show Win Ben Stein's Money from 2000 to 2002.

In 2010, Pimental joined the staff of the Showtime dramedy Shameless (U.S. version) as a writer and producer, and later as an executive producer.

== Filmography ==
=== Actress ===
- Prey for Rock & Roll (2003)
- Dumb and Dumberer: When Harry Met Lloyd (2003)
- Dickie Roberts: Former Child Star (2003)
- The Sweetest Thing (Uncredited, 2002)

=== Writer ===
- The Mick (2017)
- Bad Girls (2012)
- Shameless (2011–2021)
- The Sweetest Thing (2002)
- South Park (25 episodes, 1998–2001)
