= List of mashup songs =

This article lists songs of the C vs D "mash-up" genre that are commercially available (as opposed to amateur bootlegs and remixes). As a rule, they combine the vocals of the first "component" song with the instrumental (plus additional vocals, on occasion) from the second. The commercially available version of the mash-ups that do not use the original performer's vocals have been noted. Further, songs marked with an asterisk (*) were released using only the first track's name. Also noted is the inclusion of any other element.

Key
†	Indicates single release
#	Indicates a song with vocals by performed by other artist(s)
‡	Indicates a song was released as a B-side single, but did not appear on any album
Non-album single	Indicates a song was released as a single, but did not appear on any album

Title	First song(s)	Second song(s)	Producer(s)	Album(s)	Peak chart position(s)	Year	Ref.
"212 vs. Bust a Move"	"212" (Azealia Banks)	"Bust a Move" (Young MC)	The Outfit	More from Pitch Perfect		2012	
"All You Need Is Love / She Loves You" †	"All You Need Is Love" (The Beatles)	"She Loves You" (The Beatles)	Adam Anders, Peer Astrom	Glee Sings the Beatles		2013	
"Americano / Dance Again" †	"Americano" (Lady Gaga)	"Dance Again" (Jennifer Lopez featuring Pitbull)	Adam Anders, Peer Astrom	Glee: The Music, Season 4, Volume 1		2012	
"Anything Goes / Anything You Can Do" †	"Anything Goes" (Anything Goes)	"Anything You Can Do" (Annie Get Your Gun)	Adam Anders, Peer Astrom	Glee: The Music, The Complete Season Three		2011	
"Any Way You Want It / Lovin', Touchin', Squeezin'" †	"Any Way You Want It" (Journey)	"Lovin', Touchin', Squeezin'" (Journey)	Adam Anders, Peer Astrom	Glee: The Music, Journey to Regionals	58 (US)	2010	
"At Your Funeral for a Friend"	"At Your Funeral" (Saves the Day)	"This Years Most Open Heartbreak" (Funeral for a Friend)	The Legion of Doom	Incorporated		2007	
"Begin to Spin Me Round" †	"I Begin to Wonder" (Dannii Minogue)	"You Spin Me Round (Like a Record) (Dead or Alive)	Skele-Gamer	Non-album single		2003	
"Being Nobody" †	"Ain't Nobody" (Liberty X)	"Being Boiled" (The Human League)	Richard X	Richard X Presents His X-Factor Vol. 1 / Being Somebody	3 (UK)	2003	
"Bruised Water" †	"I Bruise Easily" (Natasha Bedingfield)	"Saltwater" (Chicane)	Chicane	The Best of Chicane: 1996–2008	42 (UK)	2008	
"Bamboleo / Hero"	"Caballo Viejo" (Gipsy Kings)	"Hero" (Enrique Iglesias)	Adam Anders, Peer Astrom	Glee: The Music, The Complete Season Three		2012	
"The Bitch Is Back / Dress You Up" †	"The Bitch Is Back" (Elton John)	"Dress You Up" (Madonna)	Adam Anders, Peer Astrom	Glee: The Music, The Complete Season Four		2013	
"Borderline / Open Your Heart" †	"Borderline" (Madonna)	"Open Your Heart" (Madonna)	Adam Anders, Peer Astrom	Glee: The Music, The Power of Madonna	78 (US)	2009	
"Boys / Boyfriend" †	"Boys" (Britney Spears featuring Pharrell Williams)	"Boyfriend" (Justin Bieber)	Adam Anders, Peer Astrom	Britney 2.0		2012	
"Bye Bye Bye / I Want It That Way" †	"Bye Bye Bye" ('N Sync)	"I Want It That Way" (Backstreet Boys)	Adam Anders, Peer Astrom	Glee: The Music, The Complete Season Four		2013	
"Bulletproof vs. Release Me"	"Bulletproof" (La Roux)	"Release Me" (Agnes Carlsson)	The Outfit	More from Pitch Perfect		2012	
"Can't Get Blue Monday Out of My Head"	"Can't Get You Out of My Head" (Kylie Minogue)	"Blue Monday" (New Order)	Kurtis Rush	B-side to "Love at First Sight" ‡		2002	
"Centerfold / Hot in Herre" †	"Centerfold" (The J. Geils Band)	"Hot in Herre" (Nelly)	Adam Anders, Peer Astrom	Glee: The Music, The Complete Season Four		2013	
"Cheeky Armada"	"I See You Baby" (Groove Armada featuring Gramma Funk)	"You Can't Hide From Yourself" (Teddy Pendergrass)	Illicit	Non-album single	72 (UK)	2000	
"Cherish / Cherish"	"Cherish" (The Association)	"Cherish" (Madonna)	Adam Anders, Peer Astrom	Glee: The Music, The Complete Season Three		2012	
"Cold Heart (Pnau remix)"	"Sacrifice" (Elton John)	"Rocket Man" (Elton John)	Nicholas Littlemore, Sam Littlemore, Peter Mayes	The Lockdown Sessions	7 (US)	2021	
"Crazy / (You Drive Me) Crazy" †	"Crazy" (Aerosmith)	"(You Drive Me) Crazy" (Britney Spears)	Adam Anders, Peer Astrom	Britney 2.0		2012	
"Crazy in Love / Hair" †	"Crazy in Love" (Beyoncé featuring Jay-Z)	"Hair" (Hair)	Adam Anders, Peer Astrom	Glee: The Music, The Complete Season One		2009	
"Destination Calabria" †	"Destination Unknown" (Alex Gaudino)	"Calabria" (Rune)	Alex Gaudino, Maurizio Nari, Ronnie Milani	My Destination	4 (UK)	2004	
"Diamonds Are a Girl's Best Friend / Material Girl" †	"Diamonds Are a Girl's Best Friend" (Marilyn Monroe)	"Material Girl" (Madonna)	Adam Anders, Peer Astrom	Glee: The Music, The Complete Season Four		2013	
"Do You Know (I Go Crazy)" †	"Do You Know" (Michelle Gayle)	"Children" (Robert Miles)	Angel City	Love Me Right	8 (UK)	2004	
"Doctor Pressure" †	"Drop the Pressure" (Mylo)	"Dr. Beat" (Miami Sound Machine)	Mylo	Destroy Rock & Roll	3 (UK)	2005	
"Don't Stand So Close to Me / Young Girl" †	"Don't Stand So Close to Me" (The Police)	"Young Girl" (Gary Puckett & The Union Gap)	Adam Anders, Peer Astrom	Glee: The Music, Volume 2	64 (US)	2009	
"Don't Wanna Lose This Groove"	"Don't Wanna Lose This Feeling" (Dannii Minogue)	"Into the Groove" (Madonna)	Neïmo	B-side to "Don't Wanna Lose This Feeling" ‡		2003	
"Dreadlock Women"	"Independent Women Part I" (Destiny's Child)	"Dreadlock Holiday" (10cc)	2manydjs	De Maxx Long Player 24: The Summer Edition		2012	
"Dub Be Good to Me" †	"Just Be Good to Me" (Beats International featuring Lindy Layton)	"The Guns of Brixton" (The Clash)	Norman Cook	Let Them Eat Bingo	1 (UK)	1990	
"Enjoy the Sheket" †	"Enjoy the Silence" (Depeche Mode)	"Sheket" (Balagan)	Bonna Music	Non-album single		2005	
""Finest Dreams"" †	"The Finest" (Kelis)	"The Things That Dreams Are Made Of" (The Human League)	Richard X	Richard X Presents His X-Factor Vol. 1	8 (UK)	2003	
"Flashing for Money" †	"Flashdance" (Deep Dish)	"Money for Nothing" (Dire Straits)	DJ Sultan	George Is On		2005	
"Fly / I Believe I Can Fly" †	"Fly" (Nicki Minaj featuring Rihanna)	"I Believe I Can Fly" (R. Kelly)	Adam Anders, Peer Astrom	Glee: The Music, The Complete Season Three		2012	
"Found/Tonight" †	"The Story of Tonight" (Hamilton)	"You Will Be Found" (Dear Evan Hansen)	Alex Lacamoire	Non-album single	48 (US)	2018	
"Freak like Me" †	"Freak like Me" (Sugababes)	"Are 'Friends' Electric?" (Gary Numan & Tubeway Army)	Girls on Top	Angels with Dirty Faces	1 (UK)	2002	
"The Girl Is Mine" †	"Girl" (Destiny's Child)	"The Boy Is Mine" (Brandy and Monica)	99 Souls	Non-album single		2015	
"Halo / Walking on Sunshine" †	"Halo" (Beyoncé)	"Walking on Sunshine" (Katrina and the Waves)	Adam Anders, Peer Astrom	Glee: The Music, The Complete Season One	40 (US)	2009	
"Happy Days Are Here Again / Get Happy" †	"Happy Days Are Here Again" (Barbra Streisand)	"Get Happy" (Judy Garland)	Adam Anders, Peer Astrom	Glee: The Music, The Complete Season Two	48 (US)	2010	
"Hand In My Pocket / I Feel the Earth Move" †	"Hand In My Pocket" (Alanis Morissette)	"I Feel the Earth Move" (Carole King)	Adam Anders, Peer Astrom	Jagged Little Tapestry		2015	
"Hit Me With Your Best Shot / One Way Or Another" †	"Hit Me with Your Best Shot" (Pat Benatar)	"One Way or Another" (Blondie)	Adam Anders, Peer Astrom	Glee: The Music, The Complete Season Three	86 (US)	2011	
"Homeward Bound / Home" †	"Homeward Bound" (Simon & Garfunkel)	"Home" (Phillip Phillips)	Adam Anders, Peer Astrom	Glee: The Music, Season 4, Volume 1		2012	
"Horny as a Dandy" †	"Horny '98" (Mousse T)	"Bohemian Like You" (The Dandy Warhols)	Loo & Placido	Non-album single	17 (UK)	2006	
"Hungry Like the Wolf / Rio" †	"Hungry Like the Wolf" (Duran Duran)	"Rio" (Duran Duran)	Adam Anders, Peer Astrom	Glee: The Music, The Complete Season Three		2012	
"I Can't Go for That (No Can Do) / You Make My Dreams" †	"I Can't Go for That (No Can Do)" (Hall & Oates)	"You Make My Dreams" (Hall & Oates)	Adam Anders, Peer Astrom	Glee: The Music, The Complete Season Three	80 (US)	2011	
"I Feel Pretty / Unpretty" †	"I Feel Pretty" (West Side Story)	"Unpretty" (TLC)	Adam Anders, Peer Astrom	Glee: The Music, Volume 6	22 (US)	2011	
"I Love New York / New York, New York" †	"I Love New York" (Madonna)	"New York, New York" (On the Town)	Adam Anders, Peer Astrom	Glee: The Music, The Complete Season Two	81 (US)	2011	
"I Still Believe / Super Bass" †	"I Still Believe" (Mariah Carey)	"Super Bass" (Nicki Minaj)	Adam Anders, Peer Astrom	Glee: The Music, The Complete Season Four		2013	
"I’m God / Demons" †	"I'm God (Clams Casino and Imogen Heap)"	"Demons" (ASAP Rocky)	Clams Casino	Non-album single		2023	
"It's My Life / Confessions Part II" †	"It's My Life" (Bon Jovi)	"Confessions Part II" (Usher)	Adam Anders, Peer Astrom	Glee: The Music, The Complete Season One	30 (US)	2009	
"The Ladyboy Is Mine" †	"Lady (Hear Me Tonight)" (Modjo)	"The Boy Is Mine" (Brandy and Monica)	Stuntmasterz	Non-album single	10 (UK)	2001	
"Let's Have a Kiki / Turkey Lurkey Time" †	"Let's Have a Kiki" (Scissor Sisters)	"Turkey Lurkey Time" (Promises, Promises)	Adam Anders, Peer Astrom	Glee: The Music, Season 4, Volume 1		2012	
"Love Don't Let Me Go (Walking Away)" †	"Love Don't Let Me Go" (David Guetta)	"Walking Away" (The Egg)	Joachim Garraud, The Egg, David Guetta	Fuck Me I'm Famous - Ibiza Mix 06	3 (UK)	2006	
"Magnificent Romeo"	"The Magnificent Seven" (The Clash)	"Romeo" (Basement Jaxx)	2manydjs	The Singles (Special Edition) / The Singles: Part II		2005	
"Money for Nothing/Beverly Hillbillies*" †	"Money for Nothing" (Dire Straits)	"The Ballad of Jed Clampett" (Paul Henning)	Rick Derringer	UHF - Original Motion Picture Soundtrack and Other Stuff		1989	
"Moves Like Jagger / Jumpin' Jack Flash" †	"Moves Like Jagger" (Maroon 5 featuring Christina Aguilera)	"Jumpin' Jack Flash" (The Rolling Stones)	Adam Anders, Peer Astrom	Glee: The Music, The Complete Season 3	62 (US)	2012	
"Mr. Roboto / Counting Stars" †	"Mr. Roboto" (Styx)	"Counting Stars" (OneRepublic)	Adam Anders, Peer Astrom	City of Angels		2014	
"Music Inferno"	"Music" – also includes a sample of "Where's the Party?" (Madonna)	"Disco Inferno" (The Trammps)	Stuart Price	The Confessions Tour		2007	
"Nasty / Rhythm Nation" †	"Nasty" (Janet Jackson)	"Rhythm Nation" (Janet Jackson)	Adam Anders, Peer Astrom	Non-album single		2013	
"Nowadays / Hot Honey Rag" †	"Nowadays" (Chicago)	"Hot Honey Rag" (Chicago)	Adam Anders, Peer Astrom	Glee: The Music, The Complete Season Two		2010	
"Offshore '97" †	"Offshore" (Chicane)	"A Little Love, A Little Life" (Power Circle)	Anthony Pappa	Non-album single	17 (UK)	1997	
"Old Time Rock and Roll / Danger Zone" †	"Old Time Rock and Roll" (Bob Seger)	"Danger Zone" (Kenny Loggins)	Adam Anders, Peer Astrom	Glee: The Music, The Complete Season Four		2013	
"One Less Bell to Answer / A House is Not a Home" †	"One Less Bell to Answer" (The 5th Dimension)	"A House Is Not a Home" (Dionne Warwick)	Adam Anders, Peer Astrom	Glee: The Music, Volume 3 Showstoppers	53 (US)	2009	
"People Hold On (Bootleg Mix)" †	"People Hold On" (Coldcut featuring Lisa Stansfield)	"Professional Widow (Armand Van Helden Remix)" (Tori Amos)	Dirty Rotten Scoundrels	Lisa Stansfield	4 (UK)	1997	
"Perfect (Exceeder)" †	"Perfect" (Princess Superstar)	"Exceeder"	Mason	Non-album single	3 (UK)	2007	
"Pompeii/Waiting All Night" (Live at The Brits 2014)	"Pompeii" (Bastille)	"Waiting All Night" (Rudimental featuring Ella Eyre)	Rudimental	Brit Awards 2016	21 (UK)	2014	
"Pool Mashup: Just the Way You Are/Just a Dream"	"Just the Way You Are" (Pitch Perfect cast)	"Just a Dream" (Pitch Perfect cast)	Jason Moore, Julia Michaels, Julianne Jordan, The Underdogs	Pitch Perfect	111 (US)	2012	
"Rapture Riders" †	"Riders on the Storm" (The Doors)	"Rapture" (Blondie)	Mark Vidler	Non-album single		2005	
"Rhythm Nation / You Gotta Be"	"Rhythm Nation" (Janet Jackson)	"You Gotta Be" (Des'ree)	Kay Cannon, Keith Harrison, Anne Preven, Matt Rad	Cinderella		2021	
"Roc Juice"	"Love Juice (Danger Remix)" (Symbol'ne)	"Roc Boys" (Jay-Z)	The MashMaticians	The MashoChist		2010	
"Seek Bromance"	"Love You Seek" (DJ Samuele Sartini)	"Bromance" (Tim Berg)	Tim Berg	Non-album single	13 (UK)	2010	
"Singin' In The Rain / Umbrella" †	"Singin' in the Rain" (Gene Kelly)	"Umbrella" (Rihanna ft. Jay Z)	Adam Anders, Peer Astrom	Glee: The Music, The Complete Season Two	18 (US)	2010	
"Sparkling Diamond" †	"Diamonds Are a Girl's Best Friend" (Marilyn Monroe)	"Material Girl" (Madonna)	Anton Monsted, Baz Luhrmann, Josh Abraham, Craig Armstrong, and Marius de Vries	Moulin Rouge! Music from Baz Luhrmann's Film		2013	
"Stars Troll" †	"Stars Align" (Kaskade)	"Troll" (Qulinez)	Kaskade	Non-album single		2012	
"Rumour Has It / Someone Like You" †	"Rumour Has It" (Adele)	"Someone Like You" (Adele)	Adam Anders, Peer Astrom	Glee: The Music, Volume 7	11 (US)	2011	
"Start Me Up / Livin' on a Prayer" †	"Start Me Up" (The Rolling Stones)	"Livin' on a Prayer" (Bon Jovi)	Adam Anders, Peer Astrom	Glee: The Music, The Complete Season Two	31 (US)	2010	
"Stop! In the Name of Love / Free Your Mind" †	"Stop! In the Name of Love" (The Supremes)	"Free Your Mind" (En Vogue)	Adam Anders, Peer Astrom	Glee: The Music, The Complete Season Two	38 (US)	2010	
"Sunny Side of the Street/Fool in the Rain"	"Sunny Side of the Street" (various artists)	"Fool in the Rain" (Led Zeppelin)	Nikki Yanofsky	Nikki		2010	
"Survivor / I Will Survive" †	"Survivor" (Destiny's Child)	"I Will Survive" (Gloria Gaynor)	Adam Anders, Peer Astrom	Glee: The Music, The Complete Season 3	51 (US)	2011	
"Sweet Dreams Are Made of Seven Nation Army"	"Seven Nation Army" (The White Stripes)	"Sweet Dreams (Are Made of This) (Eurythmics)	The Muhlenberg Dynamics	Rain Check		2016	
"Thriller / Heads Will Roll" †	"Thriller" (Michael Jackson)	"Heads Will Roll" (Yeah Yeah Yeahs)	Adam Anders, Peer Astrom	Glee: The Music, Volume 5	38 (US)	2011	
"Toca's Miracle"	"Toca Me" (Fragma)	"I Need a Miracle" (Sue Brice A.K.A. Coco Star)	DJ Vimto/Fragma	Toca	1 (UK)	2000	
"The Ultimate Juke Box Hero / I Love Rock and Roll Mashup (D33pblue Mix)"	"Jukebox Hero" (Foreigner)	"I Love Rock and Roll" (Joan Jett/Britney Spears)	D33pblue (Shane Holton)	Non-album single		2015	
"The Way You Look Tonight / You're Never Fully Dressed Without a Smile" †	"The Way You Look Tonight" (Fred Astaire)	"You're Never Fully Dressed Without a Smile" (Annie)	Adam Anders, Peer Astrom	Glee: The Music, The Complete Season Four		2012	
"Will You Love Me Tomorrow / Head Over Feet" †	"Will You Love Me Tomorrow" (Carole King)	"Head Over Feet" (Alanis Morissette)	Adam Anders, Peer Astrom	Jagged Little Tapestry		2015	
"We Are Mirage"	"Mirage" (Eric Prydz)	"We Are the People" (Empire of the Sun)	Eric Prydz	Every Day (Remixes)		2012	
"Whatta Man / Seven Nation Army"	"Whatta Man" (Salt-N-Pepa with En Vogue)	"Seven Nation Army" (The White Stripes)	Kay Cannon, Keith Harrison, Anne Preven, Matt Rad	Cinderella		2021	
"You and I / You and I" †	"You and I" (Lady Gaga)	"You and I" (Eddie Rabbitt and Crystal Gayle)	Adam Anders, Peer Astrom	Glee: The Music, The Complete Season Three	69 (US)	2011	
"You Learn / You've Got a Friend" †	"You Learn" (Alanis Morissette)	"You've Got a Friend" (Carole King)	Adam Anders, Peer Astrom	Jagged Little Tapestry		2015	
