= Jason O'Bryan =

- Origin: London, England
- Occupations: Record producer, engineer, composer
- Years active: 1990–present
- Labels: Geffen, Interscope, Wall of Sound, PWL, R&S
- Website: dubpistolsmusic.co.uk

Jason O'Bryan is an English record producer and bassist from London, England. He was a member of the Dub Pistols (1997–2010) and worked on the Grammy Award nominated soundtrack of the film Y Tu Mamá También.

== Early work ==
By the mid-1990s the London-based producer was releasing records under the 'Ceasefire' moniker on the Wall of Sound label (including Trickshot feat. Al Pacino), and recording for Belgium's techno label R&S Records with partner Meat Katie as Avenue A alongside Joey Beltram, Jaydee, C.J Bolland and Aphex Twin. Midway through the decade he joined the Dub Pistols, headed by ex-club promoter Barry Ashworth.

== Dub Pistols ==
The Dub Pistols initial Point Blank album surfed the late 1990s big beat wave with tracks such as “Cyclone”, “Westway” and “There's Gonna Be A Riot” championed by Norman Cook, Afrika Bambaata and the Chemical Brothers. The band's first singles were “There's Gonna Be a Riot” and “Best Got Better. in 1998. The album came out the same year.

The band's second album Six Million Ways To Live, signed to major US label Geffen, featured guest vocals by Terry Hall from The Specials, Planet Asia and long term Massive Attack vocalist Horace Andy, the album's success led to O'Bryan working alongside Barry Ashworth as the producer and remixer of choice for many popular artists including Moby, Limp Bizkit, Ian Brown, Bush, Korn, Natalie Imbruglia, Bono (U2), Lily Allen, Rob Zombie, Scissor Sisters, Audioweb, Arkarna, Banco de Gaia, Bow Wow Wow, The Crystal Method, Scapegoat Wax, Sly & Robbie, The Freestylers, Apollo 440, Mantronix, Hurricane No.1, Collapsed Lung and Dee Patten.

== Speakers and Tweeters ==
Singer Terry Hall again joined the group in 2007 for Speakers and Tweeters, which featured covers of "Rapture" (Blondie), "Peaches" (the Stranglers), and "Gangsters" (from Hall's old group, the Specials).

Hall is on record as saying that singing with the Dub Pistols – and realising how much love was out there for The Specials – was instrumental in their reunion. Indeed, having also played live with the Dub Pistols a few times, guitarist Lynval Golding asked the Dub Pistols to support The Specials on their first comeback tour. Lindy Layton joined the band, reprising "Dub Be Good to Me", at their support slot to The Specials at the O2 Academy, Brixton

== Rum and Coke ==
Recorded in Barbados, the band's fourth album was Rum & Coke, the album featured Lindy Layton (formerly in Norman Cook's Beats International project), DJ Justin Robertson (Lionrock/Deadstock 33s) and trombone player Ashley Slater (also in the band Freak Power with Norman Cook).

== Discography ==
=== Remixes ===
- Moby – James Bond Theme (Dub Pistols Remix) – 1997 Mute Records
- Bush – History (Dub Pistols Mix) – 1997 Interscope Records
- Korn – Good God (Dub Pistols Mix) 1997 Epic
- Natalie Imbruglia – Smoke (Dub Pistols Vocal) – 1998 – RCA
- Sly And Robbie – Fatigue Chic (Dub Pistols Remix) – 1999 – Palm Pictures
- Bow Wow Wow – Eastern Promise (Dub Pistols Vs. Bow Wow Wow Mix) – 1999 – Priority Records
- Rob Zombie – Spookshow Baby (Super Ultra-Deluxe Mix) – 1999 – Geffen Records
- Ian Brown – Dolphins Were Monkeys (Dub Pistols Mix) – 2000 – Polydor
- Limp Bizkit – My Way – (Pistols' Dancehall Dub) – 2001 Interscope
- The Crystal Method – You Know It's Hard (Dub Pistols Dub Mix) – 2001 – Outpost Recordings
- The Crystal Method – Murder (Dub Pistols Dub Mix) – 2001 – Outpost Recordings
- Scissor Sisters – Laura – (City Hi-Fi Remix) – 2003 – Polydor
- Lily Allen – The Fear (Dub Pistols Remix) – 2009 – Parlophone

=== Albums ===
- Point Blank (1998)
- Never The Less (Avenue A) (2000)
- Six Million Ways to Live (2001 & 2005)
- Speakers and Tweeters (2007)
- Rum & Coke (2009)

=== Singles ===
- Trickshot – Ceasefire (1995)
- Cyclone (1998) – UK No. 63
- Problem Is (2003) – UK No. 66 (billed as Dub Pistols featuring Terry Hall)
- Rapture (2007) – (billed as Dub Pistols featuring Terry Hall)
- Peaches (2007) – (billed as Dub Pistols featuring Terry Hall & Rodney P)
- Back To Daylight (2009)
- I'm in Love (2009)

== Film and television work ==
O'Bryan also contributed original music for the Blade 2 soundtrack co-writing with the rapper Busta Rhymes, which paired UK electronic artists with US rappers.

Six Million Ways to Live a song co-written by O'Bryan was used as the end title music in the Chris Rock and Anthony Hopkins movie Bad Company and Dub Pistols song Official Chemical was used in the Joel Schumacher movie 'Driven' featuring Sylvester Stallone. The US series Bullrun also features O'Bryan's music as the programme's theme music as well as incidental music throughout the series.

O'Bryan's music Keep Movin was used as the trailer music for the first Austin Powers film. The song was also featured in the Ben Stiller Movie Mystery Men. O'Bryan's music featured in the motion picture 'Zoolander' also co-starring Owen Wilson.

O'Bryan worked in Mexico City on a production for director Alfonso Cuaron (Gravity) and the band Molotov to create original music for Cuaron's film Y Tu Mamá También, which was nominated for a Grammy Award for Best Soundtrack Album for a Motion Picture, Television or Other Visual Media.

== Video games ==
O'Bryan's compositions have been featured in various video games:

- Gotta Learn was featured in EA Sports' FIFA 99 (1998).
- Cyclone was featured in Tony Hawk's Pro Skater 2 (2000).
- Official Chemical was featured in FreQuency (2001) and Mat Hoffman's Pro BMX 2 (2002).
- Architect was featured in Juiced (2005).
- Soldiers, featuring Planet Asia was featured in Final Fight: Streetwise (2006).
- Running From The Thoughts was used in NBA Live 08 (2007) and Tiger Woods PGA Tour 09 (2008).
- Open was used in Dance Dance Revolution X (2008).

== Live performance ==
O'Bryan (with the Dub Pistols) has performed at The Glastonbury Festival (UK), Reading Festival (UK), Solidays (Paris), V Festival, Creamfields (Argentina), Rockness (UK) and the Vans Warped Tour (USA). From the early beginnings as a sound-system project, the Dub Pistols grew into a live act.

In December 2011, the Dub Pistols were named the 'Best Live Band 2011' in DJ Magazine's annual Best of British Awards and the band celebrated whilst playing to over 100,000 people at an event broadcast live to a TV audience of over two million people. Dub Pistols were also voted 'Best UK Live Act 2013' at the Breakspoll awards.
