= Small Axe (soundtrack) =

Small Axe (Music Inspired By The Original TV Series)

Soundtrack album by various artists
- Released: 11 June 2021
- Recorded: Various times
- Genre: Reggae; pop; soul; blues
- Length: 54:16
- Label: Motown

Small Axe (Music Inspired By The Original TV Series) is the soundtrack album to the 2021 anthology series of the same name created and directed by Steve McQueen. The soundtrack was released through Motown on June 11, 2021, and featured 16 songs with artists such as Toots and the Maytals, Marvin Gaye, Tiana Major9, Rochenda Sandall, Michael Kiwanuka amongst others.

== Background ==
McQueen associated with music supervisor Ed Bailie to select contemporary American black and Jamaican artists such as Al Green, Toots and the Maytals among others, as the music became a way to make people feel vulnerable and changed how sound waves and unstructured music can sound to a being, allowing people to feel whole. His familial influence to various genres of music has been implemented, which included Jim Reeves' baritone music in the short films Mangrove and Red, White and Blue, and the calpyso, reggae and blues being another major influence in the soundtrack.

The extended soundtrack to Small Axe featured standout contributions from Michael Kiwanuka, performing a cover version of Nina Simone's "To Be Young, Gifted and Black"; McQueen who was familiar with Kiwanuka's work considered the song as his version of a music box being opened, as the original version had "a rallying call, it has a galvanising message to it that people have the capacity to do anything" and Kiwanuka's version being simplistic was considered to be a perfect fit. A cover version of Janet Kay's "Silly Games" was performed by Tiana Major9. McQueen stated that while discussing with her on the phone, Tiana told him about her West Indies background and how she wanted to approach the song as it was a huge anthem.

Mica Levi composed the original score for the series. Levi used an arrangement of wooden instruments, representing the West Indian background for Mangrove. McQueen noted that the use of guitars and steel drums were basically made from American oil barrels, which had to be organic and have a human contact.

Al Green's cover version of Bee Gees' "How Can You Mend a Broken Heart" for a moment between John Boyega's character and the father in Red, White and Blue. McQueen loved the tune as for the Bee Gees it represented the idea of union, and in the short film, the father and son are trying to mend their relationship. In Lovers Rock, an energetic song called "Kunta Kinte" by the Revolutionaries went off "like a dog whistle" when McQueen listened to it. Junior English's "After Tonight" was considered McQueen's favorite as it was "so romantic". However, McQueen felt that Lovers Rock was made for the women and it had no space for the female characters, as at the time it was more reggae versions. "Silly Games" was outlined in the script of the film, and wanted to capture the nature of party dwellers reaching for the notes of Kay's dancing filler well past the song's closing credits, was part of the dynamic setup of that sequence.

== Release ==
Small Axe (Music Inspired by the Original TV Series) was released on 11 June 2021 through Motown digitally. A vinyl edition of the album was released the following day, coinciding Record Store Day.

== Reception ==
Jack Oxford of Clash wrote "Though even more additional original material would have been welcomed due to the excellent performances of Michael Kiwanuka and Tiana Major9, as well as the spoken word poetry by Linton Kwesi Johnson, everything about ‘Small Axe (Music Inspired By The Original TV Series)’ feels natural, and the record can stand alone as a separate, thought- provoking piece of art."

== Track listing ==
No.	Title	Artist(s)	Length
1.	"Protest"	Mica Levi	2:10
2.	"Pressure Drop" (Single Version)	Toots and the Maytals	2:53
3.	"Throw Away Your Gun"	Prince Far I	4:20
4.	"New Crass Massahkah"	Linton Kwesi Johnson	6:31
5.	"Uprising"	Sheyi Cole	1:32
6.	"Got to Give It Up"	Marvin Gaye	4:04
7.	"Silly Games"	Tiana Major9	3:52
8.	"Dread Beat An' Blood"	Rochenda Sandall	1:19
9.	"Old Bailey"	Mica Levi	0:49
10.	"To Be Young, Gifted and Black"	Michael Kiwanuka	2:37
11.	"So Good, So Right"	Imagination	6:56
12.	"After Tonight"	Junior English	3:29
13.	"In God You Must Trust"	Mica Levi	2:12
14.	"Inglan Is A Bitch"	Shaun Parkes	1:39
15.	"Silly Games" (Lovers Rock Edit)	Janet Kay	6:42
16.	"More Warning"	King Tubby; Augustus Pablo; the Aggrovators	3:11
Total length:			54:16

== Chart performance ==
Chart (2021)	Peak position
UK Compilation Albums (OCC)	74
US Top Soundtracks (Billboard)	23

== Accolades ==
Award	Category	Nominee(s)	Result	Ref.
Los Angeles Film Critics Association Awards	Best Music	Mica Levi (for "Lovers Rock")	Runner-up	
