= Right About Now (song) =

2004 single by Mousse T.

Single by Mousse T. featuring Emma Lanford

from the album All Nite Madness
- Released: 6 December 2004
- Length: 3:16
- Label: Peppermint Jam; free2air
- Songwriters: Oliver Dommaschk; Stavros Ioannou; Mousse T.; Errol Rennalls
- Producer: Mousse T.

Mousse T. singles chronology
| "Pop Muzak" (2004) | "Right About Now" (2004) | "Horny as a Dandy" (2006) |

Emma Lanford singles chronology
| "Is It 'Cos I'm Cool?" (2004) | "Right About Now" (2004) | "Horny as a Dandy" (2006) |

"Right About Now" is a single by German disc jockey Mousse T. It was released as the final single released from his second studio album, All Nite Madness (2004), on 6 December 2004. The song peaked at number 28 on the UK Singles Chart, number 19 in Italy, and number six in Finland. In 2005, the song represented Lower Saxony in the Bundesvision Song Contest 2005, placing fourth with 85 points.

== Charts ==
=== Weekly charts ===
| Chart (2004–2006) | Peak position |
|---|---|
| Australia (ARIA) | 51 |
| Australian Club Chart (ARIA) | 1 |
| Australian Dance (ARIA) | 11 |
| Austria (Ö3 Austria Top 40) | 49 |
| Finland (Suomen virallinen lista) | 6 |
| Germany (GfK) | 47 |
| Hungary (Dance Top 40) | 16 |
| Ireland Dance (IRMA) | 10 |
| Italy (FIMI) | 19 |
| Scottish Singles Sales (Official Charts) | 23 |
| Switzerland (Schweizer Hitparade) | 94 |
| UK Singles (Official Charts) | 28 |
| UK Dance (Official Charts) | 5 |
| UK Indie (Official Charts) | 3 |

=== Year-end charts ===
| Chart (2005) | Position |
|---|---|
| Australian Club Chart (ARIA) | 15 |

== Release history ==
| Region | Date | Format(s) | Label(s) | Ref. |
|---|---|---|---|---|
| United Kingdom | 6 December 2004 | 12-inch vinyl; CD | free2air | |
| Germany | 28 January 2005 | CD | Peppermint Jam | |
