= Blade II (soundtrack) =

Blade II: The Soundtrack

Soundtrack album by Various artists
- Released: March 19, 2002
- Genres: Electronic music; hip hop; techno
- Length: 58:42
- Label: Immortal Records
- Producers: Happy Walters & Jeff FarleyGuillermo del Toro (exec.); Peter Frankfurt (exec.); Wesley Snipes (exec.); Danny Saber; Roni Size; BT; Dan the Automator; DJ Muggs; Dub Pistols; Fatboy Slim; Gorillaz; Groove Armada; Marco Beltrami; Moby; Neil Davidge; Paul Oakenfold; Robert Del Naja; Steve Osborne; The Crystal Method; Tom Morello; Volume 10

Professional ratings
Review scores
Source	Rating
AllMusic	3/5 stars
Robert Christgau	(1-star Honorable Mention)

Blade II: The Soundtrack is the soundtrack to Guillermo del Toro's 2002 film Blade II. It was released on March 19, 2002 via Immortal Records, serving as a follow-up to Blade: Music from and Inspired by the Motion Picture.

It features contributions by hip hop artists, such as Bubba Sparxxx, Busta Rhymes, Cypress Hill, Eve, Fabolous, Ice Cube, Jadakiss, Mos Def, Mystikal, Rah Digga, Redman, Silkk the Shocker, The Roots, Trina and Volume 10, while production was handled mainly by electronic musicians, including BT, Danny Saber, Dub Pistols, Gorillaz, Groove Armada, Fatboy Slim, Moby, Paul Oakenfold, Roni Size and The Crystal Method among others.

The soundtrack is the third in a trilogy of genre-blending soundtracks produced by Happy Walters and released by Immortal Records. It was preceded by the soundtracks for Judgment Night (1993) and Spawn (1997).

== Track listing ==
No.	Title	Writer(s)	Producer(s)	Length
1.	"Blade (Theme from Blade)" (Danny Saber & Marco Beltrami)	Danny Saber; Marco Beltrami	Danny Saber; Marco Beltrami	3:01
2.	"Cowboy" (Eve & Fatboy Slim)	Eve Jeffers; Kasseem Dean; Jay Jackson; Mashonda Tifrere; Norman Cook	Norman Cook	5:31
3.	"I Against I" (Mos Def & Massive Attack)	Mos Def; Robert Del Naja; Grant Marshall; Neil Davidge	Robert Del Naja; Neil Davidge	5:40
4.	"Right Here, Right Now" (Ice Cube & Paul Oakenfold)	O'Shea Jackson; Paul Oakenfold; Andy Gray; Steve Osborne	Paul Oakenfold; Steve Osborne	4:10
5.	"Tao of the Machine" (The Roots & BT)	Tariq Trotter; Brian Transeau	BT	3:17
6.	"Child of the Wild West" (Cypress Hill & Roni Size)	Louis Freese; Larry Muggerud; Ryan Williams	Roni Size; DJ Muggs	4:14
7.	"The One" (Dub Pistols, Busta Rhymes & Silkk the Shocker)	Trevor Smith; Vyshon Miller; Barry Ashworth; Jason O'Bryan	Dub Pistols	3:44
8.	"We Be Like This" (Danny Saber, Fabolous & Jadakiss)	John Jackson; Jason T. Phillips; Danny Saber	Danny Saber	5:45
9.	"Gorillaz on My Mind" (Gorillaz & Redman)	Redman; 2D; Murdoc; Russel; Noodle	Dan the Automator; Gorillaz	4:30
10.	"Gangsta Queens" (Groove Armada, Trina & Rah Digga)	Katrina Taylor; Rashia Fisher; Andy Cato; Tom Findlay	Groove Armada	3:54
11.	"PHDream" (The Crystal Method & Bubba Sparxxx)	Warren Mathis; Ken Jordan; Scott Kirkland	The Crystal Method; Tom Morello	3:52
12.	"Raised in the Hood" (Roni Size & Volume 10)	Dino D. Hawkins; Ryan Williams	Roni Size; Volume 10	3:26
13.	"Gettin' Aggressive (Mowo! “Mix”)" (Moby & Mystikal)	Michael Tyler; Moby	Moby; Mocean Worker (add.)	3:39
14.	"Mind What You Say" (bonus track) (Buppy)	Lennox Brown		3:58
Total length:				58:47

== Charts ==
=== Weekly charts ===
Chart (2002)	Peak position
Austrian Albums (Ö3 Austria)	19
Canadian Albums (Billboard)	28
French Albums (SNEP)	106
German Albums (Offizielle Top 100)	19
Hungarian Albums (MAHASZ)	36
New Zealand Albums (RMNZ)	39
Swiss Albums (Schweizer Hitparade)	48
US Billboard 200	26
US Top Dance Albums (Billboard)	1

=== Year-end charts ===
Chart (2002)	Position
Canadian R&B Albums (Nielsen SoundScan)	42
US Top Dance/Electronic Albums (Billboard)	4
