= Rum and Coke (disambiguation) =

Rum and Coke is a cocktail consisting of cola, rum, and traditionally lime juice.

Rum and Coke may also refer to:

- Rum & Coke (album), a 2009 album by Dub Pistols
- "Rum and Coca-Cola", a 1943 song by Lord Invader, also recorded by the Andrews Sisters
