= All Nite Madness =

2004 studio album by Mousse T.

Studio album by Mousse T.
- Released: 5 April 2004
- Label: Peppermint Jam
- Producer: Mousse T.

Mousse T. chronology
Gourmet de Funk (2002)	All Nite Madness (2004)	Re-orchestrated (2007)

Singles from All Nite Madness
- 1. "Is It 'Cos I'm Cool?" Released: 16 February 2004; 2. "Pop Muzak" Released: 15 August 2004; 3. "Right About Now" Released: 6 December 2004; 4. "Wow" Released: 2005

All Nite Madness is the second album by German-Turkish DJ Mousse T. It was released in 2004 and peaked at number 69 on the German Albums Chart, as well as number 49 on the Swiss Albums Chart. Four singles were released from the album: "Is It 'Cos I'm Cool?", "Pop Muzak", "Right About Now", and "Wow". On some versions of the album, "Horny as a Dandy", produced by Loo & Placido and which was later released as a single in 2006, appears as track 7. "Is It 'Cos I'm Cool" gave Mousse T. his third top-10 hit in the United Kingdom, peaking at number nine on the UK Singles Chart, while "Pop Muzak" was the album's highest-charting single in Germany, reaching number 19 on the German Singles Chart.

== Track listing ==
1. "Underground" (with Hugh Cornwell) - 3:59
2. "Is It 'Cos I'm Cool?" (with Emma Lanford) - 4:03
3. "Sex Has Gone" (with Andrew Roachford) - 4:20
4. "By Myself" (with Inaya Day) - 3:56
5. "Music Makes Me Fly" (with Amiel) - 4:57
6. "Wow" (with Emma Lanford) - 4:16
7. "Turn Me On" (with Kathleen Chaplin) - 4:06
8. "Right About Now" (with Emma Lanford) - 3:52
9. "Monotony" (with Calvin Lynch) - 5:05
10. "All Nite Madness" (with Hanifah Walidah) - 4:33
11. "Pop Muzak" (with Andrew Roachford) - 3:54
12. "Bounce" (with Dacia Bridges) - 4:11
13. "Theme of Cool" - 5:57
14. "Just Look at Us Now" (with James Kakande) - 5:26
15. "Is It 'Cos I'm Cool?" (Torso Club mix) (bonus track)
16. "Pop Muzak" (Ian Pooley remix) (bonus track)
- Note: On some versions of the album, "Horny as a Dandy" produced by Loo & Placido appears as track 7.

== Charts ==
Weekly chart performance for All Nite Madness
Chart (2004)	Peak position
German Albums (Offizielle Top 100)	69
Swiss Albums (Schweizer Hitparade)	48
