= Percussion Explosion! =

Percussion Explosion

Studio album by Herman Kelly & Life
- Released: 1978
- Studio: Miami Sound Studio, R.C.A. Studios
- Genre: Soul; Funk
- Length: 32:11
- Label: Alston Records
- Producer: Herman Kelly

Percussion Explosion is the only studio album by short lived and revolutionary Miami, Florida group Herman Kelly & Life.

== Track listing ==
- All songs written by Herman Kelly, except where noted.
1. Dance To The Drummer's Beat 5:09
2. Time After Time 4:38
3. A Refreshing Love 6:40
4. Who's The Funky D.J. ? 8:34 (Thomas Fundora, Kelly)
5. Share Your Love 3:30
6. Do The Handbone 3:40

== Charts ==
=== Singles ===
| Year | Single | Chart positions |
| Year | Single | US R&B |
|---|---|---|
| 1978 | "Dance To The Drummer's Beat" | 92 |
