= Chocolate Salty Balls =

1998 song from South Park

"Chocolate Salty Balls (P.S. I Love You)"

Single by Chef (Isaac Hayes)

from the album Chef Aid: The South Park Album
- B-side: "O Holy Night" (snippet); "Come Sail Away"
- Released: December 14, 1998
- Genre: Comedy; funk; novelty
- Length: 3:55
- Label: Columbia; American
- Songwriter: Trey Parker
- Producer: Rick Rubin

Isaac Hayes singles chronology
| "Ike's Rap" (1986) | "Chocolate Salty Balls (P.S. I Love You)" (1998) | "Simultaneous" (1999) |

"Chocolate Salty Balls (P.S. I Love You)" is a song from the American animated sitcom South Park, performed by the character Chef and featured on the soundtrack album Chef Aid: The South Park Album. The song's vocals are performed by Isaac Hayes, the voice actor for Chef. The song as it originally appeared was in the 1998 episode "Chef's Chocolate Salty Balls", in which Chef creates a confectionery treat, the eponymous Chocolate Salty Balls. He then begins to sing the lyrics that became the basis for the single.

The song was released as a single on December 14, 1998, and reached No. 1 on both the UK and Irish singles charts. It also charted in mainland Europe and Australia, becoming a top-five hit in Denmark, the Netherlands, and Norway while peaking at No. 14 in Australia. The song was written by South Park co-creator Trey Parker and produced by Rick Rubin.

== Song information ==
The song's first and second verses feature Chef listing the ingredients for his "Chocolate Salty Balls", an innuendo meaning testicles (even though the lyrics throughout refer to the confectionery treat). However, there is no mention of salt in the recipe. He also urges people to "suck on [them]" during the chorus. After listing the ingredients, he sings the lines, "Say, everybody, have you seen my balls / they're big and salty and brown / if you ever need a quick pick-me-up / just stick my balls in your mouth", starting the chorus.

During the song's final verse, Chef becomes concerned that his Chocolate Salty Balls have become burned, and urges his lover to blow on them. In particular the lyrics he sings at that point are: "Hey ... wait a minute ... What's that smell? It smells like something's burnin'. Well, that don't confront me none, as long as I get my rent paid on Friday. Baby, you better get back in the kitchen ... 'cause I've got a sneakin' suspicion. Oh, man baby ... Baby! You just burned my balls!" The verse features a line from the song "One Bourbon, One Scotch, One Beer".

An alternate radio version of the song removes the "I'm Chef" intro, the musical outro and subsequent audience cheer found in the Chef Aid: The South Park Album version making it sound more like a traditional studio recording. Most noticeably, it contains an alternate final verse where Chef is serenading the listener while his chocolate salty balls are baking in the oven, replacing the entire comedic "You just burned my balls!" verse/skit found in the original album version. A saxophone solo and a slightly altered ending chorus (before the song fades to end) were also added. This version can be found on the UK compilation album New Hits 99.

The song was included on the fourth episode of series two of Cold Feet. Hayes also performed the song live at the 2002 Glastonbury Festival.

== Chart performance ==
"Chocolate Salty Balls (P.S. I Love You)" reached No. 1 on the UK Singles Chart. The song was a contender for the Christmas No. 1 single in the UK but debuted at No. 2, behind the Spice Girls' "Goodbye", missing out on the top spot by 8,000 copies and garnering the most weekly sales for a song at No. 2 since Wham!'s "Last Christmas" in 1984. The following week, the track dethroned "Goodbye", giving Isaac Hayes his first and only number-one hit in the UK. The song became the seventh-best-selling single of 1998 in the UK. "Chocolate Salty Balls" was also a top-20 hit in Australia, peaking at No. 14 in February 1999.

== Music video ==
The song's music video features various clips from season one and season two of South Park. It can be found on the South Park DVD South Park: The Chef Experience.

== Track listings ==
European CD single

1. "Chocolate Salty Balls (P.S. I Love You)" – 4:01
2. "O Holy Night (Snippet)" (Eric Cartman feat. Kyle Broflovski and Mr. Garrison) – 2:00

European cassette single

1. "Chocolate Salty Balls (P.S. I Love You)" – 3:55
2. "Come Sail Away" (Eric Cartman) – 5:12

European and Australian CD maxi single

1. "Chocolate Salty Balls (P.S. I Love You)" – 3:55
2. "O Holy Night (Snippet)" (Eric Cartman feat. Kyle Broflovski and Mr. Garrison) – 2:21
3. "Oh Little Town of Bethlehem" (Ned Gerblansky feat. Uncle Jimbo) – 0:58

UK maxi-CD single

1. "Chocolate Salty Balls (P.S. I Love You)" – 3:55
2. "Come Sail Away" (Eric Cartman) – 5:12
3. "Mentally Dull (Think Thank Remix)" (Vitro) – 3:45

== Personnel ==
- Bass – Eric Presley
- Drums – Matt Stone
- Engineer – David Schiffman
- Guitar – Bruce Howell
- Keyboards – Trey Parker
- Mixing – D. Sardy, Rick Rubin
- Percussion – Chris Trujillo
- Producer – Rick Rubin
- Vocals – Isaac Hayes
- Writing – Trey Parker

== Charts ==
=== Weekly charts ===
| Chart (1998–1999) | Peak position |
|---|---|
| Australia (ARIA) | 14 |
| Belgium (Ultratop 50 Flanders) | 15 |
| Denmark (IFPI) | 4 |
| Europe (Eurochart Hot 100) | 7 |
| France (SNEP) | 82 |
| Ireland (IRMA) | 1 |
| Netherlands (Dutch Top 40) | 6 |
| Netherlands (Single Top 100) | 8 |
| Norway (VG-lista) | 5 |
| Scotland Singles (OCC) | 1 |
| Sweden (Sverigetopplistan) | 17 |
| UK Singles (OCC) | 1 |

=== Year-end charts ===
| Chart (1998) | Position |
|---|---|
| UK Singles (OCC) | 7 |

| Chart (1999) | Position |
|---|---|
| Belgium (Ultratop 50 Flanders) | 80 |
| Europe (Eurochart Hot 100) | 76 |
| Netherlands (Dutch Top 40) | 59 |
| Netherlands (Single Top 100) | 84 |
| UK Singles (OCC) | 108 |
