= Mousse T. =

German-Turkish musician

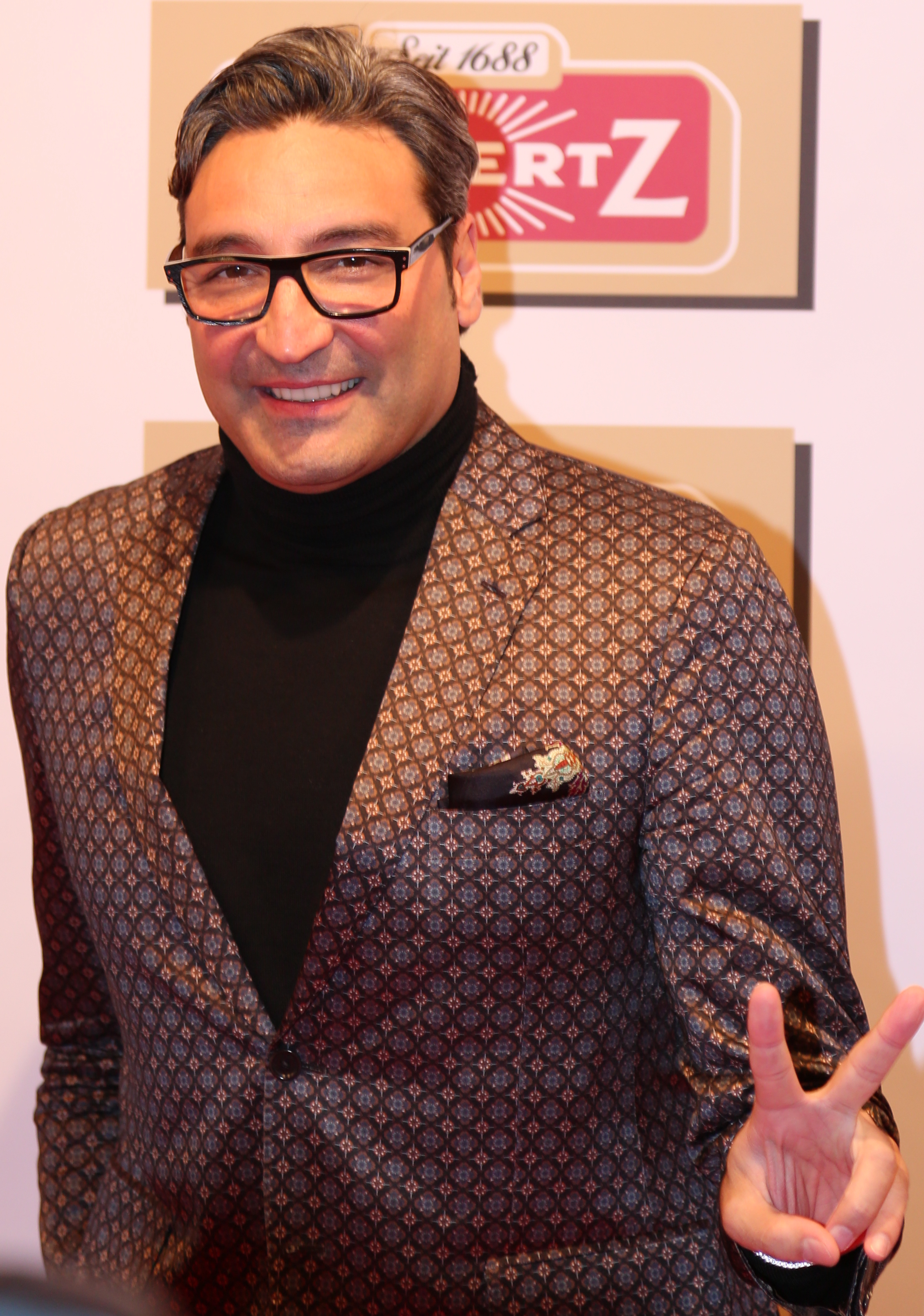
- Mousse T. at the Lambertz Monday Night 2017

Background information
- Also known as: Mousse T., Afropeans, Mind Flavour, Raw Instinct
- Born: Mustafa Gündoğdu; 2 October 1966 (age 59); Hagen, North Rhine-Westphalia, West Germany
- Origin: Turkish
- Genres: House; funk; pop
- Occupations: DJ; producer
- Years active: 1989–present
- Label: Peppermint Jam
- Website: Official website

Mustafa Gündoğdu ([mustaˈfa ɟynˈdoːdu]; born 2 October 1966), best known under his stage name Mousse T., is a German-Turkish DJ, record producer, film music composer and judge on season 15 of Deutschland sucht den Superstar, the German version of Pop Idol.

He is best known for the 1998 house hit "Horny '98" (featuring "Hot 'n' Juicy" and famous for the hook "I'm horny") and for his collaboration with Tom Jones on the 2000 pop hit "Sex Bomb", from Jones' 1999 album Reload.

Mousse T. is one of the first producers of house music in his country, alongside contemporaries Boris Dlugosch, DJ Tonka and Ian Pooley.

== Biography ==
Mustafa Gündoğdu was born in 1966 in Hagen, then in West Germany, to Turkish parents. He started learning music aged 13. He began his career in 1990 as keyboardist for a small band known as "Fun Key B". He began to use the moniker Mousse T. in 1994 and at the same time he set up his own recording studio and began DJing in the city of Hannover. Besides working on his own productions, usually with partner Errol Rennalls, he also wrote and produced tracks for other artists. In 1993, Mousse T. founded, along with Rennalls, Peppermint Jam Records, a record label specializing in uplifting house and melodic Acid jazz music.

His 1998 song "Horny '98" featuring Hot 'n' Juicy (and with a chorus sung by Inaya Day on vocals) reached the top of the Billboard dance charts in the late 1990s and Top 20 in the UK and Australia. The track was also featured on Chef Aid: The South Park Album. Mousse T.'s first album, Gourmet de Funk, was released in 2002. In 2004, he once again entered the Single Charts with his song "Is It 'Cos I'm Cool?" (featuring Emma Lanford, a former Hot 'n' Juicy member), which was featured on his second album, All Nite Madness, also released in 2004. In the same year Mousse T. produced the summer hit "Il Grande Baboomba", of the Italian singer Zucchero Fornaciari, from the latter's album Zu & Co., and he took part in the concert at the Royal Albert Hall, held in London in May 2004, with the other guests of the Italian bluesman.

In 2005, Mousse T. performed with Emma Lanford and represented Lower Saxony in the Bundesvision Song Contest 2005 with the song "Right About Now", placing 4th with 85 points. In 2006, "Loo & Placido" released a mash-up called "Horny as a Dandy". The song fused the vocals of "Horny '98" and the music of "Bohemian Like You" by The Dandy Warhols.

Also in 2006, he collaborated with another German-born Turkish artist, singer Tarkan, and composed three different remixes for the track Start the Fire, from Tarkan's album Come Closer, released on April 7, in that year. In 2007, Mousse T. wrote and produced the music for Marc Rothemund's film: Pornorama. His music has been featured in several films and TV series in both the U.S. and internationally.

In 2018, he joined the jury of Deutschland sucht den Superstar, the German equivalent to Pop Idol. In 2020, Mousse T. was ranked number one at the Top House Artists of 2020 by Traxsource. In 2022, he produced Gianni Morandi's song Apri tutte le porte, written by Jovanotti and presented at the Sanremo Music Festival in the same year.

== Discography ==
=== Albums ===
List of albums, with selected chart positions
Title	Year	Peak chart positions		
Title	Year	GER	AUT	SWI
Gourmet de Funk	2002	22	44	46
All Nite Madness	2004	69	—	49
Right About Now (re-release of All Nite Madness in the UK and Australia)	2004	—	—	—
Re-orchestrated (iTunes only; live album with the Deutsches Filmorchester Babelsberg and conductor Scott Lawton)	2007	—	—	—
Where Is the Love	2018	69	—	—

=== Singles ===
Mousse T.

Most tracks co-written by Errol Rennalls

List of singles, with selected chart positions
Title	Year	Peak chart positions						Certifications
Title	Year	GER	AUS	AUT	NLD	SWI	UK	Certifications
"Mine" (as Davey Dee & Mousse T.)	1994	—	—	—	—	—	—	
"EP" (as Davey Dee & Mousse T.)	1995	—	—	—	—	—	—	
"Come and Get It"	1996	—	—	—	—	—	—	
"Everybody"	1996	—	—	—	—	—	—	
"Bad Boy" / "Horny"	1997	—	—	—	—	—	—	
"Horny '98" (vs. Hot 'n' Juicy)	1998	28	13	17	31	11	2	ARIA: Platinum; BPI: Platinum
"Ooh Song" / "More I Get"	1999	—	—	—	—	—	—	
"Sex Bomb" (with Tom Jones)	2000	3	35	3	11	1	3	BVMI: Gold; BPI: Silver; IFPI AUT: Gold; IFPI SWI: Gold
"Fire" (with Emma Lanford)	2002	73	—	—	—	36	58	
"Brother on the Run"	2003	—	—	—	—	—	—	
"Is It 'Cos I'm Cool?" (with Emma Lanford)	2004	33	44	12	47	27	9	
"Pop Muzak" (with Andrew Roachford)	2004	19	—	14	—	73	—	
"Right About Now" (with Emma Lanford)	2004	47	51	49	—	94	28	
"Wow" (with Emma Lanford)	2005	—	—	—	—	—	—	
"Horny as a Dandy" (vs. The Dandy Warhols)	2006	40	30	13	38	30	17	
"All Nite Long (D.I.S.C.O.)" (with Suzie)	2009	71	—	—	—	—	—	
"Boyfriend"	2018	—	—	—	—	—	—	
"Melodie"	2018	—	—	—	—	—	—	

Afropeans

- "Pianolick" (2000)
- "No. 1" (2001)
- "Everybody/Fallin'" (2003)
- "Afropeans EP" (2004)
- "Better Things" with Inaya Day (2004)

Other aliases

- "Don't Stop", as Fresh & Fly with Hans Hahn (1989)
- "African Rhythm", as Fresh & Fly with Ralf Droesemeyer and Jörg Rump (1991)
- "Family of Music", as F.O.M. with Ralf Droesemeyer (1991)
- "C'mon Get Up", as F.O.M. with Ralf Droesemeyer (1991)
- "Mind Flavor EP", as Mind Flavour (1995)
- "Odyssey One", as Federation X with Grant Nelson (1996)
- "Keep Pushin'", as Booom! with Boris Dlugosch and Inaya Day (1996)
- "Hold Your Head Up High", as Booom! with Boris Dlugosch and Inaya Day (1997)
- "Miami Special", as Peppermint Jam Allstars with Boris Dlugosch and Michi Lange (2001)

(Co-)Production for other artists

- Psyche – "Angel Lies Sleeping" (1991)
- Marc Davis – "Moviestar" (1992)
- Ve Ve – "We've Got Love" (1995)
- Raw Instinct – "De La Bass" (1996)
- Ferry Ultra feat. Roy Ayers – "Dangerous Vibes" (1997)
- Bootsy Collins feat. MC Lyte – "I'm Leavin U (Gotta Go, Gotta Go)" (1997)
- Byron Stingily – "Sing a Song" (1997)
- Randy Crawford – "Wishing on a Star" (1997)
- Cunnie Williams – "Saturday" (1999)
- Tom Jones – "Sex Bomb" (1999)
- Monie Love – "Slice of da Pie" (2000)
- Ann Nesby – "Love Is What We Need" (2001)
- No Angels – "Let's Go to Bed" (2002)
- Inaya Day – "Nasty Girl" (2004)
- Se:Sa feat. Sharon Phillips – "Like This Like That" (2007)

=== Remixes ===
- 1995 Fun Factory – "Celebration" (Mousse T's Back To The Old School)
- 1996 Mr. President – "Coco Jamboo" (Club Mix Radio, Extended, and Dangerous Dub)
- 1997 Michael Jackson – "Ghosts"
- 1997 Nuyorican Soul – "Runaway" (Jazz Funk Experience, and Soul Dub)
- 2001 Shakedown – "At Night"
- 2006 Boney M. – "Sunny" (Radio, Extended, and Sexy Disco Club Mix)
- 2006 Tarkan – "Start the Fire" (Radio Mix)
- 2006 Tarkan – "Start The Fire" (Radio Instrumental Mix)
- 2006 Tarkan – "Start The Fire" (Abi Club Mix)
- 2017 CamelPhat ft. Elderbrook – "Cola" (Mousse T.'s Glitterbox Mix)
- 2018 Purple Disco Machine ft. Baxter – "Encore"
- 2018 Selace – "So Hooked On Your Lovin"
- 2019 Kylie Minogue – "Step Back in Time"
- 2019 The Vision featuring Andreya Triana – Heaven (Mousse T.'s Disco Shizzle Remix)
- 2020 DAVIE – Testify (Mousse T.'s Funky Shizzle Remix)
- 2020 Mike Dunn – If I Can’t Get Down (Mousse T.'s Funky Shizzle Mix)
- 2020 Wankelmut ft. Anna Leyne – Free At Last (Mousse T. Remix)
- 2025 Jules Liesl – "Cherry" (Mousse T. Remix, Mousse T. Slow Jam Remix)

== See also ==
- Marianne Rosenberg
