= Hardknox =

English electronic music duo

Hardknox is an English electronic music duo consisting of producer and instrumentalist Steve Proctor and vocalist Lindy Layton. They have released two singles and a self-titled album. Their musical style features heavy beats with vocal samples and unusual loops and sound effects. Their single "Come in Hard (Don't Like Rock 'n Roll)" reached #92 on the UK Singles Chart in 2000.

The band's track "Fire Like This" is featured in the film Me, Myself and Irene and a TV advertisement for the Fiat Grande Punto in the UK. "Come In Hard (Don't Like Rock N' Roll)" is also featured in Microsoft rally game Rallisport Challenge, and the film 3000 Miles To Graceland. "Body Go" is featured in the film Rollerball. "Attitude" is featured in an episode of the TV programme La Femme Nikita and in the third episode of Misfits, and in the film My First Mister.

== Samples on "Fire Like This" ==
This song features part of Big Walter Horton's harmonica solo, played originally on "Walking by Myself" by Jimmy Rogers.

== Hardknox album ==
Hardknox

Studio album by Hardknox
- Released: 27 September 1999
- Genre: Big beat, electronic rock
- Label: Jive Records

The band's self-titled debut album was released on 27 September 1999 on Jive Records. Rapper Schoolly D provides guest vocals on the album. "Fire Like This" was earlier released as 12" single by Skint Records in 1997.

=== Track listing ===
1. "Coz I Can"
2. "Fire Like This"
3. "Come in Hard (Don't Like Rock N' Roll)"
4. "Coming Back with a Sword"
5. "Just Me 'N' You"
6. "Attitude"
7. "Who's Money"
8. "Resistance Is Futile"
9. "Psychopath"
10. "Ain't Going Down"
11. "Attitude (The Strongroom Mix)"
