= Dub Pistols =

English electronic music band

- Origin: London, England
- Genres: Big beat; electronic; alternative hip-hop; dub; reggea; ska; drum and bass
- Years active: 1996–present
- Label: Sunday Best
- Members: Barry Ashworth; Seanie Tee; Dom Bowman; Pete York; Bill Borez; Justin Mitchell; John King
- Past members: Jason O'Bryan; Andreas S Jensen; Dave Budgen; Tim Hutton; Jack Cowens; DJ Stix; T.K. Lawrence; Joshua Thomas
- Website: dubpistolsmusic.co.uk

Dub Pistols are an English electronic music band founded in 1996 by Barry Ashworth and Jason O'Bryan.

== Career ==
The band's first singles were "There's Gonna Be a Riot" and "Best Got Better" in 1998. Their first album, Point Blank, came out the same year. Their albums Six Million Ways to Live and Y4K: Next Level Breaks were released in 2001.

To date, they have released seven studio albums as well as contributing to numerous film soundtracks, including Blade II, Bad Company, Piranha 3D and Mystery Men. They have also released a significant number of remixed tracks from other artists. The most notable of these include a remix of Ian Brown's "Dolphins Were Monkeys", Limp Bizkit's "My Way", the Crystal Method's "Do It", and Moby's "James Bond Theme".

Their third album, Speakers and Tweeters was released in 2007 through Sunday Best and features T. K. Lawrence, JMS, Blade, Rodney P and Terry Hall. Their fourth album Rum'n'Coke was released in May 2009. Their fifth album, Return of the Pistoleros was released in 2015 on Rob Da Bank's label Sunday Best Recordings. Their sixth album Crazy Diamonds was released in 2017 followed by their seventh album Addict, released in October 2020. Their latest studio album Frontline was released in March 2023.

== Video game soundtracks ==
Various Dub Pistols songs have been featured in video games. The song "Official Chemical", featuring vocals by JMS, Baqi Abdush-Shaheed and T. K. Lawrence was featured in the PlayStation 2 game FreQuency. The same song was also featured in the multi-platform game Mat Hoffman's Pro BMX 2. Their song "Cyclone", featuring T. K. Lawrence was featured in the multi-platform game Tony Hawk's Pro Skater 2. The song "Soldiers", featuring Planet Asia was featured in Final Fight: Streetwise. "Running From The Thoughts", featuring T. K. Lawrence and Terry Hall was used in NBA Live 08 and Tiger Woods PGA Tour 09. The song "Gotta Learn" was featured in EA Sports' FIFA 99. And finally, the song "Open" was used in Dance Dance Revolution X for the PlayStation 2. The song "Architect" was featured on the multi-platform game Juiced.

== Discography ==
=== Albums ===
- Point Blank (1998)
- Six Million Ways to Live (2001/2005)
- Speakers and Tweeters (2007)
- Rum & Coke (2009)
- Re-Hash (2011)
- Worshipping the Dollar (2012)
- Return of the Pistoleros (2015)
- Crazy Diamonds (2017)
- Addict (2020) - UK #70
- Frontline (2023)

=== Singles ===
- "Cyclone" (1998) - UK #63
- "Problem Is" (2003) (billed as Dub Pistols featuring Terry Hall) - UK #66
- "Back to Daylight" (2009)
- "I'm in Love" (2009)

== See also ==
- List of dub artists
