= Chef Aid: The South Park Album =

1998 soundtrack album by various artists

- The album's cover shows Stan, Kenny, Cartman and Kyle, while Chef is performing on stage

Soundtrack album by Issac Hayes and various artists
- Released: November 24, 1998
- Genres: Comedy; soul; hip-hop; alternative rock
- Length: 76:42
- Labels: Columbia; American
- Producer: Rick Rubin

South Park album chronology
Chef Aid: The South Park Album (1998)	Bigger, Longer & Uncut (1999)

Singles from Chef Aid: The South Park Album
- 1. "Chocolate Salty Balls" Released: December 1, 1998

Professional ratings
Review scores
Source	Rating
AllMusic	2.5/5 stars
The Austin Chronicle	3/5 stars
Entertainment Weekly	B
USA Today	2.5/4 stars

Chef Aid: The South Park Album is a soundtrack album based on the American animated television series South Park. It was released on November 24, 1998, by Columbia Records and American Recordings. Several well-known artists perform on the record, which was mainly produced by Rick Rubin. Chef Aid contains a number of songs from and inspired by the show, while other songs are largely independent from South Park. The album was released during the show's second season, shortly after the broadcast of the episode called "Chef Aid", which features many of the stars and songs that appear on the recording. Soul singer Isaac Hayes appears in character as Chef throughout the album, which mimics a live concert.

Chef Aid: The South Park Album was made available in three different versions: "Clean", "Explicit", and "Extreme". The Explicit version contains profanities (including "fuck") and carries at Parental Advisory sticker; however, it is still censored, even for lesser profanities, such as "goose shit". The Extreme version is completely uncensored.

== Songs and concept ==
There are several kinds of songs that appear on Chef Aid: The South Park Album. These include songs featured in the series, and sung by South Park characters or various artists. Other songs have been inspired by the series, with some written by the song's performer artist. The remainder of the songs are largely unrelated to South Park, although some of them have appeared on the corresponding "Chef Aid" episode.

Many of the South Park-related tracks on the album were written by show co-creator Trey Parker, and are extended versions of original songs from the series. A large portion of these, such as "Chocolate Salty Balls", are sung by soul singer Isaac Hayes, in character as Chef, the school cafeteria worker who often breaks into soul songs on the show. Other characters that appear on the record include the main boys—Stan, Kyle, Cartman and Kenny—as well as Ned Gerblansky. As on the show, the characters are voiced by the two creators; Stan, Cartman and Ned are voiced by Trey Parker, whereas Kyle and Kenny are voiced by Matt Stone.

A dramatization performed during the song "Horny" indicates that the song was included under protest.

The album is presented as a live concert. Chef performs most of the show's original songs, and also sings some lines on most of the other tracks, as well as acting as announcer between songs.

== Track listing ==
No.	Title	Writer(s)	Performed by	Length
1.	"South Park Theme"	Primus	Primus	0:40
2.	"Nowhere to Run (Vapor Trail)"	The Crystal Method, Jack Blades, DMX, Ol' Dirty Bastard, Ozzy Osbourne, Rick Rubin & John Eaton	Ozzy Osbourne, DMX & Ol' Dirty Bastard; music by The Crystal Method with Fuzzbubble	4:40
3.	"Chocolate Salty Balls (P.S. I Love You)"	Trey Parker	Isaac Hayes as "Chef"	3:55
4.	"Brad Logan"	Tim Armstrong	Rancid	2:16
5.	"Come Sail Away" (by Styx)	Dennis DeYoung	"Eric Cartman"	5:12
6.	"Kenny's Dead"	Master P & C. Mayfield ("Freddie's Dead")	Master P	3:24
7.	"Simultaneous"	Trey Parker	Isaac Hayes as "Chef"	3:17
8.	"Will They Die 4 You"	M. Betha, R. Lawrence, S. Combs, K. Jones & S. Taylor; music written by System of a Down	Mase, Puffy, Lil' Kim & System of a Down	3:52
9.	"Hot Lava"	Trey Parker	Perry Farrell & DVDA; featuring DJ Nu-Mark	3:50
10.	"Bubblegoose"	Wyclef Jean & Salaam Remi	Wyclef Jean featuring "Stan", "Kyle", "Cartman" & "Kenny"	2:52
11.	"No Substitute"	Trey Parker & Bruce Howell	Isaac Hayes as "Chef"	4:47
12.	"Wake Up Wendy"	Elton John, Bernie Taupin	Elton John	5:58
13.	"Horny"	Mousse T. & Errol Rennalls	Mousse T. vs. Hot 'n' Juicy	3:31
14.	"Huboon Stomp"	Robert Casale & Gerald V. Casale	Devo	3:21
15.	"Love Gravy"	Trey Parker	Rick James & Ike Turner	4:01
16.	"Feel Like Makin' Love" (by Bad Company)	Paul Rodgers & Mick Ralphs	"Ned Gerblansky"	3:26
17.	"The Rainbow"	Ween	Ween	2:45
18.	"Tonight Is Right for Love (With Meredith Baxter-Birney)"	Trey Parker	Isaac Hayes as "Chef" & Meat Loaf	3:03
19.	"It's a Rockin' World"	Joe Strummer	Joe Strummer; featuring Flea, Tom Morello, D. J. Bonebrake, Benmont Tench & Nick Hexum	2:31
20.	"Mephisto and Kevin"	Primus & Trey Parker	Primus	5:18
21.	"Mentally Dull" (Think Tank Remix)	Wayne Simms & David Googe	Vitro; featuring the cast of South Park	3:45
22.	"Kyle's Mom Is a Big Fat Bitch" (hidden track)	Trey Parker	"Eric Cartman"	0:48

=== Episode reference ===
Song	Episode
3. "Chocolate Salty Balls"	Season 2, Episode 9, "Chef's Chocolate Salty Balls"
5. "Come Sail Away"	Season 2, Episode 2, "Cartman's Mom Is Still a Dirty Slut"
7. "Simultaneous"	Season 2, Episode 8, "Summer Sucks"
9. "Hot Lava"	Season 1, Episode 3, "Volcano"
11. "No Substitute"	Season 1, Episode 2, "Weight Gain 4000"; Season 1, Episode 11, "Tom's Rhinoplasty"
12. "Wake Up Wendy"	Season 2, Episode 14, "Chef Aid"
15. "Love Gravy"	Season 1, Episode 1, "Cartman Gets an Anal Probe"
18. "Tonight Is Right for Love"	Season 1, Episode 5, "An Elephant Makes Love to a Pig"
22. "Kyle's Mom Is a Big Fat Bitch"	Season 1, Episode 9, "Mr. Hankey, the Christmas Poo"

== Singles ==
- "Chocolate Salty Balls (P.S. I Love You)"

CD1

1. "Chocolate Salty Balls (P.S. I Love You)" – Performed by Chef
2. "Oh Holy Night" (Snippet) – Performed by Eric Cartman
3. "Oh Little Town of Bethlehem" (Snippet) – Performed by Ned Gerblanksy

CD2

1. "Chocolate Salty Balls (P.S. I Love You)" – Performed by Chef
2. "Come Sail Away" – Performed by Eric Cartman
3. "Mentally Dull" (Think Tank Remix) – Performed by Vitro
- "Kenny's Dead"
1. "Kenny's Dead" – Performed by Master P
2. "Come Sail Away" – Performed by Eric Cartman
3. "Tonight Is Right for Love" – Performed by Chef and Meat Loaf
- "Simultaneous"

CD1

1. "Simultaneous" – Performed by Chef
2. "Kyle's Mom Is a Big Fat Bitch" (In D Minor) – Performed by Eric Cartman

CD2

1. "Simultaneous" – Performed by Chef
2. "Cheesy Poofs" (Theme) – Performed by Eric Cartman
3. "Come Sail Away" – Performed by Eric Cartman
4. "My Best Friends" (Snippet) – Performed by Eric Cartman
5. "Stinky Britches" (Snippet) – Performed by Chef
- "Bubblegoose"
1. "Bubblegoose" (Remix) – Performed by Wyclef Jean, Cartman, Kenny, Stan & Kyle
2. "Come Sail Away" – Performed by Eric Cartman
3. "No Substitute" – Performed by Chef
- "Nowhere to Run"
1. "Nowhere to Run" (Vapour Trail) – Performed by Ozzy Osbourne & DMX
2. "Will They Die 4 You?" – Performed by P Diddy, Lil' Kim & System Of A Down

== Personnel ==
- Tim Armstrong – producer (4)
- Dave Bianco – mixing (12)
- Robert Casale – engineer (14)
- Sean "Puffy" Combs – producer and vocals (8)
- The Crystal Method – original production (2)
- Mark Dearnley – engineer (9)
- Devo – producer (14)
- Nels Dielman – drums (5, 11, 18)
- Richard Dodd – mixing (9)
- John Dolmayan – drums (8)
- John Eaton – additional production (2), engineer (2)
- Perry Farrell – vocals (9)
- Richard Fortes – additional guitars and programming (2)
- Lars Frederiksen – producer (4)
- Josh Freese – drums (9)
- Geza X – mix engineer (20)
- Carl Glanville – engineer (2)
- Greg Gordon – mix engineer (17)
- Eric Greedy – mix engineer (20)
- Jean-Marie Horvat – mix engineer (6, 15), remix engineer (10)
- Bruce Howell – guitar (3, 5, 7, 9, 11, 16, 18), additional production (1)
- Wyclef Jean – co-producer (10)
- Thomas "TJ" Johnson – engineer (19)
- KLC – producer (6)
- Ron "Amen-Ra" Lawrence – producer (8)
- Lil' Kim – vocals (8)
- Daron Malakian – guitars (8)
- Mase – vocals (8)
- Master P – producer (6)
- Meat Loaf – vocals (18)
- Stephen Marcussen – album mastering
- Vlado Meller – mastering (2)
- John "JM" Meredith – engineer (2)
- Mousse T. – producer (13)
- Brendan O'Brien – additional guitars (19)
- O'Dell – producer (6)
- Shavo Odadjian – bass guitar (8)
- Trey Parker – keyboards (3, 5, 7, 9, 11, 16, 18)
- Herb Powers – mastering (6)
- Eric Presley – bass guitar (3, 5, 7, 16)
- Cok Price – additional guitars and programming (2)
- Primus – producer and mixing (1)
- Rocky Reid – additional guitars and programming (2)
- Salaam Remi – producer (10)
- Rick Rubin – producer (3–5, 7, 9, 11, 12, 14–16, 18–21), additional production (2, 8), mixing (2–7, 9, 11, 12, 14–21), remixing (8, 10), mix engineer (17)
- Dave Sardy – mixing (2–5, 7, 11, 14, 16, 18, 21), engineer (2), remixing (8)
- David Schiffman – engineer (2, 3, 5, 7, 11, 15, 16, 18, 20), additional engineering (8)
- Chris Shaw – engineer (17)
- Ed Stasium – mixing and additional guitars (19)
- Eric Stefani – clavinet (4)
- Matt Stone – drums (3, 7, 11, 16), bass guitar (5, 9, 18)
- Serj Tankian – vocals (8)
- Think Tank – remixing (21)
- Chris Trujillo – percussion (3, 5, 7, 9, 11, 15, 18, 19)
- Vitro – producer (21)
- Ween – producer (17)
- Tony Woodroffe – engineer (2)

== Chart performance ==
The album spent two weeks at number 2 on the UK Compilation Chart, held off by Now 41. It peaked at number 16 on the US Billboard 200.

== Charts ==
=== Weekly charts ===
Chart (1998–1999)	Peak position
Australian Albums (ARIA)	1
Dutch Albums (Album Top 100)	45
New Zealand Albums (RMNZ)	10
UK Compilation Albums (Official Charts)	2
US Billboard 200	16

=== Year-end charts ===
Chart (1998)	Position
Australian Albums (ARIA)	13

Chart (1999)	Position
Australian Albums (ARIA)	30
New Zealand Albums (RMNZ)	49
US Billboard 200	75

== Certifications and sales ==
Region	Certification	Certified units/sales
Australia (ARIA)	3× Platinum	210,000^{^}
Canada (Music Canada)	Platinum	100,000^{^}
New Zealand (RMNZ)	Platinum	15,000^{^}
United Kingdom (BPI)	Platinum	300,000^{^}
United States (RIAA)	Platinum	1,300,000
^{^} Shipments figures based on certification alone.
