= Excursion on the Version =

Studio album by Beats International
- Released: 1991
- Studio: Esselle
- Genre: Dance; dub
- Length: 49:13
- Label: Go! Beat
- Producer: Norman Cook

Beats International chronology
Let Them Eat Bingo (1990)	Excursion on the Version (1991)

Singles from Excursion on the Version
- 1. "Echo Chamber" Released: 1991; 2. "The Sun Doesn't Shine" Released: 1991; 3. "In the Ghetto" Released: 1991; 4. "Change Your Mind" Released: 1992

Excursion on the Version is the second and final album by the English band Beats International, released in 1991. The title refers to the reggae terminology for borrowing sounds and rhythms from existing songs to create new versions; Norman Cook adopted the phrase to describe his production methods.

"In the Ghetto" peaked at No. 44 on the UK Singles Chart, the highest position of the album's three charting singles. The band supported the album by embarking on a tour of Africa, after which they broke up. The album was not initially released in South Africa, due to the country's human rights abuses.

== Production ==
The album was produced by Norman Cook. It was recorded in Brighton, England, at Esselle, Dyke Road. The production of Excursion was influenced by ska, reggae, and dub.

== Critical reception ==
Professional ratings
Review scores
Source	Rating
AllMusic	2.5/5 stars
Calgary Herald	C−
Chicago Tribune	2.5/4 stars
Robert Christgau	(choice cut)
The Encyclopedia of Popular Music	3/5 stars
MusicHound Rock: The Essential Album Guide	2.5/5 stars
The Rolling Stone Album Guide	3.5/5 stars

The Calgary Herald determined that "this is music for mall rats, for the beat(en) generation of feel-gooders who want reggae with none of the dirt of Trenchtown in its grooves, who want lines lifted from the Clash or MC5 with none of their nasty anger, who want a tribute tune to Al Green with none of that intrusive soul stuff." Robert Christgau praised "Brand New Beat".

The Times thought that "Cook indulges his latest passion for the dropped first and third beat... The experience is pleasant enough, but his songs lack clout and the lyrics are too literal."

AllMusic wrote that "the music on this album isn't as explicitly derivative as that on the group's debut, Let Them Eat Bingo, but it's all generally derivative, especially of all-purpose ska and reggae grooves." The Rolling Stone Album Guide called the album "ephemeral but fun," and concluded that Excursion on the Version's "most affecting selection is a fairly straightforward reading of 'In the Ghetto'."

== Track listing ==
No.	Title	Writer(s)	Length
1.	"Brand New Beat"	Cook; Edwards; Ray	4:00
2.	"Change Your Mind"	Cook	3:37
3.	"Love Is Green"	Cook; Noel	4:32
4.	"Echo Chamber"	Cook; Nelson	5:47
5.	"The Sun Doesn't Shine"	Cook	3:53
6.	"Herman"	Cook; Clark; Weekes	4:12
7.	"Three Foot Skank"	Cook; Wildski; Nelson	3:59
8.	"No More Mr Nice Guy"	Cook; Noel; Harris; Lewis	3:30
9.	"Eyes on the Prize"	Cook; Noel	4:16
10.	"Ten Long Years"	Cook	4:33
11.	"In the Ghetto"	Davis	4:00
12.	"Come Home"	Cook; Withers	3:27
Total length:			49:13

== Personnel ==
Credits adapted from liner notes.

- Norman Cook – production
- Simon Thornton – engineering
- Wayne Tracey – sleeve
- Blackie – sleeve
- Glen Luchford – photography
