= Let Them Eat Bingo =

Studio album by Beats International
- Released: 2 April 1990
- Studio: Esselle Studios
- Genre: Dance; dance-pop; worldbeat; neo soul
- Length: 54:29
- Label: Go! Beat (UK); Elektra (US)
- Producer: Norman Cook

Beats International chronology
Let Them Eat Bingo (1990)	Excursion on the Version (1991)

Singles from Let Them Eat Bingo
- 1. "For Spacious Lies" Released: 1989; 2. "Dub Be Good to Me" Released: 29 January 1990; 3. "Won't Talk About It" Released: May 1990; 4. "Burundi Blues" Released: September 1990

Let Them Eat Bingo is the debut album by British electronic project Beats International, released in April 1990 on Go! Beat in the United Kingdom and Elektra in the United States. The project was founded and led by disc jockey and former Housemartins bassist Norman Cook, who produced the album alone and intended Beats International to be a collective of permanent and temporary members including singers and other performers. Cook is joined on the album by a host of contributors, including Lindy Layton, Billy Bragg, Double Trouble, and Captain Sensible.

The album is largely built around samples of other records. Although a dance record, Let Them Eat Bingo explores and fuses a vast array of styles, including hip hop, house, blues, reggae, punk rock, gospel, Latin music and African music, leading to an overall worldbeat style. Containing the UK number one single "Dub Be Good to Me" and the Top 10 hit "Won't Talk About It", the album was a success, reaching number 17 on the UK Albums Chart and receiving positive reviews from music critics who commented upon the inventive mixture of musical styles.

== Background and production ==
After the dissolution of pop band the Housemartins in 1988, their bassist Norman Cook reverted to his original career as a disc jockey and soon became one of the most successful remixers in England, a feat which inspired Cook to form Beats International. The project was not intended to be a band but rather, according to Cook, a "collective" of singers, musicians, rappers, dancers and a graffiti artist. As a studio team, the core of Beats International included Cook on bass and other instruments, vocalists Lester Noel and Lindy Layton, keyboardist Andy Boucher and rappers MC Wildski and DJ Baptiste (The Crazy MC), although the group extended to other occasional members including Billy Bragg, Captain Sensible and the Definition of Sound. The group's touring personnel included 22 members, including a 14-piece band. Cook met Lester Noel when the latter's indie band North of Cornwallis supported the Housemartins live, although Noel's interest in black music, a taste he shared with Cook, only emerged after both bands split up.

The first single from the album "For Spacious Lies" was credited to just Norman Cook and was more pop-styled than the project's subsequent singles. It included the vocals of Noel, and was followed by the production of Let Them Eat Bingo, on which it appears. Let Them Eat Bingo was produced by Cook at Esselle Studios and engineered by Simon Thornton. Cook used a sampler and turntable in the production. In addition to the Beats International core line-up, other members who appear include Bragg, Sensible, DJ Streets Ahead, Luke Cresswell, Oisin Little, Robin Watt, Sam Illunga, Jo Jo Kavund, Gilbert Sangana, John Bourne and Double Trouble, the latter of whom had appeared in the film Wild Style. The Goodyers provided a painting for the album's liner notes. In an interview prior to the release of Let Them Eat Bingo, Cook described the album as "a little bit of everything which has inspired me over the last 10 years or so."

== Composition ==
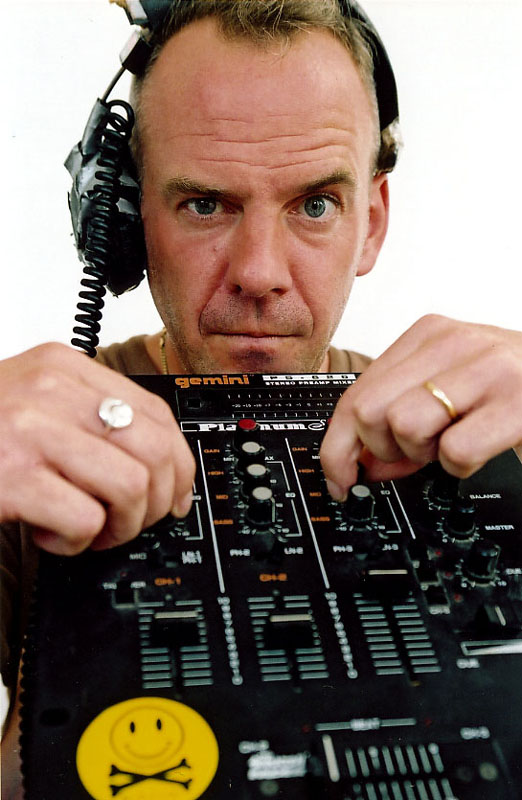
Norman Cook (pictured 2004) incorporated a wealth of samples on Let Them Eat Bingo.

Let Them Eat Bingo is a dance album that explores a variety of different musical styles from across the globe, including hip hop and rap, reggae, house, funk, big band, blues, gospel, African music, Latin music, punk rock, and rock and roll, while being rooted in British rock music. Writer Greg Sandow felt the album was too eclectic to be limited under one genre, describing it as "a producer's album, full of rabbits pulled out of unexpected musical hats." The music is largely constructed out of samples of other songs and recordings. Rick Anderson of AllMusic described the album as sampling "as blatantly as possible from as many different sources as possible" and turning the samples into funky, hook-laden dance-pop songs. He highlights the inclusion of "cribbed snippets of Delta blues, what sound very much like samples of Fela Ransome-Kuti, all kinds of interesting and obscure stuff." Critic Nathaniel Wice described Let Them Eat Bingo as a worldbeat album with familiar samples which take unexpected directions and "reggae and Latin rhythms abound". In The Village Voice, critic Robert Christgau emphasised the album's genre combinations:

Norman Cook has gone too far—the samples in his kitchen sink are just too blatant, too eclectic. Which is to say that this is the mixing record Coldcut only talk to interviewers about. Whether he's constructing a new rock and roll subgenre from blues, Burundi, and some kind of jump band or embellishing Herman Kelly's "Dance to the Drummer's Beat" with who knows what horns and African huzzahs or revivifying pleasant little tunes you can't quite place and are sort of surprised to hear again, Cook's music is perfect for people who like more stuff than they have time to listen to.

"Burundi Beats" is a fusion between worldbeat, jazz and soul music, and incorporates African drums and Billie Holiday-style vocals. "Dub Be Good to Me" was built from an instrumental Cook B-side entitled "Invasion of the State Agents", which sampled the Clash's "The Guns of Brixton" and an Ennio Morricone snippet and incorporated record scratching and a kazoo-style sound. The instrumental, considered to be an example of proto-big beat, is mashed on "Dub Be Good to Me" with Lindy Layton's new vocals, covering the S.O.S. Band song "Just Be Good to Me", and a radio DJ sample. The resulting song is considered reggae and trip hop in style, and was described by Tom Ewing of Freaky Trigger as "the Wild Bunch/Massive Attack dub-dance Bristol sound, commercialised before it had even come close to breaking through." Music & Media described it as a fusion of house and reggae with blues harmonica.

"Before I Grow Too Old" incorporates the New Orleans-style song by Fats Domino of the same name and adds extra groove. It opens with a wonky synth line which is then contrasted with post-punk riffs and electronic sounds resembling a rubber duck, exemplifying the album's humour. "The Ragged Trousered Perussionists" is a house record that makes use of Latin flutes, while "For Spacious Lies" juxtaposes serious lyrics about grievance and the international black market, with a lighthearted vibe. "Blame It on the Bassline" is a new jack swing track which samples "Blame It on the Boogie" by the Jacksons, while "Won't Talk About It" contains Billy Bragg's R&B-style falsetto vocals and atonal guitar riff and explores styles of disco, rap music, synth-pop and rock guitar. "Dance to the Drummer's Beat" contains an Afro-Cuban funk style. The album closes with the final crash from the Beatles' "A Day in the Life" (1967).

== Cover art ==
The front cover shows a digitised version of various nations flags surrounded by wreaths somewhat reminiscent of the United_Nations emblem. The inner sleeve has a hand drawn picture of a number of real and fictional characters in a nightclub seen from the point of view of the a DJ at the decks. From left to right they are: Ken Livingstone, Elvis Costello, Mick Jones, Joe Strummer, Martin Luther King Jr, The Monocled Mutineer, ALF, George Best, Scooby Doo, John Peel, Mohammed Ali, Frank Sidebottom, Stevie Wonder, Tony Benn, Fidel Castro, Billy Bragg, Detective Michael "Mick' Belker from the TV series Hill Street Blues, and Mahatma Gandhi. Many of these personalities are noted in Helen Mead's NME review of the LP [32]

== Release and promotion ==
"To have a number one you have to sell to grannies and ten-year-olds, I didn't think grannies would get into a record like that. It took six hours to make. I'm still shocked. It appealed to me, but I didn't think it would appeal to Simon Bates. It's got scratching noises on it and a bassline that doesn't follow the rest of the song. I suppose anything can happen now."

— Norman Cook on the success of "Dub Be Good to Me"

In the United Kingdom, Let Them Eat Bingo was released in March 1990 by Go! Beat. Released on CD, cassette and vinyl formats, the CD edition included a bonus twelve-inch version of "For Spacious Lies". In the United States, it was released on 20 April 1990 by Elektra Records and promoted as "an inventive mix of unshakeable pop melodies, world music references, choice sampling and club floor rhythms." The album was successful worldwide, and spent 15 weeks on the UK Albums Chart, peaking at number 17. It went on to receive gold certification. The album peaked at number 63 in Australia on the ARIA chart, and spent 10 weeks in the top 100.

Ahead of the album's release, "Dub Be Good to Me" was issued as a single. In February 1990, the song reached number one on the UK Singles Chart, and it ultimately became the year's seventh biggest seller, helping to secure the album's success. It also reached number 3 on the Eurochart Hot 100, and had made the Top 3 in the Netherlands, Greece, and Austria. The single was controversial in that the sampled bassline from "The Guns of Brixton" was uncleared, leading to legal action. Writer Colin Larkin nonetheless notes: "This 'creative theft' may have diminished royalty cheques, but the interpretation of various styles and even passages of music proved a deliberate strategy in Beats International's armoury." "Won't Talk About It", which had previously been released as a Norman Cook solo single in 1989, was re-released as a single from Let Them Eat Bingo, reaching number 9 in May 1990. The final charting single, "Burundi Beats", failed to repeat the success of the previous singles, peaking at number 51 in September 1990.

== Critical reception ==
Professional ratings
Review scores
Source	Rating
AllMusic	4/5 stars
Chicago Tribune	3/4 stars
Entertainment Weekly	A
Los Angeles Times	3/5 stars
NME	6/10
The Philadelphia Inquirer	3/4 stars
Q	4/5 stars
The Rolling Stone Album Guide	3.5/5 stars
Smash Hits	9/10
The Village Voice	A−

In a review for the Chicago Tribune, Robert Tanzilo hailed Let Them Eat Bingo as "one of the more refreshing dance records of late" and "a wonderful mess" with fully successful genre fusions. Greg Sandow, reviewing for Entertainment Weekly, wrote: "There's nothing wrong with pure pleasure in music, and this album provides it." He wrote that the "music just soars" and praised its blending of musical styles and "effortless melody," concluding that "Let Them Eat Bingo is good enough exactly as it is." Nathaniel Wice of Spin magazine wrote that the album's "oh-so-clever dance music is rich and varied enough to yield many listens, even straight through on auto-reverse or play," but felt that purist fans of the incorporated genres could find the album "too snide or facile to tolerate" due to its lack of overall style. Melinda Rickelman, writing for The Crisis, viewed the mixture of styles more positively, praising the album's unpredictability and "fine young beats" and recommending the record to Deee-Lite fans.

In New York magazine, Elizabeth Wurtzel wrote that "Let Them Eat Bingo combines hip-hop, reggae, rap, punk, and even rebel-yelling to a dance-happy effect." Mademoiselle reviewer Christian Logan Wright hailed the album as "a journey through hip-hop, the '70s, many voices (high male, low female), distant cultures and [Cook's] record collection." Writing for Playboy, Robert Christgau called the album "the mixing record music lovers dream about—with bits of Afropop and Delta blues and disco and folk-strum and every kind of pop-funk hybrid segued together into a universal dance music that earns its billing, nothing is forbidden and everything fits." He later named it the year's 9th best album in his Pazz & Jop Dean's List ballot. Soul singer Etta James praised the album in a column on neo soul records in Spin. She lauded the "stupid" style of "Burundi Blues" and felt the rest of the album contained experiments with "beats and stuff, and that's cool too."

Q magazine listed Let Them Eat Bingo among the 50 best albums of 1990. In a retrospective review for AllMusic, Rick Anderson named the record an "Album Pick" and described it as Cook "just showing how much fun you can have with a sampler and flawless taste in beats". For Trouser Press, Glenn Kenny wrote: "At its best, this is clever stuff that, beyond being enjoyable strictly on its own, provocatively recontextualizes its sources and creates an endlessly fascinating cross-cultural weave." He did nonetheless feel that the album's worst moments were "just boring and silly." In the 2004 Rolling Stone Album Guide, Douglas Wolk called Let Them Eat Bingo "the grandfather of mash-up/bootleg culture". In 2014, Derek Staples of Spectrum Culture felt the album had been unfairly obscured and commented that "Beats International created a cacophony of sound that resisted the impulse of dulling the individual elements. Like the rumblings of most any downtown center, this chaos turns to beauty with the support of the right conductor." He felt the album was a precedent for Sbtrkt's Wonder Where We Land (2014) in that both records had "the courage to explore across the spheres of indie-pop, club music, and hip hop".

== Track listing ==
No.	Title	Writer(s)	Length
1.	"Burundi Blues"	Norman Cook	5:07
2.	"Dub Be Good to Me"	Cook; James Harris III; Terry Lewis	3:37
3.	"Before I Grow Too Old"	Dave Bartholomew; Fats Domino; Robert Charles Guidry	4:05
4.	"The Ragged Trousered Percussionists"	Cook; Gabi Mutumbo	4:05
5.	"For Spacious Lies"	Cook; Steve Kidby	4:08
6.	"Blame It on the Bassline"	Cook; Dave Jackson; Elmar Krohn; Michael Jackson	4:52
7.	"Won't Talk About It"	Cook; Billy Bragg	4:36
8.	"Dance to the Drummer's Beat"	Herman Kelly	5:33
9.	"Babies Makin' Babies (Stoop Rap)"	Cook; Kevin Smith; Rodney Stone	4:00
10.	"The Whole World's Down on Me"	B.B. Seaton; Ken Boothe; Lloyd Charmers	3:40
11.	"Tribute to King Tubby"	Cook	5:03
12.	"For Spacious Lies (12" Version)" (available on CD only)	Cook	5:38

== Personnel ==
=== Major contributors ===
- Norman Cook – producer
- Simon Thornton – engineer
- Andrew Boucher – keyboards
- Lindy Layton – vocals
- Billy Bragg – vocals
- Captain Sensible – vocals
- Double Trouble – vocals
- MC Wildski – vocals

=== Other contributors ===
- John Bourne
- Luke Cresswell
- Sam Illunga
- Charles Kilenga
- Jo Jo Kavund
- Jeff Kumwarma
- Oisin Little
- Gabi Mutumbo
- Lester Noel
- Gilbert Sangana
- DJ Streets Ahead
- Robin Watt

== Charts and certifications ==
=== Weekly charts ===
Chart (1990)	Peak position
Australian Albums (ARIA)	63
Austrian Albums (Ö3 Austria)	23
German Albums (Offizielle Top 100)	41
Dutch Albums (Album Top 100)	54
New Zealand Albums (RMNZ)	20
Swiss Albums (Schweizer Hitparade)	30
UK Albums (OCC)	17
US Billboard 200	162

=== Certifications ===
Region	Certification	Certified units/sales
United Kingdom (BPI)	Gold	100,000^{^}
^{^} Shipments figures based on certification alone.
