= Six Million Ways to Live =

Studio album by Dub Pistols
- Released: 2001; February 11, 2005
- Label: Distinct'ive Records, INgrooves
- Producer: Dub Pistols

Dub Pistols chronology
Point Blank (1998)	Six Million Ways to Live (2001)	Speakers and Tweeters (2007)

Six Million Ways to Live is an album by Dub Pistols, released in 2005. It was originally released in 2001 as a promotional CD with a different track list. Its single, "Problem Is" featuring Terry Hall, charted at No. 66 on the UK Singles Chart in 2003.

== Track listing ==
1. "Sound Clash" - 1:14
2. "World Gone Crazy" (featuring Horace Andy) - 04:42
3. "Problem Is" (featuring Terry Hall) - 3:47
4. "Six Million Ways to Live" - 5:05
5. "Riptides" - 4:41
6. "Soul Shaking" - 4:16
7. "Soldiers" (featuring Planet Asia) - 6:06
8. "Still Breathing" - 3:31
9. "Architect" - 3:31
10. "Official Chemical" - 3:17
11. "6AM" - 3:55

== 2001 promo track listing ==
1. "Soldiers" (featuring Planet Asia) - 6:01
2. "Big World" - 5:04
3. "Problem Is" (featuring Terry Hall) - 3:43
4. "Official Chemical" - 3:31
5. "3am" - 3:40
6. "Six Million Ways to Live" - 5:04
7. "Revolution" - 5:03
8. "Crazy" (a.k.a. "World Gone Crazy") (featuring Horace Andy) - 4:39
9. "Riptides" - 4:37
10. "Soul Shaking (Conduct Disorderly)" - 4:23
11. "Architect" - 3:37
12. "Together as One" - 5:38
