= Rum & Coke (album) =

Studio album by Dub Pistols
- Released: May 29, 2009
- Studio: Satellite Studios
- Genre: Electronica
- Label: Sunday Best
- Producers: Barry Ashworth, Jason O'Bryan

Dub Pistols chronology
Speakers and Tweeters (2007)	Rum & Coke (2009)

Rum & Coke is a 2009 album by British electronica band Dub Pistols. It features guest appearances from Rodney P, Ashley Slater (Freak Power), Lindy Layton (Beats International) and DJ Justin Robertson.

== Composition ==
Rum & Coke incorporates many genres, including reggae, rap, ska, dub and urban music.

== Reception ==
Lou Thomas of BBC Music wrote that the Dub Pistols "kept the quality control high" on Rum & Coke, calling it "a likeable combination of genres that mesh so well." The Independent's Andy Gill rated the album three stars out of five, describing it as "a collection of summary, mostly laid-back grooves designed to keep spirits cool at carnival time." Rory Taylor from Contact Music rated Rum & Coke eight out of ten, writing, "I don't think there's need for any further evidence. the Dub Pistols are smokin'."

== Track listing ==
1. "Back to Daylight" – 4:21
2. "I'm in Love" – 4:05
3. "Everyday Stranger" – 5:01
4. "Revitalise" – 5:20
5. "Ganja" – 3:55
6. "She Moves" – 3:16
7. "Peace of Mind" – 5:00
8. "Keep the Fire Burning" – 3:52
9. "Six Months" – 4:09
10. "Song for Summer" – 6:58

== Personnel ==
Personnel for Rum & Coke adapted from Allmusic

- Barry Ashworth – writing
- William Borez – writing, keyboards, programming
- Cody Burridge – photography
- Matt Edwards – management
- Tim Hutton – guitar, horn
- Jason O'Bryan – writing
- Rodney Panton – writing
- Justin Robertson – writing
- Ashley Slater – writing
- Matthew Thomas – writing
- Oliver J. Woods – assistant
