= Dub Be Good to Me =

1990 single by Beats International

Single by Beats International

from the album Let Them Eat Bingo
- Released: 24 January 1990
- Genre: Dub; reggae; house
- Length: 3:59
- Label: Go! Beat
- Songwriters: Norman Cook; James Harris III; Terry Lewis
- Producer: Norman Cook

Beats International singles chronology
"Dub Be Good to Me" (1990)	"Won't Talk About It" (1990)

Music video
- "Dub Be Good to Me" on YouTube

"Dub Be Good to Me" is a song by British dub group Beats International with singer Lindy Layton on vocals, released on 24 January 1990 by Go! Beat Records as the first single from their debut album, Let Them Eat Bingo (1990). Although writing credits are attributed to frontman Norman Cook it is almost an exact replica of the SOS Band's 1983 hit "Just Be Good to Me", which it is named after. It also samples the songs "The Guns of Brixton" by the Clash, "Man with a Harmonica" from the Once Upon a Time in the West soundtrack by Ennio Morricone, and "Jam Hot" by Johnny Dynell.

"Dub Be Good to Me" was a number-one hit in the United Kingdom and also reached number one on the US Billboard Dance Club Play chart. MTV Dance ranked the song at number 59 on their list of "The 100 Biggest 90's Dance Anthems of All Time" in 2011.

== Production ==
Written by Norman Cook (aka Fatboy Slim), "Dub Be Good to Me" was the sole number one single for Cook's outfit Beats International.

The track started out as an instrumental with the title "The Invasion of the Estate Agents". While also included as the B-side to this single, it originally appeared as the B-side to Cook's 1989 single "For Spacious Lies". This instrumental track is heavily based on the bassline from the Clash's "Guns of Brixton", with a sample of the distinctive "harmonica" theme from the epic western film Once Upon a Time in the West, written by Ennio Morricone. This instrumental, in slightly remixed form, had vocals added from the SOS Band's "Just Be Good to Me" (as re-recorded by Lindy Layton) to form "Dub Be Good to Me". Cook told in an interview:

It was Lindy's idea to do a cover of the S.O.S. Band's 1983 hit 'Just Be Good To Me'. I knew it would go well with other beats because I'd tried it as a DJ. I used the bassline from The Clash song 'Guns Of Brixton', which was me tipping my hat to The Clash as I was such a big fan. I also wanted to do something slower than the current house music, yet something funky you could get into.

The song features the distinctive vocals of David John-Baptiste, more commonly known as DJ Deejay or just DJ. The opening and closing line "tank fly boss walk jam nitty gritty you're listening to the boy from the big bad city, this is jam hot, this is jam hot" was from Johnny Dynell's 1983 single "Jam Hot", and the drum track is a loop of the oft-sampled break from "God Make Me Funky" by the Headhunters.

== Critical reception ==
Bill Coleman from Billboard magazine described "Dub Be Good to Me" as a "reggae-fied, Soul II Soul-tinged reworking", adding that "big on import, stateside release sports the new remixes. Only misgiving is absence of fab original." Ernest Heardy from Cash Box wrote that this brainchild of Norman Cook "revamps" "Just Be Good to Me" "into a shoulderswaying, hip-swinging groove that never lets up." Dave Sholin from the Gavin Report noted that Cook from the Housemartins takes this 1983 track by the SOS Band, "beats and mixes well, and what emerges is a fresh delicacy for now tastes." He concluded, "Charts #1 in England and there's no reason to doubt it'll have a real good run in the States, too." Simon Reynolds from Melody Maker remarked that "the heartquake synths of the original [are] replaced by sonar bleeps, ocean bed alarums, lugubrious horns and a lonesome, Midnight Cowboy harmonica. Just fine."

Upon the album release, another editor, Andrew Smith, wrote, "Out of this was fashioned a languid, smirking, gem of a tune, which we're probably all sick of by now. It nevertheless constitutes one of the finest shagging records ever made, proving once again that Norman Cook is a clever chap who knows a good bassline and how to filch it." Pan-European magazine Music & Media described it as an "appealing mixture of house and reggae", complimenting "good vocals by Lindy and some tasteful blues harmonica." David Giles from Music Week stated, "Possibly Norman Cook's finest moment since leaving the Housemartins." Frank Owen from Spin declared it as "an exquisite cover", adding further "Beats International has the distinctive languid air of lovers rock. A classy and pertinent fusion, 'Dub Be Good to Me' is similar in execution to the recent British import 'Wishing on a Star' by Fresh Four, featuring Lizz E. That bombed in this country, and so will this probably."

== Chart performance ==
The song spent four weeks at number one on the UK Singles Chart in March 1990. It was the seventh-best-selling single of 1990 in the UK. It also was a number-one hit in Luxembourg and entered the top 10 in Austria, Belgium, Greece, Ireland, the Netherlands, Norway, Spain, Sweden, Switzerland, and West Germany. In Austria, Greece and the Netherlands, the single reached number two. Additionally, it was a top-20 hit in France and top-30 hit in Italy. On the Eurochart Hot 100, "Dub Be Good to Me" reached number three in March 1990. In the United States, it peaked at number one on the Billboard Dance Club Play chart and number 76 on the Billboard Hot 100. In New Zealand and Australia, it reached numbers six and 12, respectively. In West Asia, the song became a number-one hit in Israel, both debuting and peaking in the same week on the chart, on 25 March 1990.

== Retrospective response and legacy ==
AllMusic editor Rick Anderson noted that on "Dub Be Good to Me", the bassline from "Guns of Brixton" is "churning underneath an otherwise relatively faithful rendition" of the SOS Band's "Just Be Good to Me". Writing in Freaky Trigger in 1999, Tom Ewing ranked the song as the 97th best single of the 1990s, and described it as "the Wild Bunch/Massive Attack dub-dance Bristol sound, commercialised before it had even come close to breaking through." Revisiting the single in 2010, he noted "the latent cheekiness of the track – its lifts so flagrant, its components so random – gives it a warmth, a sense of reassurance that despite Layton's desperation everything in Beats International's world is going to be alright." The Smith & Mighty Remix was included in Pitchfork Media's 2010 list of "twenty-five great remixes" of the 1990s. The same year, Professor Green and Lily Allen used the song as a basis for their track "Just Be Good to Green". In 2020, Mixmag included "Dub Be Good to Me" in their list of "The Best Basslines in Dance Music", writing, "As the title suggests, the track is a hefty whomp of dub, powered by a deep, booming bassline that grumbles from start to finish. 30 years later and it still demands a play. Light that BBQ up, it's dub season!" In 2025, Classic Pop magazine ranked it number two in their list of "Top 20 No.1s That Owed a Debt to the 80s".

== Accolades ==
Year	Publisher	Country	Accolade	Rank
1990	Melody Maker	United Kingdom	"End of Year Critic Lists: Singles"	11
2011	Max	Australia	"1000 Greatest Songs of All Time"	372
2011	MTV Dance	United Kingdom	"The 100 Biggest 90's Dance Anthems of All Time"	59
2015	Robert Dimery	United States	"1,001 Songs You Must Hear Before You Die, and 10,001 You Must Download (2015 Update)"	*
2019	Max	Australia	"1000 Greatest Songs of All Time"	630
2020	Mixmag	United Kingdom	"The Best Basslines in Dance Music"	*
2025	Classic Pop	United Kingdom	"Top 20 No.1s That Owed a Debt to the 80s"	2

(*) indicates the list is unordered.

== Track listings ==
- 7-inch single
1. "Dub Be Good to Me" (edit)
2. "Invasion of the Estate Agents"
- 12-inch single
1. "Dub Be Good to Me" (featuring Lindy Layton) (full length)
2. "Just Be Good To Me (a cappella)"
3. "Invasion of the Freestyle: Discuss" (featuring RPM)
4. "Invasion of the Estate Agents"

== Charts ==
=== Weekly charts ===
Chart (1990)	Peak position
Australia (ARIA)	12
Austria (Ö3 Austria Top 40)	2
Belgium (Ultratop 50 Flanders)	5
Canada Dance/Urban (RPM)	4
Europe (Eurochart Hot 100)	3
France (SNEP)	19
Greece (IFPI)	2
Ireland (IRMA)	4
Israel (Israeli Singles Chart)	1
Italy (Musica e dischi)	22
Italy Airplay (Music & Media)	2
Luxembourg (Radio Luxembourg)	1
Netherlands (Dutch Top 40)	2
Netherlands (Single Top 100)	2
New Zealand (Recorded Music NZ)	6
Norway (VG-lista)	10
Spain (AFYVE)	5
Sweden (Sverigetopplistan)	10
Switzerland (Schweizer Hitparade)	16
UK Singles (Official Charts)	1
UK Dance (Music Week)	1
UK Club Chart (Record Mirror)	1
US Billboard Hot 100	76
US 12-inch Singles Sales (Billboard)	15
US Dance Club Play (Billboard)	1
US Hot Black Singles (Billboard)	74
US Cash Box Top 100	69
West Germany (GfK)	4

=== Year-end charts ===
Chart (1990)	Position
Australia (ARIA)	80
Austria (Ö3 Austria Top 40)	30
Belgium (Ultratop 50 Flanders)	36
Canada Dance/Urban (RPM)	47
Europe (Eurochart Hot 100)	14
Germany (Media Control)	38
Israel (Israeli Singles Chart)	24
Netherlands (Dutch Top 40)	19
Netherlands (Single Top 100)	36
New Zealand (RIANZ)	34
Sweden (Topplistan)	49
UK Singles (OCC)	7
UK Club Chart (Record Mirror)	14
US Dance Club Play (Billboard)	22

== Certifications ==
Region	Certification	Certified units/sales
Australia (ARIA)	Gold	35,000^{^}
United Kingdom (BPI)	Gold	400,000^{^}
^{^} Shipments figures based on certification alone.

== See also ==
- List of number-one dance hits (United States)
