= Silly Games =

1979 song by Janet Kay

Single by Janet Kay
- B-side: "Dangerous"
- Released: 1979
- Genre: Lovers rock
- Length: 3:40
- Label: Arawak
- Songwriter: Dennis Bovell
- Producer: Dennis Bovell

"Silly Games" is a song written by Dennis Bovell that was first released in 1979 as a single by English actress and vocalist Janet Kay. The single was a hit not only in the UK, where it reached number two that summer, but throughout Europe. Kay's appearance singing on Top of the Pops made it the first lover's rock tune on BBC Television's flagship popular music show. The song appeared again in 1990 as a re-recording, billed as by Lindy Layton featuring Janet Kay, which reached number 22 in the charts. A remix version of Kay's original recording spent three weeks in the UK singles chart, peaking at No. 62.

== Song background ==
Dennis Bovell has described "Silly Games" as "the story of a bold young lady proposing to a young man. C'mon, we've been giving each other the eye. I know you like me. Stop playing games. In 1978, when I wrote it, almost always the man made the first move." Explaining how he approached the composition, Bovell says: "There was an advert for Memorex where Ella Fitzgerald sang a note and broke a glass, and I wanted a song with a note like that; little girls always try to sing a high note, so when I wrote ‘Silly Games’ and put that high note in there, it meant that every female in the dance would try and sing that note." Now considered an anthem of its genre, "Silly Games" has been called "probably the most popular of the lover's rock songs from the '70s". Bovell has said: "...it was a song constructed with a verse and a chorus and a bridge and a 'tickling piece' at the end and an intro to catch you so you would have to sit up and listen to what was coming next.... To this day, that song is still on the radio constantly. But that song, it was constructed to be a hit."

Bovell played guitar, bass and synthesizer on the recording, while Angus Gaye of Aswad played drums and Janet Kay provided vocals. Bovell initially approached Matumbi drummer Jah Bunny to record the song's drum pattern, but, according to Bovell, Bunny was unwilling to play it as intended. At Kay's suggestion, Bovell recruited Gaye, who introduced an unplanned pause during the song's vocal climax. Bovell retained the pause in the finished recording.

Bovell initially gave the recording to the London reggae label Arawak for release. He later recalled intending to record another lead vocal take before releasing it nationally, but the single was issued before he could do so. Following the song's commercial success, Bovell decided against reusing its drum pattern, believing that another recording using it would have limited commercial appeal and would be poorly received by reggae audiences.

The song features prominently in Steve McQueen's film Lovers Rock, the second film in his 2020 anthology series Small Axe. As The New York Times states, "The lovesick kiss-off 'Silly Games' and its indelible high note play a pivotal part" in the film, and Bovell has a cameo role.

== Critical reception ==
The Guardian said, "Everything about "Silly Games" is perfect: its gently rolling rhythm, its beautiful melody, Dennis Bovell's subtle production, Kay's vocal that goes from understated to indelible."

"Silly Games"

Single by Lindy Layton

from the album Pressure
- Released: 1990
- Length: 4:11
- Label: Arista
- Songwriters: D. Bovell; J. Myatt
- Producer: Martyn Phillips

Lindy Layton singles chronology
"Silly Games" (1990)	"Echo My Heart" (1991)

== Lindy Layton version ==
English singer Lindy Layton debuted as a solo singer in 1990 with her version of "Silly Games", which was released by Arista Records as the first single from her debut album, Pressure (1991). The song was produced by Martyn Phillips and features Janet Kay, peaking at number 22 on the UK Singles Chart.

=== Critical reception ===
Dave Jennings from Melody Maker wrote: "The song is tender and lovely, as anyone who remembers Janet Kay's sensual original will know. Producers Martin Philips and Norman Cook have conjured up a fine, sturdy, shuffling rhythm track." Reviewing Layton's debut album Pressure, he felt the album version of "Silly Games" sounded far more interesting than it did on single, calling it "unpredictably remixed".

=== Charts ===
Chart (1990)	Peak position
Europe (Eurochart Hot 100)	65
Luxembourg (Radio Luxembourg)	17
UK Singles (OCC)	22

== Tricky version ==
The British trip-hop musician Tricky included the song on his 2014 album Adrian Thaws, featuring vocalist Tirzah in a version characterised as "low-slung soul".
