= Janet Kay =

English actor and vocalist (born 1958)

Janet Kay MBE
- Born: Janet Kay Bogle; 17 January 1958 (age 68)
- Origin: Willesden, London, England
- Genres: Reggae; lovers rock
- Occupations: Singer; songwriter; actress
- Years active: 1977–present
- Label: Sony Music Japan
- Website: janetkay.com

Janet Kay Bogle MBE (born 17 January 1958) is an English actress and vocalist, best known for her 1979 lovers rock hit "Silly Games".

== Biography ==
Janet Kay Bogle was born in Willesden, North West London. She was discovered singing impromptu at a rehearsal studio by Tony "Gad" Robinson, keyboardist from the band Aswad, who recommended Kay to Alton Ellis. The Jamaican-born Ellis, a successful rocksteady vocalist, had relocated permanently to London, where he continued to be involved with reggae music and was looking for a female vocalist to record a reggae cover of Minnie Riperton's song "Lovin' You".

In 1978, Kay recorded "I Do Love You" and "That's What Friends Are For". The single "Silly Games", written and produced by Dennis Bovell, was released in 1979 and became a hit across Europe, reaching No. 2 in the UK Singles Chart. The chart success of "Silly Games" led to Kay appearing on Top of the Pops, then the BBC's flagship television music programme. She played the character Angel in the UK sitcom No Problem!, created by the Black Theatre Co-operative (now NitroBeat) and broadcast on Channel 4 (1983–85). While on the programme, she enjoyed a further club hit with "Eternally Grateful" in 1984, which also reached the UK top 100.

Kay has recorded, and co-produced her seventh album for Sony Music Japan. It was released on 18 June 2003, and is entitled Lovin' You … More. The popularity of the song "Lovin' You" in Japan is so strong that she was asked to record it again for this album (for the third time). That version was produced by Omar.

"Silly Games" first hit the UK charts in 1979, and appeared again in 1990 as a re-recording, billed as by Lindy Layton featuring Janet Kay, which reached No. 22. A remix version of Kay's original recording spent three weeks in the UK Singles Chart, peaking at No. 62.

Kay is credited as producer on "Missing You", recorded by Aswad.

She was a founding member (along with Joanne Campbell, Judith Jacob, Suzette Llewellyn, Josephine Melville, Beverley Michaels and Suzanne Packer) of BiBi Crew, Britain's first theatre troupe made up entirely of Black women.

Kay was included on the 2003 list of "100 Great Black Britons".

In November 2022, "Silly Games" was named the runner up in a list of the 70 best number-two singles, compiled by UK newspaper The Guardian to commemorate the 70th anniversary of the UK Singles Chart.

Kay was appointed Member of the Order of the British Empire (MBE) in the 2023 New Year Honours for services to music.

== Discography ==
=== Albums ===
- Capricorn Woman (1982, Arawak)
- So Amazing (1988, Body Music)
- Sweet Surrender (1989, Body Music)
- Lovin' You (1991, Sony Music Japan)
- Love You Always (1993, Sony Music Japan)
- For the Love of You (1994, Sony Music Japan)
- Making History (1998, Sony Music Japan)
- Through the Years (1999, Sony Music Japan)
- Now & Then (2001, Sony Music Japan)
- Lovin' You ... More (2003, Sony Music Japan)
- Idol Kay (2012, Universal Music Japan)
- Dramatic Lovers (2012, Sony Music Japan)

=== Singles ===
Year	Song	UK	Certifications
1978	"Loving You"	—	
1979	"Silly Games"	2	BPI: Silver
1979	"Closer to You"	—	
1982	"You Bring the Sun Out"	—	
1984	"Eternally Grateful"	86	
1985	"Fight Life"	—	
1987	"No Easy Walk to Freedom"	―	
1990	"Silly Games" (remix)	62	
"—" denotes releases that did not chart.
