= Speakers and Tweeters =

Studio album by Dub Pistols
- Released: April 2, 2007
- Label: Sunday Best
- Producers: Barry Ashworth, Jason O'Bryan

Dub Pistols chronology
Six Million Ways to Live (2005)	Speakers and Tweeters (2007)	Rum & Coke (2009)

Professional ratings
Review scores
Source	Rating
AbsolutePunk.net	79%
Allmusic	4.5/5 stars
PopMatters	6/10 stars

Speakers and Tweeters (2007) is the third studio album released by London-based band Dub Pistols. Many of the tracks feature vocals by The Specials' singer Terry Hall.

== Track listing ==
All songs co-written by band members Barry Ashworth, T. K. Lawrence, and Jason O'Bryan unless otherwise indicated:

1. "Speed of Light" (feat. Blade) - 4:08
2. "Peaches" (feat. Rodney P & Terry Hall) - 3:13 (J.J. Burnel, Hugh Cornwell, Brian Duffy, Dave Greenfield)
3. "Speakers and Tweeters" - 3:50
4. "Running from the Thoughts" (feat. Terry Hall) - 4:12
5. "Rapture" (feat. Terry Hall) - 3:54 (Debbie Harry, Chris Stein)
6. "Cruise Control" - 3:29
7. "Open" - 4:10
8. "You'll Never Find" (feat. Rodney P) - 4:23 (Kenneth Gamble, Leon Huff)
9. "Gangsters" (feat. Terry Hall) - 3:01 (Bradbury, Byers, Campbell, Dammers, Golding, Hall, Panter, Staple)
10. "Something to Trust" (feat. Rodney P) - 3:33 (Ashworth, O'Bryan, Rodney P)
11. "Mach 10" - 3:47 (Ashworth, James Dewees, Lawrence, O'Bryan)
12. "Stronger" - 3:54 (Ashworth, Ronnie Black, Lawrence, O'Bryan)
13. "Gave You Time" - 3:45
14. "You'll Never Find" (Dub) - 4:16 [bonus track]
15. "Stronger" (Dub) - 3:28 [bonus track]
