= Lindy Layton =

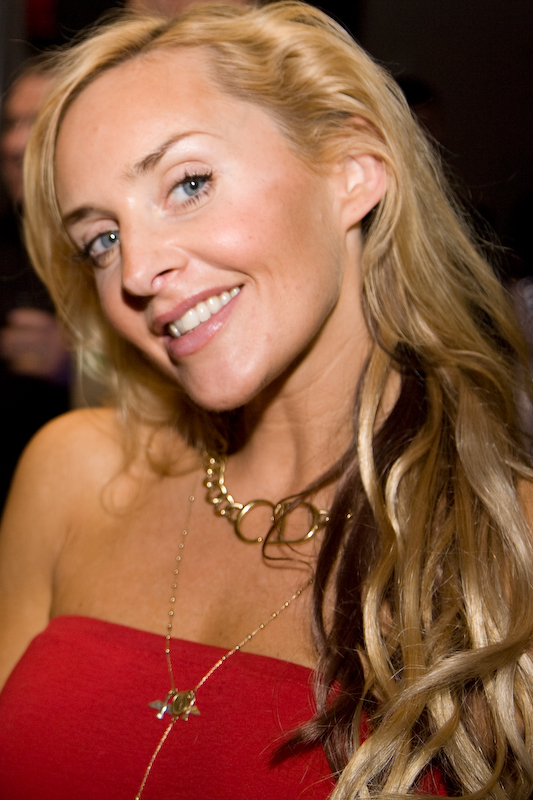
- Layton in 2008

Background information
- Born: Belinda Kimberly Layton; 7 December 1970 (age 55); Hammersmith, London, England
- Genres: Electronic
- Occupation: Singer
- Instrument: Vocals
- Years active: 1989–present
- Labels: Arista; Cutting Edge; Debut; PWL

Belinda Kimberly "Lindy" Layton (born 7 December 1970) is an English singer. She was a founding member of and vocalist for dance music band Beats International. She has released a number of solo albums and singles and worked with other musicians, more recently including Hardknox and Dub Pistols.

== Career ==
Layton attended the Barbara Speake Stage School in the 1980s and appeared as an actor in TV shows such as Casualty and Press Gang (though many people have mistaken the latter for an appearance in Grange Hill on BBC One, getting Layton mixed up with the actress Lindy Brill, who had also played a character called Cathy (Hargreaves)). In the early 1990s, Layton was part of Norman Cook's dance music collective Beats International, which featured her as lead vocalist on a couple of singles, including the number-one hit "Dub Be Good to Me". Beats International's debut album, Let Them Eat Bingo, sold moderately.

Following the success of the singles with Beats International in 1990, Layton signed a solo deal with Arista, and released her version of Janet Kay's hit "Silly Games". The single was a hit, and further releases followed from her 1991 debut album Pressure. However, these decreased in popularity. Pressure was mostly produced by Norman Cook and the dance-soul-funk outfit Driza Bone. The album's second single, "Echo My Heart", narrowly missed a UK Top 40 placing in January 1991, while "Wait for Love" produced by Norman Cook failed to reach the UK Top 75 Singles Chart altogether, in April of that year.

Layton's summer 1991 release of "Without You (One and One)" followed, again produced by Driza Bone. "Without You (One and One)" sold better than Layton's previous single, but failed to reach the Top 40. Layton released a one-off single for Debut Records in 1992. "I'll Be a Freak for You" was not a UK Top 75 chart hit. The following year, Layton re-emerged with a new deal with PWL. The new material was more commercial, and two single releases of minor chart success were released in the UK: "We Got the Love" and "Show Me". Without the expected profitable return, Layton parted company with PWL.

In Japan she released a pop-reggae album, No Other Star, in 1996, and went on to release other work as Hardknox with fellow DJ Steve Proctor the same year. They were signed to Skint Records and released their debut single "Coz I Can" which was given "Single of the Week" honours by NME. The group's second effort, the "Psychopath" EP, received the same recognition. After various performing remixes for artists such as Orgy, Crystal Method, and Faith No More, plus appearing on a various compilations and mixes, a self-titled LP was released in 1999 by Jive Electro.

Layton guested on three tracks on the 2009 Groove Diggerz album Money for Good Times: "Weirdness", "Just Be Good to Me" (a reworking of her Beats International hit "Dub Be Good to Me"), and "Body Flow", for which she also shared a writing credit.

She guested with the Dub Pistols in May 2009, reprising "Dub Be Good to Me", at their support slot to the Specials at the O_{2} Academy Brixton. She guested again with the Dub Pistols at Rock the River 2009, a wakeboard and music festival held on the quay of World Heritage Site, Conwy. She also appeared with the Dub Pistols at the last Glade Festival in 2009. Layton has also recorded with the band, appearing alongside Rodney P on the single "I'm in Love" from their 2009 album Rum & Coke and "Rock Steady" from the 2013 LP Worshipping the Dollar. In 2013, she began a daytime radio show on Kane FM with Mel Foster, The Mrs, which ran for about a year. She is now a songwriter and composes with her writing partner Matt Kootchi, who owns and runs house label Good Lucky Recordings.

== Singles ==
| Year | Single | Peak positions | | Album |
| Year | Single | UK | NED | Album |
|---|---|---|---|---|
| 1990 | "Silly Games" (featuring Janet Kay) | 22 | — | Pressure |
| 1991 | "Echo My Heart" | 42 | 61 | Pressure |
| 1991 | "Wait for Love" | 84 | — | Pressure |
| 1991 | "Without You (One and One)" | 71 | — | Pressure |
| 1992 | "I'll Be a Freak for You" | 89 | — | Singles only |
| 1993 | "We Got the Love" | 38 | — | Singles only |
| 1993 | "Show Me" | 47 | — | Singles only |
| 1996 | "Who Do You Think You Are?" (Japan only) | – | — | No Other Star |
"—" denotes releases that did not chart or were not released.
