= Is It 'Cos I'm Cool? =

2004 single by Mousse T.

- German and Australian artwork

Single by Mousse T. featuring Emma Lanford

from the album All Nite Madness
- Released: 16 February 2004
- Length: 3:47 (original mix)
- Label: Peppermint Jam
- Songwriters: Mousse T.; Errol Rennalls
- Producer: Mousse T.

Mousse T. singles chronology
| "Let's Go to Bed" (2003) | "Is It 'Cos I'm Cool?" (2004) | "Pop Muzak" (2004) |

Alternative cover
- One of the UK variant artworks

"Is It 'Cos I'm Cool?" is a single released by German DJ Mousse T. from his second album, All Nite Madness (2004). The song features vocals from Emma Lanford and became Mousse T.'s third top-10 hit on the UK Singles Chart, reaching number nine. Elsewhere, the song reached the top 20 in Austria, Finland, and Italy and peaked within the top 50 in several other countries.

== Track listings ==
German maxi-CD single

1. "Is It 'Cos I'm Cool?" (original mix) – 3:47
2. "Is It 'Cos I'm Cool?" (So Phat! radio edit) – 3:45
3. "Is It 'Cos I'm Cool?" (Theme of Cool) – 5:54
4. "Is It 'Cos I'm Cool?" (So Phat! remix) – 6:38
5. "Is It 'Cos I'm Cool?" (Torso Gets Cool mix) – 6:29
6. CD ROM-Part (includes two videos and exclusive access to Shakedown Tangerine mix)

UK CD1

1. "Is It 'Cos I'm Cool?" (radio edit) – 3:46
2. "Is It 'Cos I'm Cool?" (Gaudino & Jerma radio edit) – 3:30

UK CD2

1. "Is It 'Cos I'm Cool?" (radio edit) – 3:46
2. "Is It 'Cos I'm Cool?" (Dino Lenny remix) – 6:53
3. "Is It 'Cos I'm Cool?" (Moonbootica mix) – 6:14
4. "Is It 'Cos I'm Cool?" (So Phat! remix) – 6:38
5. "Is It 'Cos I'm Cool?" (Gaudino & Jerma extended mix) – 5:46
6. "Is It 'Cos I'm Cool?" (Torso Gets Cool mix) – 5:46
7. "Is It 'Cos I'm Cool?" (video)

UK 12-inch single

A1. "Is It 'Cos I'm Cool?" (Dino Lenny remix) – 6:53
A2. "Is It 'Cos I'm Cool?" (Shakedown Tangerine mix) – 7:10
B1. "Is It 'Cos I'm Cool?" (So Phat! remix) – 6:38
B2. "Is It 'Cos I'm Cool?" (Moonbootica mix) – 6:14

Australian CD single

1. "Is It 'Cos I'm Cool?" (original mix) – 3:47
2. "Is It 'Cos I'm Cool?" (So Phat! radio edit) – 3:45
3. "Is It 'Cos I'm Cool?" (So Phat! remix) – 6:38
4. "Is It 'Cos I'm Cool?" (Shakedown Tangerine mix) – 4:25
5. "Is It 'Cos I'm Cool?" (original extended mix) – 7:10

== Charts ==
=== Weekly charts ===
| Chart (2004) | Peak position |
|---|---|
| Australia (ARIA) | 44 |
| Australian Club Chart (ARIA) | 7 |
| Austria (Ö3 Austria Top 40) | 12 |
| Belgium (Ultratip Bubbling Under Flanders) | 17 |
| Finland (Suomen virallinen lista) | 13 |
| Germany (GfK) | 33 |
| Ireland (IRMA) | 35 |
| Italy (FIMI) | 15 |
| Netherlands (Single Top 100) | 47 |
| Romania (Romanian Top 100) | 94 |
| Scotland Singles (OCC) | 5 |
| Switzerland (Schweizer Hitparade) | 27 |
| UK Singles (OCC) | 9 |
| UK Dance (OCC) | 9 |
| UK Indie (OCC) | 2 |

=== Year-end charts ===
| Chart (2004) | Position |
|---|---|
| Australian Club Chart (ARIA) | 7 |
| Austria (Ö3 Austria Top 40) | 72 |
| UK Singles (OCC) | 128 |

== Release history ==
| Region | Date | Format(s) | Label(s) | Ref. |
|---|---|---|---|---|
| Germany | 16 February 2004 | CD | Peppermint Jam | |
| United Kingdom | 23 August 2004 | 12-inch vinyl; CD | free2air | |
