= Herman Kelly and Life =

Herman Kelly & Life were a late-1970s modern soul/funk group based in Miami, Florida, whose lone album was executive produced by Cuban-born American Thomas Fundora. Their most notable track, "Dance to the Drummer's Beat", was originally released in 1978 on numerous American and European labels with various mixes and time-lengths. Due to a typographical error, the title of the song was mislabeled as "Dance to the Drummer Beat" on both the Audio Latino and Electric Cat releases. Additionally, the track has appeared on various compilation releases including the heavily sampled breakbeat album entitled Ultimate Breaks and Beats popular among deejays and hip-hop artists. Members of Life included Oliver Wells, Travis Biggs and lead vocalist Aaron McCarthy (aka Jelly). The record and album was promoted worldwide from 1978 to 1980 and has often been sampled since.

== Select US discography ==
Albums

- 1978 ‒ Percussion Explosion LP ‒ Electric Cat (ECS-225), also released on Alston (ALS-4409) and licensed internationally to other labels

Singles

- 1978 ‒ "Dance To The Drummer Beat/Noches Eternas" 7" ‒ Audio Latino (RCAL-598)
- 1978 ‒ "Easy Going/Dance To The Drummer Beat" 7" ‒ Electric Cat (EC-1700)
- 1978 ‒ "Dance To The Drummer Beat (Disco Version)/Easy Going (Noches Eternas) (Disco Version)" 12" ‒ Electric Cat (DEC-1701)
- 1978 ‒ "Dance To The Drummer's Beat/Easy Going" 7" ‒ Alston (ALS-3742)
- 1978 ‒ "Dance To The Drummer's Beat/Easy Going" 12" ‒ T.K. Disco (TKD-100)
