= Beats International =

British dance music band (1989–1992)

- Beats International in 1990. From L to R: Lester Noel, Norman Cook, Lindy Layton, Andy Boucher

Background information
- Origin: Brighton, England
- Genres: Electronic, hip-hop
- Years active: 1989–1992
- Labels: Elektra, Telstar, Go! Beat
- Members: Norman Cook; Lindy Layton; Lester Noel; David John-Baptiste; MC Wildski; Andy Boucher

Beats International were a British dance music band and hip-hop collective, formed in the late 1980s by Norman Cook (later in his career known as Fatboy Slim) based in Brighton, East Sussex, England, after his departure from the Housemartins.

A loose confederation of musicians, the line-up also included vocalist Lindy Layton, former North of Cornwallis vocalist Lester Noel, rappers DJ Baptiste (The Crazy MC), MC Wildski and keyboardist Andy Boucher. Unusually, the band's live line-up also incorporated a graffiti artist, REQ, who painted designs on a backdrop while the musicians played.

== Biography ==
After having a few small hits under his own name such as "Blame It on the Bassline", a 1989 hip-house crossover single featuring MC Wildski, and "For Spacious Lies" with Lester Noel, Cook decided that further releases would be under the collective name "Beats International" – just one of the names he went on to use in the 1990s.

Beats International's debut studio album, Let Them Eat Bingo included these solo hits and the original version of "Won't Talk About It" which featured Billy Bragg singing in a soulful falsetto. The album also spawned the UK number-one single "Dub Be Good to Me", a re-working of the SOS Band's chart-topper "Just Be Good to Me", based on a sample of the bassline from the Clash's "Guns of Brixton". This song was the first to be credited under the Beats International name and featured sometime actor Layton on vocals.

The collective followed their number-one single with a re-recorded version of "Won't Talk About It", which replaced Billy Bragg's vocal with that of Layton and Noel, and "Burundi Blues", a track which featured samples of Bessie Jones, the Thrashing Doves and, on the album version, Brian Cant's introduction from Camberwick Green.

The second Beats International album was 1991's Excursion on the Version, which featured a greater use of dub and reggae sounds, but failed to repeat the success of its predecessor. This was the final Beats International recording, with Cook next going on to form Freak Power.

== Discography ==
=== Albums ===
Year	Album	UK	AUS	US
1990	Let Them Eat Bingo	17	63	162
1991	Excursion on the Version	-	-	-

=== Norman Cook singles ===
Year	Title	Peak chart positions	
Year	Title	UK	NZ
1989	"Won't Talk About It"/"Blame It on the Bassline"^{[II]}	29	36
1989	"For Spacious Lies"	48	-

Note: these singles are from "Let Them Eat Bingo" and would be re-credited to Beats International on this album.

=== Singles ===
Year	Single	Peak positions										Album
Year	Single	UK	NED	BEL (FLA)	FRA	GER	AUT	SWI	SWE	AUS	US	Album
1990	"Dub Be Good to Me"	1	2	5	19	4	2	6	10	12	76	Let Them Eat Bingo
1990	"Won't Talk About It"	9	28	—	—	26	27	24	—	70	76	Let Them Eat Bingo
1990	"Burundi Blues"	51	70	—	—	—	—	—	—	—	—	Let Them Eat Bingo
1990	"For Spacious Lies" (France only)	—	—	—	—	—	—	—	—	—	—	Let Them Eat Bingo
1991	"Echo Chamber"	60	—	—	—	—	—	—	—	169	—	Excursion on the Version
1991	"The Sun Doesn't Shine"	66	—	—	—	87	—	—	—	165	—	Excursion on the Version
1991	"In the Ghetto"	44	—	—	—	89	—	—	—	142	—	Excursion on the Version
1992	"Change Your Mind" (US only)	—	—	—	—	—	—	—	—	—	—	Excursion on the Version
"—" denotes releases that did not chart or were not released.

== Samples list ==
Let Them Eat Bingo

- "Burundi Dub"
  - "Thank You for Talkin' to Me Africa" by Sly & The Family Stone / bassline
- "Dub Be Good to Me"
  - "Just Be Good to Me" by The SOS Band
  - "The Guns of Brixton" by The Clash / bassline
- "Blame It on the Bassline"
  - "Get into Something" by Isley Brothers / phrase "Come on now / give the drummer some"
- "Won't Talk About It"
  - "Thank You Mr. DJ" by Silver Convention / intro
  - "Won't Talk About It" by Billy Bragg / guitar
- "Dance to the Drummer's Beat"
  - "Dance to the Drummer's Beat" by Herman Kelly & Life
- "Tribute to King Tubby"
  - "Unwind Yourself" by Marva Whitney / saxophone in beginning

Excursion on the Version

- "Echo Chamber"
  - "Could You Be Loved" by Bob Marley and the Wailers

== See also ==
- List of Billboard number-one dance club songs
- List of artists who reached number one on the U.S. Dance Club Songs chart
