= Tiger Woods PGA Tour 09 =

2008 video game

- Developers: EA Tiburon; Exient Entertainment (PS2, PSP)
- Publisher: EA Sports
- Series: PGA Tour
- Platforms: PlayStation 2, PlayStation 3, PlayStation Portable, Wii, Xbox 360
- Release: NA: August 26, 2008; AU: August 28, 2008; EU: August 29, 2008
- Genre: Sports
- Modes: Single-player, multiplayer

Tiger Woods PGA Tour 09 is a sports video game developed by EA Tiburon for the PlayStation 3, Wii (titled Tiger Woods PGA 09 All Play) and Xbox 360 versions and Exient Entertainment for the PlayStation 2 and PlayStation Portable versions and published by EA Sports for PlayStation 2, PlayStation 3, PlayStation Portable, Wii and Xbox 360.

== Reception ==
Reception

Aggregate score
Aggregator	Score			
Aggregator	PS3	PSP	Wii	Xbox 360
Metacritic	82/100	53/100	81/100	84/100

Review scores
Publication	Score			
Publication	PS3	PSP	Wii	Xbox 360
Destructoid	9/10	N/A	N/A	N/A
Eurogamer	9/10	N/A	8/10	9/10
Famitsu	26/40	N/A	30/40	26/40
Game Informer	8.5/10	N/A	N/A	8.5/10
GameRevolution	B	N/A	N/A	B
GameSpot	8/10	N/A	8/10	8/10
GameTrailers	N/A	N/A	N/A	7.8/10
GameZone	8/10	5/10	8.5/10	N/A
IGN	8.1/10	5.2/10	8.3/10	8.1/10
Nintendo Power	N/A	N/A	8.5/10	N/A
Official Xbox Magazine (US)	N/A	N/A	N/A	8.5/10
PlayStation: The Official Magazine	3.5/5	N/A	N/A	N/A

Tiger Woods PGA Tour 09 received "mixed or average" reviews on the PlayStation Portable and "generally favorable" reviews on other platforms, according to review aggregator Metacritic.

In Japan, where the PlayStation 3, Xbox 360, and Wii versions were released in 2008 to 2009, Famitsu gave the PS3 and Xbox 360 versions a score of one six, one seven, one six and one seven, for a total of 26 out of 40; the same magazine later gave the Wii version a better score of one seven, one eight, one seven and one eight, for a total of 30 out of 40.

The Wii version was nominated for several Wii-specific awards by IGN in its 2008 video game awards, including Best Sports Game, Best Local Multiplayer Game, Best Online Multiplayer Game, and Best Use of the Wii-Mote.
