= Horny '98 =

1998 single by Mousse T. and Hot 'n' Juicy

Single by Mousse T. vs. Hot 'n' Juicy
- Released: 11 May 1998
- Genre: House
- Length: 3:57
- Label: Peppermint Jam; Edel
- Songwriters: Mousse T.; Errol Rennalls
- Producers: Mousse T.; Reegan King

Mousse T. singles chronology
"Bad Boy" (1997)	"Horny '98" (1998)	"Ooh Song" (1999)

Music video
- "Horny '98" on YouTube

"Horny '98" is a house song by Turkish-German producer Mousse T. featuring British pop duo Hot 'n' Juicy with vocals provided by Inaya Day. It was released as a standalone single in May 1998 and reached No. 2 on the UK Singles Chart the following month, staying on the chart for 17 weeks. The song also reached No. 1 in Italy, No. 2 in New Zealand, and No. 5 in Ireland. It was later included on the South Park soundtrack album Chef Aid: The South Park Album (1998). Two different music videos were produced for the song.

In 2006, a mash-up of the song with "Bohemian Like You" by the Dandy Warhols, titled "Horny as a Dandy", reached No. 17 on the UK Singles Chart, No. 14 in Austria, and No. 10 in Italy.

== Hot 'n' Juicy ==
Hot 'n' Juicy were initially a duo of singers, Emma Lanford and Nadine Richardson. They appeared on the 1998 version of "Horny" and the 2006 mash-up "Horny as a Dandy". They were residents of a tower block on the former Lee Bank estate in Birmingham. They became a trio in late 1998 when they were joined by Nikki Belle, who remained in the group until 1999. After the group split up, Belle went on to provide vocals on a version of Womack & Womack's "Teardrops" for Whelan & Di Scala, a British EDM duo.

== Release ==
Originally called "Horny Track", which was produced with trumpet samples from Earth, Wind & Fire's 1983 songs "Something Special" and "The Speed of Love", the single was actually first released as an instrumental in 1997 on a limited edition 12-inch vinyl as a little "present" for fellow club DJs. The 1998 release, titled "Horny '98", was given a commercial edge after adding vocals by duo Emma Lanford and Nadine Richardson, with Inaya Day, working under the name Hot 'n' Juicy (although only Emma Southam and Nadine Richardson appear in the music video and on the sleeve). Italian house music fans were the first to pick up on the record.

== Critical reception ==
Chuck Taylor from Billboard wrote, "As one of many highlights on the new South Park collection, 'Horny' has the potential to be the novelty smash of the season." He added further, "With lyrics that are ultra-self-explanatory, 'Horny' will either bring a giddy smile or a look of disdain. While it has been wholly embraced by club pundits who tend to appreciate anything cheeky and suggestive, those at radio may find themselves more comfortable distancing themselves from it. Of course, carefree, adventurous types will see 'Horny' as the best thing to come down the pike since Rice Krispies treats. Better yet, perhaps they will simply look to European radio—which treated this as a full-fledged pop record—and turn it into a major hit."

An editor from Daily Record praised it as a "raunchy R&B hit", and "this year's catchiest summer anthem so far." Pan-European magazine Music & Media opined that the music is "tough and sexy with a tight disco beat, screeching horns and an appropriately smouldering vocal. The shadow of Gloria Gaynor looms very, very large over this tune but that's no bad thing..." They also declared the song as a "perfect dance/pop crossover". Mike Goldsmith from NME described it as "such screamingly familiar ear candy". Ziad from the Record Mirror Dance Update gave "Horny '98" five out of five and named it Tune of the Week, writing, "At the heart of it are some very catchy, distinctive string/brass disco stabs, which provide the main hook, and this '98 version sees the addition of a female vocal, basically singing that she's feeling horny. All these are strong ingredients indeed, for what should be a huge record."

== Chart performance ==
The single reached No. 1 on the singles chart in Italy and became a massive summer hit. The track then reached the top position on the German dance chart after some seven weeks. It also peaked at No. 2 in the UK, No. 3 in Scotland, No. 5 in Ireland, No. 9 in Norway, No. 11 in Switzerland and No. 12 in Iceland. On the Eurochart Hot 100, "Horny '98" reached No. 6 in June 1998. Outside Europe, it peaked at No. 2 in New Zealand, No. 12 on the Billboard Maxi-Singles Sales chart in the U.S. and No. 13 in Australia.

== Impact and legacy ==
In 2018, Dave Fawbert from ShortList said, "Completing 1998's sexy one-two, this is the sound of Jumpin' Jaks in Romford in the summer of 1998: the sound of carefree youth, shots for a pound, dancing on the tables and fights outside McDonald's. Wonderful." Tomorrowland featured "Horny '98" in their official list of "The Ibiza 500" in 2020.

== South Park version ==
The song was later included on the South Park soundtrack album Chef Aid: The South Park Album. On Chef Aid, the song opens with a mock phone call between Sid Greenfield (voiced by Trey Parker) and South Park creators, Matt Stone and Trey Parker, talking about putting the song on the album. In the mock phone call (which begins on the previous track, and continues throughout "Horny") Matt and Trey repeatedly voice their dislike for the song, and Sid Greenfield finally agrees not to include it (this being after the song has already finished playing in its entirety).

== Track listings ==
- German CD single
1. "Horny '98" (radio edit) – 3:57
2. "Horny '98" (Boris Gets Horny radio edit) – 2:55
3. "Horny '98" (extended mix) – 6:21
4. "Horny '98" (Boris Gets Horny extended mix) – 9:11
5. "Horny" (original mix) – 5:14
- German 12-inch single

A1. "Horny '98" (extended mix) – 6:21
A2. "Horny" (original mix) – 5:14
B1. "Horny '98" (Boris Gets Horny extended mix) – 9:11
B2. "Horny '98" (radio edit) – 3:57

- European CD single
1. "Horny '98" (radio edit) – 3:57
2. "Horny '98" (extended mix) – 6:21
- UK, Australian, and New Zealand CD single
1. "Horny" (Boris Gets Edited)
2. "Horny '98" (radio edit)
3. "Horny '98" (extended mix)
4. "Horny" (Boris Gets Horny mix)
5. "Horny" (original mix)
6. "Horny" (Elusive dub 1)
- UK 12-inch single

A1. "Horny" (Boris Gets Horny mix)
A2. "Horny" (original mix)
AA1. "Horny '98" (extended mix)
AA2. "Horny" (Elusive dub 1)

- UK cassette single

A1. "Horny '98" (radio edit)
A2. "Horny" (Boris Gets Edited)
B1. "Horny '98" (extended mix)

- US CD and cassette single
1. "Horny" – 3:47
2. "Horny" (Tiefschwarz Gets Horny instrumental mix) – 7:12
3. "Mentally Dull" by Vitro featuring the cast of South Park (Think Tank remix) – 3:45
- US maxi-CD single
1. "Horny" – 3:47
2. "Horny" (Mousse T.'s extended mix) – 6:15
3. "Horny" (Hamburg Gets Horny mix) – 9:11
4. "Horny" (D.Y.M.K. dub) – 7:38
5. "Horny" (Tiefschwarz Gets Horny mix) – 7:12
6. "Horny" (Fused mix) – 5:32
7. "Horny" (a cappella) – 3:47
- US 12-inch single

A1. "Horny" (Mousse T.'s extended mix) – 6:15
A2. "Horny" (Hamburg Gets Horny mix) – 9:11
B1. "Horny" (Tiefschwarz Gets Horny mix) – 7:12
B2. "Horny" (Fused mix) – 5:32
B3. "Horny" (a cappella) – 3:47

== Charts ==
=== Weekly charts ===
Weekly chart performance for "Horny '98"
Chart (1998–1999)	Peak position
Australia (ARIA)	13
Austria (Ö3 Austria Top 40)	17
Belgium (Ultratop 50 Flanders)	28
Belgium (Ultratop 50 Wallonia)	18
Canada Top Singles (RPM)	57
Canada Dance/Urban (RPM)	12
Europe (Eurochart Hot 100)	6
France (SNEP)	55
Germany (GfK)	28
Iceland (Íslenski listinn Topp 40)	12
Ireland (IRMA)	5
Italy (Musica e dischi)	1
Italy Airplay (Music & Media)	2
Netherlands (Dutch Top 40)	23
Netherlands (Single Top 100)	31
New Zealand (Recorded Music NZ)	2
Norway (VG-lista)	9
Scottish Singles Sales (Official Charts)	3
Sweden (Sverigetopplistan)	38
Switzerland (Schweizer Hitparade)	11
UK Singles (Official Charts)	2
UK Dance (Official Charts)	1
UK Indie (Official Charts)	50
US Dance Club Play (Billboard)	23
US Maxi-Singles Sales (Billboard)	12

=== Year-end charts ===
Year-end chart performance for "Horny '98"
Chart (1998)	Position
Australia (ARIA)	34
Europe (Eurochart Hot 100)	57
Europe Border Breakers (Music & Media)	5
New Zealand (RIANZ)	23
UK Singles (OCC)	23
US Maxi-Singles Sales (Billboard)	47

== Certifications ==
Certifications and sales of "Horny '98"
Region	Certification	Certified units/sales
Australia (ARIA)	Platinum	70,000^{^}
New Zealand (RMNZ)	Gold	5,000^{*}
United Kingdom (BPI)	Platinum	600,000^{‡}
^{*} Sales figures based on certification alone.^{^} Shipments figures based on certification alone.^{‡} Sales+streaming figures based on certification alone.

== Release history ==
Release dates and formats for "Horny '98"
Region	Date	Format(s)	Label(s)	Ref.
Germany	11 May 1998	CD	Peppermint Jam; Edel	
United Kingdom	25 May 1998	12-inch vinyl; CD; cassette	AM:PM	

== "Horny as a Dandy" ==
"Horny as a Dandy"

Single by Mousse T. vs. the Dandy Warhols
- Released: 17 March 2006
- Length: 8:18 (original version); 3:18 (radio edit)
- Label: Peppermint Jam
- Songwriters: Mousse T.; Errol Rennalls; Courtney Taylor-Taylor
- Producers: Loo & Placido

Mousse T. singles chronology
"Wow" (2005)	"Horny as a Dandy" (2006)	"All Nite Long (D.I.S.C.O.)" (2009)

The Dandy Warhols singles chronology
"All the Money or the Simple Life Honey" (2005)	"Horny as a Dandy" (2006)	"Have a Kick Ass Summer (Me and My Friends)" (2006)

In 2006, a mash-up between "Horny" and the Dandy Warhols' song "Bohemian Like You" was released as "Horny as a Dandy", featuring vocals from Hot 'n' Juicy. The mash-up was released in Germany on 17 March 2006 and was issued throughout the world in mid-2006. The song peaked at number 17 on the UK Singles Chart, number 13 in Austria, and number 10 in Italy. Two versions of the song appear on the first CD single: the original mash-up version produced by Loo & Placido and a new version produced by Mousse T. featuring a re-recorded sample of "Bohemian Like You" with the Dandy Warhols providing the vocals and instrumentation.

In 2019, Dandy Warhols lead singer Courtney Taylor-Taylor told VICE that he really liked the mashup. "It was exciting, particularly the timing, because the momentum of “Bohemian” had kinda faded and music was more into the new wave thing," he said. "We had no record at the time and it gave us new life. It was fun when it came out and hearing a chick sing “Horny” was campy and fun. If we did that we would’ve been poo-pooed for being misogynist."

=== Charts ===
Weekly chart performance for "Horny as a Dandy"
Chart (2006)	Peak position
Australia (ARIA)	30
Austria (Ö3 Austria Top 40)	13
Belgium (Ultratop 50 Flanders)	37
Germany (GfK)	40
Ireland (IRMA)	22
Italy (FIMI)	10
Netherlands (Single Top 100)	38
Scottish Singles Sales (Official Charts)	13
Switzerland (Schweizer Hitparade)	30
UK Singles (Official Charts)	17

=== Release history ===
Release dates and formats for "Horny as a Dandy"
Region	Date	Format(s)	Label(s)	Ref.
Germany	17 March 2006	CD	Peppermint Jam	
Australia	12 June 2006	CD	Peppermint Jam	
United Kingdom	7 August 2006	CD	Feverpitch	

== Cover versions ==
- In 2016, Australian band the Potbelleez featuring Zoë Badwi released a cover version of the song, known simply as "Horny".
