= 1998 in animation =

1998 in animation is an overview of notable events, including notable awards, list of films released, television show debuts and endings, and notable deaths.

== Events ==
=== February ===
- February 24: The Cow and Chicken season 2 episode "Buffalo Gals" airs. It gained controversy and was quickly pulled for lesbian stereotyping and sexual innuendo.
- February 25: South Park concludes its first season on Comedy Central with the episode "Cartman's Mom Is a Dirty Slut", which leaves the show on a cliffhanger.

=== March ===
- March 2: Cartoon Network ends its "Starburst" era and begins its very iconic "Powerhouse" era.
- March 15: The first episode of PB&J Otter airs.
- March 23: 70th Academy Awards: Geri's Game by Jan Pinkava wins the Academy Award for Best Animated Short.

=== April ===
- April 1: Season 2 of South Park begins on Comedy Central with the premiere of the episode "Terrance and Phillip in Not Without My Anus", the season's premiere angered a lot of fans of the show as they've been waiting for the reveal of Eric Cartman's father since the end of Season 1's "Cartman's Mom Is a Dirty Slut".
- April 3: The first episode of Cowboy Bebop airs.
- April 4: The first episodes of CatDog and Yu-Gi-Oh! air.
- April 20: The first episode of Stressed Eric airs.
- April 22: The South Park episode "Cartman's Mom Is Still a Dirty Slut" premieres on Comedy Central, which finally follows up from the events of "Cartman's Mom Is a Dirty Slut". The episode was seen by over 6 million viewers, making it the #1 prime-time program at its premiere.
- April 26: The Simpsons airs its 200th episode, "Trash of the Titans", guest starring the band U2 and actor Steve Martin.

=== May ===
- May 14: The first episode of Celebrity Deathmatch is broadcast.
- May 15: Quest for Camelot is released.
- May 17:
- The Simpsons concludes its ninth season on Fox with the episode "Natural Born Kissers". It was seen by over 14 million viewers that night.
- King of the Hill concludes its second season on Fox with the episode "Propane Boom", which leaves the show on a major cliffhanger. It was seen by over 16 million viewers that night.
- May 28: American voice actor Phil Hartman (voice of Troy McClure and Lionel Hutz in The Simpsons) is murdered by his wife who was under the influence of drugs, and committed suicide afterward.
- May 29: Season 5 of Rugrats begins on Nickelodeon with the premiere of the half-hour special "Vacation".

=== June ===
- June 19: The Walt Disney Company releases Mulan. One of the pre-2010s Disney films to perceive the LGBT representation, later confirming Mulan's love interest Li Shang to be bisexual, yet condemned by Disney in response of #MeToo Movement.
- June 22: The first episode of Bob and Margaret is broadcast.

=== July ===
- July 19: The first episode of Oh Yeah! Cartoons airs.
- July 21: The first episode of Lascars airs.
- July 24: Roy O. Disney receives a star at the Hollywood Walk of Fame.

=== August ===
- August 18: The Rugrats episode "The Word of the Day" premieres on Nickelodeon.
- August 23: Season 10 of The Simpsons begins on Fox with the premiere of the episode "Lard of the Dance". It was seen by over 11.8 million viewers that night.
- August 31: The first episode of Disney's Hercules is broadcast.

=== September ===
- September 1: The first episodes of Cousin Skeeter and The Wild Thornberrys premiere on Nickelodeon.
- September 4: The first episode of Archibald the Koala airs.
- September 6: The Oh Yeah! Cartoons short "The Fairly OddParents!" premieres on Nickelodeon. The short ended up getting its own series nearly 3 years later.
- September 12: The first episode of Godzilla: The Series airs.
- September 14:
  - The first episode of Histeria! airs.
  - The first episode of Little Monsters airs.
- September 15: Season 3 of King of the Hill begins on Fox with the premiere of the episode "Propane Boom II: Death of a Propane Salesman", which follows up from the events of the Season 2 finale "Propane Boom". The episode was seen by over 10.9 million viewers that night.
- September 21: The Rugrats half-hour special "The Family Tree" premieres on Nickelodeon, this episode serves as the prologue to The Rugrats Movie.
- September 22: Scooby-Doo on Zombie Island is released. This marks the first reunion of the Mystery Gang since The New Scooby-Doo Mysteries in 1984. The film makes its television debut on Cartoon Network's Cartoon Theatre on Halloween this year. This also mark the first-ever Scooby-Doo movie to be released in a direct-to-video format and became one of the best-selling DTV films of all time.
- September 27: The Simpsons episode "Bart the Mother" premieres, featuring the last speaking appearance of Troy McClure after Phil Hartman's death on May 28, 1998. The character was retired after this episode. This is also the last episode David X. Cohen wrote before leaving the series to work on Futurama. However, he later wrote the season 32 episode "Podcast News" in 2020.

=== October ===
- Specific date unknown: The Japanese animation studio Bones is founded.
- October 2: DreamWorks Animation's first film, Antz, directed by Eric Darnell and Tim Johnson, is released.
- October 3: The first episode of Anatole airs.
- October 4: The first episode of Rolie Polie Olie airs.
- October 5: The first episode of Ojarumaru airs.
- October 9: The first episode of The Wacky Adventures of Ronald McDonald airs.
- October 25: The Simpsons' "Treehouse of Horror IX" premieres on Fox.
- October 27: Disney's The Lion King II: Simba's Pride is released, receiving mixed to positive reviews.

=== November ===
- November 2: Chris Wedge's Bunny is first released.
- November 8: The Simpsons episode "When You Dish Upon a Star" premieres, which had a cutaway at the end which showed the 20th Century Fox studio with "A division of The Walt Disney Co." at the bottom of the studio sign. This episode would get renewed attention 21 years later after Disney's acquisition of Fox in 2019.
- November 10: Rugrats concludes its fifth season on Nickelodeon with the premiere of the thanksgiving special "The Turkey Who Came to Dinner".
- November 16:
  - Steamboat Willie is added to the National Film Registry.
  - An American Tail: The Treasure of Manhattan Island, the direct-to-video sequel to An American Tail, premieres in United Kingdom as the film for the United States release went into delay for over a year. Some countries, including Germany and Japan, released it as the next film after The Mystery of the Night Monster.
- November 18:
  - The first episode of The Powerpuff Girls airs on Cartoon Network. It became one of the most popular cartoons on the network in the decade.
  - The Hey Arnold! episode "Arnold's Thanksgiving" airs, which gained notoriety for its allegations of Mr. Simmons' sexuality, suspecting him of having a same-sex relationship with his partner. This was later confirmed by Craig Bartlett.
- November 20:
  - Paramount Pictures and Nickelodeon's The Rugrats Movie premieres. The film received mixed reviews and gained some notoriety for its thematic material subjecting in a G-rated movie at its time. The movie marks the debut of Tommy's little brother, Dil Pickles.
  - The film A Bug's Life by Pixar and the Walt Disney Company airs. There was a legal battle between Pixar and DreamWorks regarding the comparisons with this film and Antz.

=== December ===
- December 9: Michel Ocelot's Kirikou and the Sorceress premieres.
- December 16: The South Park episode "Gnomes" first airs, in which Tweek Meak makes his debut.
- December 18: The film The Prince of Egypt premieres.
- December 21: The first episode of Rex the Runt airs.
- December 22: MGM's The Secret of NIMH 2: Timmy to the Rescue, the direct-to-video sequel to Don Bluth's The Secret of NIMH, is released. It was brutally panned by audiences and critics for its deliberate neglect of the original source material and is declared to be one of the worst DTV sequels ever made.
- December 23: Enzo D'Alò's Lucky and Zorba premieres.

=== Specific date unknown ===
- Mikhail Tumelya's The Magic Pipe is released.
- The first episode of Fat Dog Mendoza airs.
- The pilot episode of The Proud Family was created. It was originally set to air on Nickelodeon next year, but did not pass through as the series would instead air on Disney Channel in 2001.
- The final episode of Stickin' Around airs.

== Films released ==
- January 6 - Hercules and Xena – The Animated Movie: The Battle for Mount Olympus (United States)
- January 16 - H.C. Andersen's The Long Shadow (Denmark)
- February 6 - General Chaos: Uncensored Animation (United States)
- February 17:
  - Belle's Magical World (United States)
  - Camelot (United States)
- March 7:
  - Doraemon: Nobita's South Sea Adventure (Japan)
  - Galaxy Express 999: Eternal Fantasy (Japan)
- March 17:
  - Batman & Mr. Freeze: SubZero (United States)
  - FernGully 2: The Magical Rescue (United States)
- April 3 - Grandma and Her Ghosts (Taiwan)
- April 18:
  - Crayon Shin-chan: Blitzkrieg! Pig's Hoof's Secret Mission (Japan)
  - Detective Conan: The Fourteenth Target (Japan)
- April 21 - FAKE (Japan)
- April 24 - Królestwo Zielonej Polany. Powrót (Poland)
- April 25 - MAZE ☆ The Mega-Burst Space: The Giant of Temporary Threat (Japan)
- May 2 - Camelot: The Legend (United States)
- May 15 - Quest for Camelot (United States)
- May 18 - The Brave Little Toaster Goes to Mars (United States and United Kingdom)
- May 20 - Socialisation of the Bull? (Slovenia)
- May 21 - Golgo 13: Queen Bee (Japan)
- May 26 - The Legend of Su-Ling (United States)
- June 16 - The Mighty Kong (United States)
- June 19:
  - Mulan (United States)
  - A Tale of Egypt (United States)
- July 13 - Moses: Egypt's Great Prince (United States)
- July 14 - The Spirit of Mickey (Australia)
- July 17:
  - Ahmed, Prince of Alhambra (Spain)
  - Gen^{13} (United States)
- July 18 - Pokémon: The First Movie – Mewtwo Strikes Back (Japan)
- July 21:
  - The Animated Adventures of Tom Sawyer (United States)
  - VeggieTales: Madame Blueberry (United States)
- July 24 - Lupin III: Crisis in Tokyo (Japan)
- July 25 - Soreike! Anpanman Tenohira o Taiyō ni (Japan)
- August 1:
  - Gundam Wing: Endless Waltz -Special Edition- (Japan)
  - Mobile Suit Gundam: The 08th MS Team – Miller's Report (Japan)
  - Slayers Gorgeous (Japan)
- August 4 - The Swan Princess: The Mystery of the Enchanted Kingdom (United States)
- August 7 - Gurin with the Foxtail (Norway)
- August 25 - Pocahontas II: Journey to a New World (United States)
- August 27 - Silant Legend (Malaysia)
- September 4 - What Neighbours are Animals! (Spain)
- September 5 - Spriggan (Japan)
- September 22 - Scooby-Doo on Zombie Island (United States)
- October 2 - Antz (United States)
- October 13 - Buster & Chauncey's Silent Night (United States)
- October 16 - Rudolph the Red-Nosed Reindeer: The Movie (United States)
- October 27 - The Lion King II: Simba's Pride (United States)
- November 7 - Visitor (Japan)
- November 8 - Reise um die Erde in 80 Tagen (China and Germany)
- November 16 - An American Tail: The Treasure of Manhattan Island (United States)
- November 17:
  - An All Dogs Christmas Carol (United States)
  - Money, A Mythology of Darkness (Greece)
- November 20:
  - A Bug's Life (United States)
  - The Rugrats Movie (United States)
- November 24 - VeggieTales: The End of Silliness? (United States)
- December 1 - The Land Before Time VI: The Secret of Saurus Rock (United States)
- December 4 - Circleen: City Mouse (Denmark)
- December 9 - Kirikou and the Sorceress (France, Belgium and Luxembourg)
- December 11 - Touch: Miss Lonely Yesterday (Japan)
- December 18:
  - Fire Force DNAsights 999.9 (Japan)
  - The Prince of Egypt (United States)
- December 19 - Beast Wars II: Lio Convoy's Close Call! (Japan)
- December 22 - The Secret of NIMH 2: Timmy to the Rescue (United States)
- December 23 - Lucky and Zorba (Italy)
- December 25 - Luminous Visions (United States)
- Specific date unknown:
  - Ancient Alien (United States)
  - Camelot (Australia)
  - Greatest Heroes and Legends of the Bible: Daniel and the Lion's Den (United States)
  - Greatest Heroes and Legends of the Bible: David and Goliath (United States)
  - Greatest Heroes and Legends of the Bible: The Garden of Eden (United States)
  - Greatest Heroes and Legends of the Bible: Jonah and the Whale (United States)
  - Greatest Heroes and Legends of the Bible: The Last Supper, Crucifixion and Resurrection (United States)
  - Greatest Heroes and Legends of the Bible: The Miracles of Jesus (United States)
  - Greatest Heroes and Legends of the Bible: Samson and Delilah (United States)
  - Greatest Heroes and Legends of the Bible: The Story of Moses (United States)
  - The Legend of Mulan (Netherlands)
  - The Little Mermaid (Australia)
  - The Magic Forest (Germany)
  - The Magic Pipe (Russia)
  - Mu-lan (Italy)
  - Mulan (Australia)
  - Otoko wa Tsurai yo: Torajirō Wasure na Kusa (Japan)
  - Prince of the Nile: The Story of Moses (Australia)
  - The Story of Rennyo (Japan)
  - Le Voyage de la Souris (France)

== Television series debuts ==
Date	Title	Channel	Year
January 6	The New Chucklewood Critters	N/A	1998–1999
February 7	Silver Surfer	Fox Kids	1998
February 7	Toonsylvania	Fox Kids	1998–1999
February 7	Ned's Newt	Fox Kids	1998–1999
March 1	The Country Mouse and the City Mouse Adventures	HBO	1998–1999
March 15	PB&J Otter	Playhouse Disney	1998–2000
April 1	Trigun	TV Tokyo	1998
April 3	Cowboy Bebop	TV Tokyo	1998–1999
April 4	CatDog	Nickelodeon	1998–2005
May 14	Celebrity Deathmatch	MTV	1998–2007
June 8	Invasion America	The WB	1998
July 18	Bad Dog	The Family Channel	1998–2000
July 19	Oh Yeah! Cartoons	Nickelodeon	1998–2000
August 15	Donkey Kong Country	Fox Family	1998–2000
August 15	Monster Farm	Fox Family	1998–1999
August 15	Walter Melon	Fox Family	1998–1999
August 18	Ohh Nooo! Mr. Bill Presents	Fox Family	1998–1999
August 31	Hercules	ABC	1998–1999
September 1	The Wild Thornberrys	Nickelodeon	1998–2004
September 5	The Secret Files of the Spy Dogs	Fox Kids	1998–1999
September 7	RoboCop: Alpha Commando	Syndication	1998–1999
September 8	Pokémon: Indigo League	Syndication, Kids' WB	1998–2000
September 12	Godzilla: The Series	Fox Kids	1998–2000
September 12	Mad Jack the Pirate	Fox Kids	1998–1999
September 12	The Mr. Potato Head Show	Fox Kids	1998–1999
September 12	Oggy and the Cockroaches	Fox Kids	1998–2019
September 14	Histeria!	Kids' WB	1998–2000
September 16	Shadow Raiders	Syndication	1998–1999
September 18	Voltron: The Third Dimension	Syndication	1998–2000
September 19	Pinky, Elmyra & the Brain	Kids' WB	1998–1999
September 19	Anatole	CBS	1998–1999
September 19	Dumb Bunnies	CBS	1998–1999
September 19	Mythic Warriors	CBS	1998–2000
September 19	The Lionhearts	Syndication	1998
September 30	Elliot Moose	PBS	1998–2000
October 3	Birdz	CBS	1998–1999
October 3	Flying Rhino Junior High	CBS	1998–2000
October 4	Rolie Polie Olie	Playhouse Disney	1998–2004
October 5	Noddy	PBS	1998–2000
October 9	The Wacky Adventures of Ronald McDonald	VHS	1998–2003
October 10	Brats of the Lost Nebula	Kids' WB	1998–1999
October 10	Ketchup: Cats Who Cook	NHK Educational TV, Nine Network, Network 10	1998–1999
November 2	Jay Jay the Jet Plane	TLC, PBS Kids	1998–2005
November 18	The Powerpuff Girls	Cartoon Network	1998–2005
December 21	Rex the Runt	BBC Two	1998–2001

== Television series endings ==
Date	Title	Channel	Year	Notes
January 4	Inspector Gadget's Field Trip	The History Channel	1996–1998	Cancelled
January 10	Jungle Cubs	ABC	1996–1998	Cancelled
January 31	Spider-Man (1994)	Fox Kids	1994–1998	Cancelled
February 23	Bobby's World	Fox Kids	1990–1998	Ended
February 25	Channel Umptee-3	Kids' WB	1997–1998	Cancelled
March 2	Life with Louie	Fox Kids	1994–1998	Ended
March 4	101 Dalmatians: The Series	ABC	1997–1998	Cancelled
March 7	Gadget Boy & Heather	Syndication, The History Channel	1995–1998	Cancelled
March 27	Big Bag	Cartoon Network	1996–1998	Cancelled
April 25	The Adventures of Sam & Max: Freelance Police	Fox Kids	1997–1998	Cancelled
May 16	Silver Surfer	Fox Kids	1998	Cancelled
June 26	Salty's Lighthouse	TLC	1997–1998	Cancelled
July 7	Invasion America	The WB	1998	Cancelled
October 17	The Spooktacular New Adventures of Casper	Fox Kids	1996–1998	Cancelled
November 6	All Dogs Go to Heaven: The Series	Syndication, Fox Family	1996–1998	Cancelled
November 14	Animaniacs	Kids' WB	1993–1998	Ended
November 14	Pinky and the Brain	Kids' WB	1995–1998	Ended
December 12	The Lionhearts	Syndication	1998	Cancelled

== Television season premieres ==
Date	Title	Season	Channel
March 1	The Angry Beavers	2	Nickelodeon
April 1	South Park	2	Comedy Central
May 29	Rugrats	5	Nickelodeon
August 23	The Simpsons	10	Fox
August 31	Hey Arnold!	3	Nickelodeon
September 12	Doug	7	ABC
September 12	Recess	2	ABC
September 14	Pinky and the Brain	4	Kids' WB (The WB)
September 15	King of the Hill	3	Fox
September 19	The Sylvester & Tweety Mysteries	4	Kids' WB (The WB)

== Television season finales ==
Date	Title	Season	Channel
January 17	Recess	1	ABC
February 25	South Park	1	Comedy Central
May 16	Pinky and the Brain	3	Kids' WB (The WB)
May 16	The Sylvester & Tweety Mysteries	3	Kids' WB (The WB)
May 17	King of the Hill	2	Fox
May 17	The Simpsons	9	Fox
June 15	Dexter's Laboratory	2	Cartoon Network
October 29	CatDog	1	Nickelodeon
November 10	Rugrats	5	Nickelodeon
November 21	The Angry Beavers	2	Nickelodeon

== Births ==
=== January ===
- January 23: Rachel Crow, American singer and actress (voice of Carla in Rio 2, Tip in Home: Adventures with Tip & Oh, Imara in The Lion Guard episode "Return to the Pride Lands").
- January 28: Ariel Winter, American actress (voice of Sofia in Sofia the First, Gretchen in Phineas and Ferb, Marina in Jake and the Never Land Pirates, Carrie Kelley in Batman: The Dark Knight Returns).
- January 31: Chills, Canadian internet personality and singer (voice of Patron in Smiling Friends).

=== February ===
- February 9: Isabella Gomez, Colombian-American actress (voice of Megan Cruz in Big Hero 6: The Series, Teenage Mariposa Diaz in the Star vs. the Forces of Evil episode "Gone Baby Gone").
- February 15: Zachary Gordon, American actor (voice of Little Lopart in Handy Manny, San San in Ni Hao, Kai-Lan, Kotaro in Afro Samurai: Resurrection, Matt Mattin in Star Wars Rebels, first voice of Gil in Bubble Guppies).
- February 21: Zach Aguilar, American actor (voice of Genos in One Punch Man, Tanjiro Kamado in Demon Slayer: Kimetsu no Yaiba, Koichi Hirose in JoJo's Bizarre Adventure: Diamond Is Unbreakable, Arthur Pendragon in The Seven Deadly Sins, Joyride in Power Players).

=== April ===
- April 6: Peyton List, American actress (voice of Barbara Gordon in Batman: Hush, Emma Ross in the Ultimate Spider-Man episode "Halloween Night at the Museum", Sabrina Spellman in the Robot Chicken episode "Endgame").
- April 9: Elle Fanning, American actress (voice of Mei Kusakabe in My Neighbor Totoro, Grace in Astro Boy, Winnie in The Boxtrolls, Félicie Le Bras in Ballerina, Sarah, Logan's Friend and Nerd's Wife in the Robot Chicken episode "May Cause the Need for Speed").

=== May ===
- May 7: MrBeast, American YouTuber and philanthropist (voice of Times Square Bystander in Teenage Mutant Ninja Turtles: Mutant Mayhem, Panda Pig in Kung Fu Panda 4).
- May 23: Ramona Young, American actress (voice of Sweetie in Wendell & Wild, Bliss in Ruby Gillman, Teenage Kraken, Fox Spirit in the Gremlins: Secrets of the Mogwai episode "Always Buy a God a Drink First").

=== June ===
- June 11: Charlie Tahan, American actor (voice of Victor Frankenstein in Frankenweenie).
- June 19: Atticus Shaffer, American actor (voice of Edgar in Frankenweenie, Ono in The Lion Guard, Peedee Fryman in Steven Universe, Fox in Home: Adventures with Tip and Oh, Dennis in Star vs. the Forces of Evil, Albert Glass in Fish Hooks, Melvin in Harvey Girls Forever!).
- June 24: Soma Chhaya, Canadian-American singer, rapper and actress (voice of Shauzia in The Breadwinner).

=== July ===
- July 8:
  - Maya Hawke, American actress and singer-songwriter (voice of Anxiety in Inside Out 2, Abyss in Moon Girl and Devil Dinosaur).
  - Jaden Smith, American rapper and actor (voice of Kaz Kaan in Neo Yokio, Jordan in Entergalactic, College Myron in The Proud Family: Louder and Prouder episode "When You Wish Upon a Roker").
- July 22: Madison Pettis, American actress (voice of Katie and Tara in Special Agent Oso, Adyson Sweetwater in Phineas and Ferb, Izzy in Jake and the Never Land Pirates, Zuri in The Lion Guard, Bridgette in Fancy Nancy, Olivia in Mickey and the Roadster Racers, Cassandra in the Sofia the First episode "The Lost Pyramid").
- July 24:
  - Bindi Irwin, Australian television personality, conservationist, zookeeper and actress (voice of Bindi Bungee in the Curious George episode "Monkey Down Under", Isla Coralton in the Spidey and His Amazing Friends episode "Sonic Boom Boom").
  - Logan Grove, American actor (first voice of Gumball in The Amazing World of Gumball and Garfield Logan in Young Justice).
- July 31: Rico Rodriguez, American actor (voice of Raha in The Lion Guard, Luigi Vendetta in the Kick Buttowski: Suburban Daredevil episode "Luigi Vendetta", Snow-Foot in the Jake and the Never Land Pirates episode "The Legendary Snow-Foot!").

=== August ===
- August 1: Khamani Griffin, American actor (voice of Khalid in Sofia the First, Cal Devereaux in Cloudy with a Chance of Meatballs 2, Caleb in Rise of the Guardians).
- August 12: Lily Snowden-Fine, British former child actress and daughter of David Fine and Alison Snowden (voice of the title character in Peppa Pig, additional voices in Bob and Margaret).
- August 25: China Anne McClain, American actress and singer (voice of Tisha McStuffins in Doc McStuffins, Jenna Chive in VeggieTales in the House, Freddie Facilier in Descendants: Wicked World, Ghufaira in Bilal: A New Breed of Hero, Lyra in Sheep and Wolves, Uma in Descendants: The Royal Wedding).

=== October ===
- October 23: Amandla Stenberg, American actress (voice of Bia in Rio 2, Spider-Byte in Spider-Man: Across the Spider-Verse).
- October 28: Nolan Gould, American actor (voice of Little Jack in Doc McStuffins, Elliot in Sofia the First).

=== November ===
- November 4: Darcy Rose Byrnes, Irish-American actress and singer (voice of Amber in Sofia the First, Ikki in The Legend of Korra).
- November 23: Bradley Steven Perry, American actor (voice of Zevon in Descendants: Wicked World).

=== December ===
- December 2: Amber Frank, American actress (voice of Dee in Huevos: Little Rooster's Egg-cellent Adventure, Lucky Prescott in Spirit Riding Free).
- December 16: Kiara Muhammad, American actress (voice of the title character in the first two seasons of Doc McStuffins, Kari in Sofia the First).
- December 22: G. Hannelius, American actress and singer (voice of Little Bits in Wander Over Yonder, Amanda in the Fish Hooks episode "A Charity Fair to Remember", Lady Joy in the Sofia the First episode "Sofia the Second").

== Deaths ==
=== January ===
- January 4: Mae Questel, American actress (voice of Betty Boop and Olive Oyl), dies at age 89.
- January 7: Eli Bauer, American comics artist and animator (Terrytoons, Sesame Street), dies at age 69.
- January 21: Yoshifumi Kondō, Japanese animator (Studio Ghibli) and director (Whisper of the Heart), dies at age 47.
- January 28: Shotaro Ishinomori, Japanese manga artist (creator of Cyborg 009), dies at age 60.

=== February ===
- February 14: Thomas McKimson, American comics artist and animator (Walt Disney Company, Warner Bros. Cartoons), dies at age 90.
- February 21: Art Seidel, American production manager (assistant director for the live-action sequence in The Simpsons episode "Treehouse of Horror VI"), dies at age 66.
- February 23: Philip Abbott, American actor (voice of Nick Fury in Iron Man and Spider-Man), dies at age 73.
- February 24: Milicent Patrick, American actress, makeup artist, special effects designer and animator (Fantasia, Dumbo), dies at age 82.
- February 26: James Algar, American film director, screenwriter, and producer (The Walt Disney Company), dies at age 85.

=== April ===
- April 17: Linda McCartney, American photographer and activist (voiced herself in The Simpsons episode "Lisa the Vegetarian", Wilhelmina in Tropic Island Hum), dies from breast cancer at age 56.
- April 23: Enrique Riverón, Cuban-American cartoonist, animator and comics artist (Walt Disney Animation Studios), dies at age 95 or 96.

=== May ===
- May 14: Frank Sinatra, American singer and actor (voice of Singing Sword in Who Framed Roger Rabbit), dies from a heart attack at age 82.
- May 28: Phil Hartman, Canadian-American actor, comedian, screenwriter and graphic designer (voice of Professor Von Joy, Hans-Cuff and Staks in Challenge of the GoBots, Mr. Wilson, Henry Mitchell and Ruff in Dennis the Menace, Air Conditioner and Hanging Lamp in The Brave Little Toaster, Troy McClure and Lionel Hutz in The Simpsons, Psycho Bunny in Eek! The Cat, Calaboose Cal, Hot Dog Vendor and Inspector De Paws in Tom & Jerry Kids, Adolph Hitmaker, Tom Morgan in The Pagemaster, Russian Filmreel Announcer and Midget Clown in The Ren & Stimpy Show, Chauncey in Buster & Chauncey's Silent Night, Game Show Host in the Happily Ever After: Fairy Tales for Every Child episode "The Empress' Nightingale", Vaccu-Spook Auctioneer in The 13 Ghosts of Scooby-Doo episode "Reflections in a Ghoulish Eye", School Patrol Robots and Executive Vice President in The Jetsons episode "Boy George", Captain Frye in the DuckTales episode "Scrooge's Pet", Ace London in the TaleSpin episode "Mach One for the Gipper", Paddywhack in the Darkwing Duck episode "the Haunting of Mr. Banana Brain", Dimitri in the Captain Planet and the Planeteers episode "Mind Pollution", Inspector C. Bass in the Fish Police episode "A Fish Out of Water", Bernie Wasserman and Professor Blowhard in The Critic episode "Eyes on the Prize", Dan Anchorman in the Animaniacs episode "Broadcast Nuisance", Jiji in Kiki's Delivery Service, announcer for Cartoon Network), was murdered at age 49.
- May 31: Sherman Labby, American storyboard artist and production illustrator (Filmation, Hanna-Barbera, Marvel Productions), dies from muscular dystrophy at age 68.

=== June ===
- June 3: William L. Snyder, American film producer (Rembrandt Films), dies at age 80.
- June 5: Jeanette Nolan, American actress (voice of Ellie Mae in The Rescuers, Widow Tweed in The Fox and the Hound), dies from a stroke at age 86.
- June 12:
  - Retta Davidson, American animator (Walt Disney Animation Studios, Chuck Jones, Ralph Bakshi), dies at age 76.
  - Richard Thompson, American animator and film director (Warner Bros. Cartoons, MGM, Hanna-Barbera, DePatie-Freleng Enterprises, Bill Melendez), dies at age 83.
- June 24: Henry G. Saperstein, American film producer and distributor (UPA), dies at age 80.
- June 28: Jean-Yves Raimbaud, French animator and screenwriter (Space Goofs, Oggy and the Cockroaches), dies from lung cancer at age 40.

=== July ===
- July 6: Roy Rogers, American singer and actor (narrator of the Pecos Bill segment in Melody Time), dies at age 86.
- July 8: Dušan Vukotić, Yugoslav-Croatian cartoonist and animator (Zagreb Film, Ersatz), dies at age 71.
- July 16: Tony Sgroi, American comics artist and animator (worked for Warner Bros. animation, Bob Clampett, Walter Lantz, Hanna-Barbera), dies at age 73.
- July 17: Joseph Maher, Irish actor (voice of Emile Dorian in the Batman: The Animated Series episode "Tyger, Tyger"), dies at age 64.

=== August ===
- August 2: Shari Lewis, American ventriloquist, puppeteer, and actress (voice of Princess Nida in Arabian Knights, the title character and Cousin Maggie in Honey Halfwitch), dies at age 65.
- August 14: Stanislav Holý, Czech graphic artist, caricaturist, animation designer, children's book illustrator and animator (Mr. Pip), dies at age 55.
- August 25:
  - Lee Gunther, American film editor (co-founder of Marvel Productions), dies at age 63.
  - Marshall Barer, American lyricist, librettist, singer, songwriter and director (Mighty Mouse theme), dies at age 75.

=== September ===
- September 6: Whitney Lee Savage, American animator (Mickey Mouse in Vietnam, animated segments in Sesame Street), dies at age 69.
- September 25: Jeff Moss, American composer (Sesame Street), dies at age 56.

=== October ===
- October 3: Roddy McDowall, British-American actor (voice of Mad Hatter in the DC Animated Universe, Proteus in Gargoyles, the Breadmaster in The Tick, Snowball in Pinky and the Brain, Mr. Soil in A Bug's Life), dies from lung cancer at age 70.
- October 15: Jack Boyd, American animator and special effects creator (Walt Disney Company), dies at age 82.

=== November ===
- November 3: Bob Kane, American comic book writer, animator and artist (co-creator of Batman, Cool McCool, and Courageous Cat and Minute Mouse), dies at age 83.
- November 24: Jacques Eggermont, Belgian comics artist and animator (worked for CBA), dies at age 80.
- November 30: Ruth Clifford, American actress (fifth voice of Minnie Mouse and third voice of Daisy Duck) dies at age 98.

=== December ===
- December 10: Ray Goossens, Belgian animator (Musti, Plons de Kikker) and comics artist, dies at age 74.
- December 12: Don Patterson, American animator and film director and producer (Walt Disney Company, MGM, Walter Lantz, Hanna-Barbera), dies at age 88.
- December 19: Kazuo Harada, Japanese film director and producer (Studio Comet, Nihon Ad Systems, Tsuchida Production), dies at an unknown age.
- December 21: André LeBlanc, Haitian-American-Brazilian comics artist and animator (worked for Hanna-Barbera), dies at age 77.
- December 25: Richard Paul, American voice actor (voice of Sonny in Coonskin), dies at age 58.
- December 30: G. Stanley Jones, Canadian actor (voice of Lex Luthor in Challenge of the Superfriends, Riff Raff in Heathcliff), dies at age 72.

=== Specific date unknown ===
- Frank McSavage, Scottish-American comic artist and animator (Walt Disney Animation Studios, worked for Walter Lantz, Hanna-Barbera), dies at age 94 or 95.

== See also ==
- 1998 in anime
