= 1998 in Japanese television =

Events in 1998 in Japanese television.

== Channels ==
Launches:

- November 15 — Nickelodeon

== Debuts ==
Show	Station	Premiere Date	Genre	Original Run
Bomberman B-Daman Bakugaiden	TV Asahi	February 7th	tokusatsu	February 7, 1998 – January 31, 1999
Cardcaptor Sakura	NHK BS2	April 7th	anime	April 7, 1998 - March 21, 2000
Cowboy Bebop	TV Tokyo + WOWOW	April 3rd	anime	April 3, 1998 – June 26, 1998
Cyber Team in Akihabara	TBS	April 4th	anime	April 4, 1998 - September 26, 1998
Generator Gawl	TV Tokyo	October 6th	anime	October 6, 1998 - December 22, 1998
Great Teacher Onizuka	Fuji TV	July 7th	drama	July 7, 1998 – September 22, 1998
His and Her Circumstances	TV Tokyo	October 2nd	anime	October 2, 1998 – March 23, 1999
Initial D	Fuji TV	April 18th	anime	April 18, 1998 - December 5, 1998
Lost Universe	TV Tokyo	April 3rd	anime	April 3, 1998 – September 25, 1998
Master Keaton	Nippon TV	October 5th	anime	October 5, 1998 – March 29, 1999
Nonchan Noriben	CBC	June 1st	drama	June 1, 1998 – July 31, 1998
Ojarumaru	NHK	October 5th	anime	October 5, 1998 – present
Outlaw Star	TV Tokyo	January 8th	anime	January 8, 1998 – June 25, 1998
Seijuu Sentai Gingaman	TV Asahi	February 22nd	tokusatsu	February 22, 1998 – February 14, 1999
Serial Experiments Lain	TV Tokyo	July 6th	anime	July 6, 1998 – September 28, 1998
Shomuni	Fuji TV	April 15th	drama	April 15, 1998 – July 1, 1998
Silent Möbius	TV Tokyo	April 7th	anime	April 7, 1998 - September 29, 1998
Sorcerous Stabber Orphen	TBS	October 3rd	anime	October 3, 1998 – March 27, 1999
Space-Time Detective Genshi-kun	TV Tokyo	October 1st	anime	October 1, 1998 – June 24, 1999
Super Doll Licca-chan	TV Tokyo	October 6th	anime	October 6, 1998 - September 28, 1999
Super Milk Chan	Fuji TV	June 18th	anime	June 18, 1998 - September 24, 1998
Trigun	TV Tokyo	April 1st	anime	April 1, 1998 – September 30, 1998
Ultraman Gaia	MBS	September 5th	tokusatsu	September 5, 1998 – August 28, 1999
Weiß Kreuz	TV Tokyo	April 8th	anime	April 8, 1998 – September 30, 1998
Yu-Gi-Oh!	TV Asahi	April 4th	anime	April 4, 1998 - October 10, 1998

== Ongoing shows at the time ==
- Music Fair, music (1964-present)
- Mito Kōmon, jidaigeki (1969-2011)
- Sazae-san, anime (1969-present)
- FNS Music Festival, music (1974-present)
- Panel Quiz Attack 25, game show (1975-present)
- Doraemon, anime (1979-2005)
- Soreike! Anpanman, anime (1988-present)
- Downtown no Gaki no Tsukai ya Arahende!!, game show (1989-present)
- Crayon Shin-chan, anime (1992-present)
- Iron Chef, game show (1993-1999)
- Shima Shima Tora no Shimajirō, anime (1993-2008)
- Nintama Rantarō, anime (1993–present)
- Chibi Maruko-chan, anime (1995-present)
- Kochira Katsushika-ku Kameari Kōen-mae Hashutsujo, anime (1996-2004)
- Detective Conan, anime (1996-present)
- SASUKE, sports (1997-present)
- Doctor Slump, anime (1997-1999)

== Shows on Hiatus ==
Show	Station	Hiatus Date	Genre	Original Run
Cowboy Bebop	TV Tokyo + WOWOW	June 26th	anime	April 3, 1998 – June 26, 1998

== Returning shows ==
Show	Station	Returning Date	Genre	Original Run
Pocket Monsters (Pokémon)	TV Tokyo	April 16th	anime	April 16, 1998 - November 14, 2002
Cowboy Bebop	TV Tokyo + WOWOW	TBD	anime	April 3, 1998 - June 26, 1998

== Endings ==
Show	Station	Ending Date	Genre	Original Run
Azuki-chan	NHK	March 17th	anime	April 4, 1995 - March 17, 1998
Cutie Honey Flash	TV Asahi	January 31st	anime	February 15, 1997 – January 31, 1998
Chūka Ichiban!	Fuji TV	September 13th	anime	April 27, 1997 – September 13, 1998
Cyber Team in Akihabara	TBS	September 26th	anime	April 4, 1998 - September 26, 1998
Denji Sentai Megaranger	TV Asahi	February 15th	tokusatsu	February 14, 1997 – February 15, 1998
Fair, then Partly Piggy	TV Tokyo	September 29th	anime	July 3, 1997 – September 29, 1998
Flame of Recca	Fuji TV	July 10th	anime	July 19, 1997 – July 10, 1998
Hare Tokidoki Buta	TV Tokyo	September 29th	anime	July 3, 1997 – September 29, 1998
Initial D	Fuji TV	December 5th	anime	April 18, 1998 - December 5, 1998
The King of Braves GaoGaiGar	Nagoya TV	January 31	anime	February 1, 1997 – January 31, 1998
Kodomo no Omocha	TV Tokyo	March 27th	anime	April 5, 1996 - March 27, 1998
Nonchan Noriben	CBC	July 31st	drama	June 1, 1998 – July 31, 1998
Outlaw Star	TV Tokyo	June 25th	anime	January 8, 1998 – June 25, 1998
Rurouni Kenshin: Meiji Swordsman Romantic Story	Fuji TV	September 8th	anime	January 10, 1996 – September 8, 1998
Serial Experiments Lain	TV Tokyo	September 28th	anime	July 6, 1998 – September 28, 1998
Super Mashin Hero Wataru	TV Tokyo	September 24th	anime	October 2, 1997 – September 24, 1998
Super Milk Chan	Fuji TV	September 24th	anime	June 18, 1998 - September 24, 1998
Silent Möbius	TV Tokyo	September 29th	anime	April 7, 1998 - September 29, 1998
Trigun	TV Tokyo	September 30th	anime	April 1, 1998 – September 30, 1998
Ultraman Dyna	TV Asahi	August 29th	tokusatsu	September 6, 1997 – August 29, 1998
Weiß Kreuz	TV Tokyo	September 30th	anime	April 8, 1998 – September 30, 1998
Yu-Gi-Oh!	TV Asahi	October 10th	anime	April 4, 1998 - October 10, 1998

== See also ==
- 1998 in anime
- List of Japanese television dramas
- 1998 in Japan
- List of Japanese films of 1998
