= 4th Open Russian Festival of Animated Film =

The 4th Open Russian Festival of Animated Film was held in from Feb. 4-8 in 1999 at a boarding house called "Birch Grove" two kilometres from the town of Tarusa, Russia. Animated works from the past three years from the Russian Federation were accepted. Along with auteur films, commercial reels, video clips, music videos, television bumpers and one animated series were in competition. Coming the year after the 1998 Russian financial crisis, there were fewer films than usual.

The jury prizes were tailor-made to the films in competition. Also, any member or guest of the festival was able to vote for their favourite film.

== Jury ==
English	Profession(s)
Fyodor Khitruk	director, animator
Oksana Cherkasova	director
Andrey Khrzhanovskiy	director, animator
Igor Nazaruk	composer
Boris Pavlov	film theorist

== Jury prizes ==
Award	Film	Recipient(s) (the director of the film, unless stated otherwise)	Links
Grand Prix	At the Ends of the Earth; На краю земли (Na krayu zemli)	Konstantin Bronzit	
Best Animated Clip	The Beast; Чудовище (Chudovishche)	Antonov Aleksey	
Best Commercial	The Phone Bird; Телефонная птичка» (Telefonnaya ptichka)	Dmitry Vysotskiy; Andrey Sikorskiy (writer, artist)	
Prize for Talented Art Direction and Reflection of National Traditions	A Facetious Dance; Шуточный танец (Shutochnyy tanets)	Dinyara Ganiyeva (art director)	
Prize for Feature-length Exploration of a National Epic Poem with the Method of Puppet Animation	The Magic Pipe; Волшебная свирель (Volshebnaya svirel)	Mikhail Tumelya	
Prize for the Elegance of Artistic and Directorial Signature	Mimy; Мимы; Inkorstrakh; Инкорстрах; Deep Woods; Лесная глушь Barrisol; Баррисоль	Dmitriy Geller	
Prize for Scenario from the Series The Fund of Legal Reforms	The Need; Нужда (Nuzhda)	Vasiko Bedoshvilli	
Prize for Inventiveness and Lyricism	Father; Отец (Otets)	Aleksey Demin	
Best Debut Direction	Grand Jeter	Aleksandr Ilyash	
Prize for Witty Parody of Modern Commercials	Short Legs, Короткие ноги (Korotkiye nogi)	Svyatoslav Ushakov	

== Rating (by audience vote) ==
Each member of the audience was asked to list their top 5 five films of the festival. 5 points were given for a 1st place vote and so on, down to 1 point for a 5th place vote.

Position	Film	Director	Points	Link
1	At the Ends of the Earth; На краю земли (Na krayu zemli)	Konstantin Bronzit	442	
2	Once Upon a Time on the Sea-Shore; Однажды у синяго моря (Odnazhdy u sinyavo morya)	Aleksey Kharitidi	238	
3	The Magic Pipe; Волшебная свирель (Volshebnaya svirel)	Mikhail Tumelya	227	
4	Gone with the Wind; Унессённые ветром (Unessyonnyye vetrom)	Aleksandr Tatarskiy	146	
5	The Fund of Legal Reforms (series, 10x30sec); Фонд правовых реформ (Fond pravovykh reform)	Vasiko Bedoshvili; Yelena Rogova	109	
6	Beowulf; Беовульф	Yuriy Kulakov	92	
7	Father; Отец (Otets)	Aleksey Demin	67	
8	Night on Bald Mountain; Ночь на лысой горе (Noch na lysoy gore)	Galina Shakitskaya	62	
9	Short Legs, Короткие ноги (Korotkiye nogi)	Svyatoslav Ushakov	32	
