= Eat, Pray, Queef =

- South Park episode
- Episode no.: Season 13; Episode 4
- Directed by: Trey Parker
- Written by: Trey Parker
- Production code: 1304
- Original air date: April 1, 2009

Episode chronology
← Previous "Margaritaville"	Next → "Fishsticks"
- South Park season 13

"Eat, Pray, Queef" is the fourth episode of the thirteenth season of the American animated television series South Park. The 185th overall episode of the series, it originally aired on Comedy Central in the United States on April 1, 2009. In the episode, the men and boys of South Park became infuriated when the fart-joke oriented Terrance and Phillip show is replaced with the Queef Sisters, a show devoted to queef jokes. The women and girls of South Park accuse them of holding a sexist double standard when it comes to women queefing and men farting.

The episode was written and directed by series co-creator Trey Parker, and was rated TV-MA L in the United States. Parker and Matt Stone originally considered doing a full-length Queef Sisters episode in the style of the second season premiere "Terrance and Phillip in Not Without My Anus", but they decided against it based on the negative fan reaction to that episode. Instead, they used the same joke in-universe with the boys being in the place of fans eleven years ago.

The episode received generally positive reviews and, according to Nielsen Media Research, was seen by more than three million households in its original airing, making it the most-watched Comedy Central production of the week. The title is a reference to the Elizabeth Gilbert book Eat, Pray, Love; the episode also included references to Martha Stewart and the film The Road Warrior. The episode ends with the South Park men recording "Queef free", a charity song in the style of "We Are The World" mixed with lyrics from "I Am Woman". "Eat, Pray, Queef" was released on DVD and Blu-ray along with the rest of the thirteenth season on March 16, 2010.

== Plot ==
The boys of South Park Elementary School are anxiously awaiting the night's episode of Terrance and Phillip, which ended in a cliffhanger last season, while the girls at the school express disgust over the show and the boys' obsession with fart jokes. Cartman retaliates by farting in a little girl's face, which causes all the boys to laugh. After school, the boys gather in Cartman's house to watch the episode. To their horror, it is then revealed that, as an April Fools' Day joke, the channel is airing a new show called The Queef Sisters, about Canadian sisters Katherine and Katie Queef. They are very similar to Terrance and Phillip, but instead of fart jokes, they make queef jokes. The show ignites a queefing movement across the country, and men everywhere get upset and disgusted by the queefs, although the women do not understand what the problem is. Though the women of South Park argue that there is no difference between queefing and farting, the men are revolted by queefs, while still finding their own fart jokes amusing.

Meanwhile, Terrance and Phillip are furious their show got replaced with The Queef Sisters, sharing the American men's disgust of queef jokes. When the network president asks why they think fart jokes are funny but queef jokes are revolting, Terrance replies, "Because babies come from there!".

As a joke mirroring Cartman's, one of the girls at school queefs on Butters' face, causing him to run screaming and crying out of the school building. Randy talks with Butters' father Stephen on the phone and then comforts Stan. The other boys are shocked and their fathers, outraged, go to the Colorado General Assembly and demand a law banning queefing, greatly angering the town's women. Meanwhile, the Queefs appear on Regis and Kelly to promote their book Eat, Pray, Queef, and Terrance and Philip's show gets canceled due to the sisters' rising popularity. Terrance and Phillip attempt to kill the siblings, but the plan backfires when they end up becoming attracted to them after the ladies admit to idolizing the duo. They pair off into couples and travel the Canadian Wine Country together. Meanwhile, after Stan's mother Sharon queefs, she and Stan's sister, Shelley, start laughing at the dinner table, causing Stan and Randy to leave.

Pitying Butters, the South Park males testify in the case in the Colorado State Senate about the girl who queefed on Butters. A debate on the senate floor culminates with a female senator queefing almost exact lines of dialogue from The Road Warrior film. The next day, the newspapers announce that, partly due to the senator's stunt the previous day, the queefing ban has passed. As Stan and his father Randy celebrate, Sharon and Shelley are hurt and insulted by the decision, describing it as an example of sexism that still pervades society, and finally sarcastically congratulate the men for "getting their own way... again." Stan and Randy finally understand the issue was not simply about queefing, but a larger point about women's rights. The two get all the South Park men together and record an inspirational song called "Queef Free", declaring women should have the right to queef, while photographs of women working various careers are displayed on a television screen. Terrance and Philip, despite a continued disgust with the constant queefing, attempt to marry the two Queef Sisters. The vicar disgustedly leaves the ceremony as the couples repeatedly fart and queef on him, pronouncing them "Farts and Queefs" as he exits.

== Production ==
There are moments when you're doing a stupid TV show where it really strikes you how stupid your job is, and one is where we were doing the queefs, and they're jumping up and queefing in their face. It was like, "I have the dumbest job ever".

— Matt Stone,
South Park co-creator

"Eat, Pray, Queef" was written and directed by series co-founder Trey Parker. It first aired on April 1, 2009 in the United States on Comedy Central. Although Parker and fellow co-creator Matt Stone acknowledged it was a particularly juvenile episode, Parker said it was his favorite show of the season to produce. He said, "I seriously never laughed as hard doing retakes, just going shot-by-shot, sitting there in the editing room laughing". During the writing-process, the female producers and employees with the show found the script largely unfunny, disgusting, and offensive. They reportedly claimed vaginal flatulence would not bloom into a proud women's movement as it did in the episode, but Parker and Stone insisted that was what made the concept even funnier.

Originally, Parker and Stone considered making a full-length episode of The Queef Sisters. The duo had pulled a similar stunt with the second season premiere. Instead of the expected follow-up to "Cartman's Mom Is a Dirty Slut", in which the identity of Cartman's father was to be revealed, Parker and Matt Stone showed the episode "Terrance and Phillip in Not Without My Anus", a Terrance and Phillip-centered episode as an April Fools' Day prank. Since "Eat, Pray, Queef" was coincidentally also set to air on April Fools' Day, they considered a similar joke revolving around Katherine and Katie. However, since "Terrance and Phillip in Not Without My Anus" infuriated South Park fans at the time, they decided not to do it and wrote a full script for "Eat, Pray, Queef" instead. The original prank is referenced in the episode, when The Canada Channel announces that it will not air a much-anticipated part two episode of Terrance and Phillip, and instead will show the Queef Sisters as an April Fools' Day prank. The angry reaction from the boys mirrors the real-life fan reaction to the South Park second-season premiere.

The episode uses the characters' conflicting responses to the comedic value of farts and queefs to demonstrate a double standard between rights of men and women, even in the 21st century, as both genders hold unfair opinions towards each other, and the episode suggests men and women are, and should be, equals. Shortly after "Eat, Pray, Queef" was originally broadcast, the site also featured T-shirts and hooded sweatshirts based on the episode. One featured Katherine and Katie queefing and saying, "Babies come from there!".

== Cultural references ==
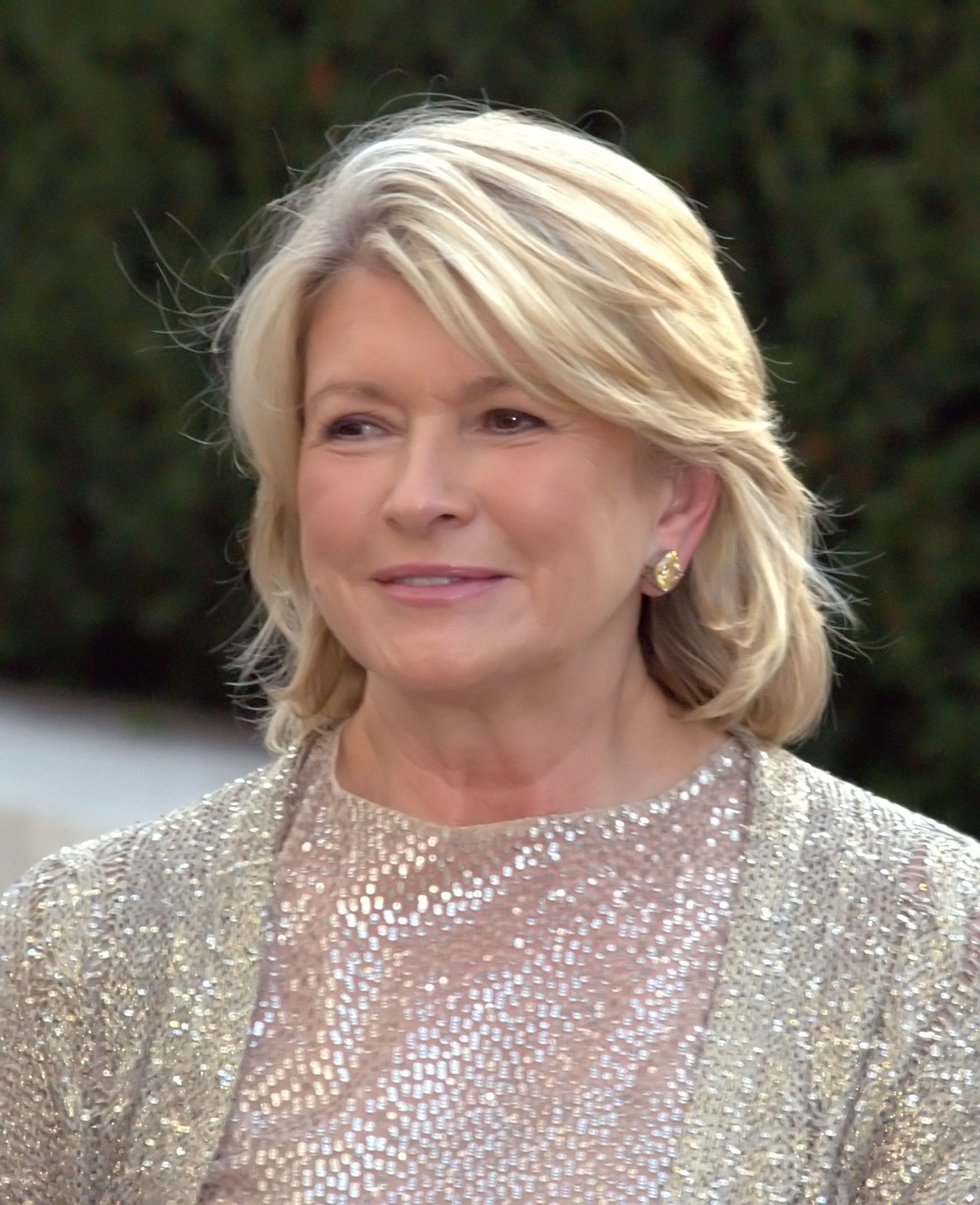
Martha Stewart and her television show, The Martha Stewart Show, are mocked in "Eat, Pray, Queef"

The book Eat, Pray, Queef by the Queef Sisters, which is also the source of the episode's title, is a satirical reference to the book Eat, Pray, Love written by Elizabeth Gilbert. There is a brief scene in which television host Martha Stewart provides instruction on ways to decorate queefs on The Martha Stewart Show. Television show hosts Regis Philbin and Kelly Ripa interview Katie and Katherine on their show, Live with Regis and Kelly. One of the queefs released by a woman in the episode includes exact dialogue from the 1981 action film The Road Warrior. The montage sequence where Terrance and Phillip take Katherine and Katie on a tour of Canadian wine country is a parody of a similar montage sequence in the 2004 comedy film Sideways. The men's anthem "Queef Free" is a parody of "We Are The World", the 1985 celebrities-for-charity song written by Michael Jackson and Lionel Richie.

Within the episode, The Canada Channel announces that, as an April Fools' Day prank, it will be airing the new Queef Sisters show instead of the much-anticipated part two episode of Terrance and Phillip. This is a reference to the South Park second-season premiere. Instead of the expected follow-up to "Cartman's Mom Is a Dirty Slut", in which the identity of Cartman's father was to be revealed, Parker and Matt Stone showed the episode "Terrance and Phillip in Not Without My Anus", a Terrance and Phillip-centered episode as an April Fools' Day prank. The move infuriated South Park fans.

== Reception ==
A preview clip of the episode listed on South Park Studios, the official South Park website, during the week before the episode's broadcast was viewed more than 50,000 times. In its original American broadcast, "Eat, Pray, Queef" was watched by three million households overall, according to the Nielsen Media Research, making it the most-watched Comedy Central production of the week. It had over one million more household viewers than the second most watched Comedy Central show that week, the April 1 episode of The Daily Show.

Niki Payne of the Philadelphia Examiner said "Eat, Pray, Queef" was "probably one of my all-time favorite episodes of South Park right now" because it was so on point concerning the double standards between men and women. She particularly praised the scene in which Stan and Randy are disgusted and uncomfortable when Stan's mom and sister started queefing at the dinner table. Carlos Delgado of If Magazine said the episode was "shocking, disgusting, and obscenely-funny" and demonstrated South Park's ability to tackle any type of issue "in a uniquely South Park manner". He particularly enjoyed the Martha Stewart segment, which he described as "just haunting". Josh Modell of The A.V. Club gave the episode a B-grade. Modell said the Katie and Katherine cartoon was particularly funny, but queefing was referred to in so many jokes that it became a bit tired by the end.

Some reviewers were less laudatory. Travis Fickett of IGN said the episode was "a textbook example of a disappointing South Park". He said the jokes were predictable, lazy, boring, and that Terrance and Phillip are not funny enough to carry large portions of an episode.

== Home media ==
"Eat, Pray, Queef", along with the thirteen other episodes from South Park's thirteenth season, were released on a three-disc DVD set and two-disc Blu-ray set in the United States on March 16, 2010. The sets included brief audio commentaries by Parker and Stone for each episode, a collection of deleted scenes, and a special mini-feature Inside Xbox: A Behind-the-Scenes Tour of South Park Studios, which discussed the process behind animating the show with Inside Xbox host Major Nelson.
