= Ike's Wee Wee =

- South Park episode
- Episode no.: Season 2 Episode 3
- Directed by: Trey Parker
- Written by: Trey Parker
- Editing by: John M. Watson; Giancarlo Ganziano
- Production code: 204
- Original air date: May 20, 1998

Episode chronology
← Previous "Cartman's Mom Is Still a Dirty Slut"	Next → "Chickenlover"
- South Park season 2

"Ike's Wee Wee" is the third episode of the second season of the American animated television series South Park. The 16th episode of the series overall, it first aired on Comedy Central in the United States on May 20, 1998. In the episode, school counselor Mr. Mackey is fired, and turns to drugs. Meanwhile, the boys misconstrue what circumcision entails, and try to save Kyle's younger brother Ike from his upcoming bris.

The episode was written and directed by series co-creator Trey Parker. "Ike's Wee Wee" satirizes certain attitudes towards drug users, and explores whether family can only mean those who are related by blood. This episode introduced Ike's backstory as an adopted Canadian child. "Ike's Wee Wee" received positive responses from critics, who especially praised the episode for its touching moments.

== Plot ==
Mr. Mackey, the school counselor, is giving a drug and alcohol prevention lecture to the class, emphasizing that smoking, drinking, marijuana and LSD are bad. He passes a sample of marijuana around the class so that the children can learn its smell, but it is never returned (it's later revealed that Mr. Garrison stole it, as he is seen watching Teletubbies while high). As a result, Mr. Mackey is fired and later kicked out of his house, leaving him homeless. A desperate Mackey gives in to trying marijuana one night in an alley, and later LSD. Soon enough, Mr. Mackey becomes a drug-addled hippie and meets a female hippie, with whom he decides to get married. While on honeymoon in India, Mr. Mackey is captured and taken into rehab. Mr. Mackey emerges clean from rehab and is given his job back.

Meanwhile, Kyle invites Stan, Cartman and Kenny to his younger brother Ike's bris. When they learn more about what a bris is, and misconstrue it as a party where they are going to cut off his penis, Kyle tries to find a way to hide his brother from his parents and the circumcision process. Kyle puts Ike on a train to Lincoln, Nebraska and makes an Ike-style doll out of meat bones in an attempt to not arouse his parents' suspicions. This backfires when the doll is mauled by a rabid dog that subsequently gets run over by a truck, which leads Kyle's parents to think that Ike is dead. At the funeral, Kyle finds out that Ike is not his biological brother, but was adopted from Canada due to the tombstone featuring the Canadian flag. Upon discovering this, Kyle declares that Ike is no longer his brother and reveals the truth to his shocked parents, who retrieve Ike from Nebraska. Kyle is so upset, that when Kenny falls into a gravesite and is crushed by a gravestone, Kyle flatly says his line "you bastards".

The day of the bris arrives, and Kyle is grounded for treating Ike as he is no longer his brother. Ike initially tries to regain Kyle's affection by bringing an album of family photos to him, showing Kyle pictures of them together when Kyle was a toddler and Ike was a baby. Kyle initially disdains this action, scornfully calling Ike "Canadian", which prompts Stan to suggest that perhaps Kyle is being too hard on Ike. Kyle responds by saying there was no real connection between himself and Ike, and that their relationship was "all a big lie". Ike continues to show Kyle pictures of their younger selves, engaging in activities like throwing a football and Kyle helping bathe Ike. When Kyle tells Ike to "beat it", Ike then puts on one of Kyle's hats to show Kyle just how much he idolizes him.

Later, when the mohel arrives to perform the bris, Ike flees to Kyle's room in terror. The mohel then knocks on the door of Kyle's room and gently tries to convince Ike to come out; in response, Ike jumps into Kyle's arms and embraces him. This prompts a change of heart in Kyle; when the adults enter Kyle's room to take Ike back downstairs for the ceremony, Kyle defends Ike fiercely, calling him "my little brother" once more. When the mohel tells Kyle that not only have his own father and grandfather had a bris performed on them, but Kyle himself had one as well, Kyle is initially shocked; however, when the mohel explains to him what a circumcision actually is (telling him "we're just gonna snip it, so that it looks bigger"), all the boys in the room realize their misunderstanding, with even Cartman saying he wants to be circumcised too. As the ceremony commences, Kyle reassures Ike that he is there for him; even though the boys pass out momentarily, Ike goes over to Kyle only seconds after the bris is performed, and Kyle is relieved to see that he is unharmed. Furthermore, Kyle states that he now realizes that family isn't necessarily just people who are related to him by blood, but the people who he truly cares about, adding that he considers his friends to be family too...except for Cartman (with Stan agreeing and replying "naturally"), which prompts Cartman to angrily retort that he doesn't want to be part of Kyle's "penis chopping family" anyway.

== Production ==
"That actually happened to me. In the seventh grade I had a counselor who came into class and passed around a little piece of marijuana. He lit it so everyone could see how it smelled like, and then it disappeared. And he was like, 'Where is it now? Who has it now? Can you please pass it back to the front.' But it was like, gone. So I just wrote down that experience, which became that scene."

— Trey Parker

"Ike's Wee Wee" was written and directed by series co-creator Trey Parker. The scene where Mr. Mackey loses the marijuana cigarette in class was inspired by a real event from Parker's life, where a counselor came into his class in seventh grade, and passed around a lit piece of marijuana, which then disappeared. At the beginning and end of the episode, there are scenes where the kids imitate Mr. Mackey's voice to him, while he is oblivious to the fact that he is being made fun of. Parker and his classmates used to do the same thing to their counselor in junior high school, who was the basis for Mr. Mackey's character. Parker said that he was especially proud of Chef's line, "There's a time and a place for everything, and it's called college", which is something Parker believes in, noting that if he had a child, he would tell him: "Do whatever you want, just wait till college because you don't know what the fuck's up right now." Chef's sentence would later return in the season four episode "The Tooth Fairy Tats 2000".

The episode introduced Ike's backstory as a Canadian child adopted by the Broflovskis. Ever since the recurring characters Terrance and Phillip were established to be Canadians in the season one finale "Cartman's Mom Is a Dirty Slut", and the subsequent season two premiere "Terrance and Phillip in Not Without My Anus", all Canadian characters on South Park have shared the same simplistic design: having simple beady eyes and a floppy head made up of two halves. While Ike had been on the show since its first episode, the writers originally did not know that he was going to be Canadian; he was retroactively made one based on his visual similarity to Terrance and Phillip. Ike's backstory would play an important role in the film South Park: Bigger, Longer & Uncut, which involves a fictional American–Canadian war, as well as in future episodes of the series, such as the season seven episode, "It's Christmas in Canada", in which Ike's biological parents take him away from the Broflovskis and bring him back to Canada.

"Ike's Wee Wee" features regular voice acting from series creators Parker and Matt Stone for most characters, Mary Kay Bergman (credited as Shannen Cassidy) for female characters, and Isaac Hayes for Chef. Additional dialogue was provided by South Park audio engineer Bruce Howell, while Ike's lines were uttered by Howell's then-five-year-old son Jesse.

== Themes ==
"Ike's Wee Wee" raises the question of who really can be considered one's family. At first, Kyle's implicit idea is that family consists of "those for whom we care that are related by blood". Based on this viewing of family, he no longer feels the need to help Ike when he learns that they are not related by blood. As the story progresses, Kyle questions his initial beliefs, and forms the episode's central moral by saying that "Family isn't about whose blood you have. It's about who you care about." Thus, Kyle's reformed view of family not only includes his adopted brother, but his friends as well. Kyle's questioning of his own morals has been likened to engaging in the dialectical Socratic method of inquiry.

The subplot of "Ike's Wee Wee" satirizes certain drug subcultures, as well as drug use, and societal attitudes towards drug users. The way the episode portrays Mr. Mackey's lack of real knowledge about drug use and addiction has been described as an example of South Park satirizing left-wing politics, when "they lead to the sort of hypocrisy inconsistent with a proper open society".

== Cultural references ==
Part of the episode revolves around the practice of religious male circumcision in Judaism, and the related ceremony called the brit milah or bris, and the boys' misunderstanding of the tradition. The boys believe that circumcision entails the cutting off of one's penis, which they refer to by the childish colloquial term "wee wee", except for Cartman, who insists on calling it "fireman". Cannabis is also referred to by various names, including weed, grass, pot, and marijuana, in which Mr. Mackey constantly pronounces the letter j as /dʒ/ (as in jam), which makes Kyle mispronounce the drug as "marry-Jew wanna".

Drug use is often portrayed in conjunction with the hippie subculture, through hippie characters, such as the two teenagers that give LSD to Mackey, and the woman that he befriends and eventually marries. Jimbo and Cartman both use the term hippie pejoratively. During their argument, Jimbo tells Mackey that he should just go to a Grateful Dead concert, to which Mackey says he can't since Jerry Garcia is deceased. On two occasions, the episode shows people watching Teletubbies while high on marijuana or in rehab. In his drug prevention speech, Mackey claims that LSD was made famous by John Lennon and Paul McCartney, former members of The Beatles. Both Lennon and McCartney are known to have experimented with the drug.

While walking home, Mr. Mackey drunkenly sings the 1983 Pat Benatar song "Love Is a Battlefield". During Ike's supposed funeral, a bagpipe player starts playing the Hebrew folk song "Hava Nagila". At the funerals, the priest uses the phrase "Ashes to ashes, dust to dust", from the Anglican burial service. When the townspeople start to harass Mackey, one of them shouts, "Now we see what you and Homer Simpson have in common... Dope!". This references the famous catchphrase from The Simpsons, "D'oh!", which sounds similar to the word dope, meaning illicit drugs. At Kyle's house, Kyle's parents offer the boys a dish called "GaHekgafuga", which is not a real dish. When Mackey is in India, he is captured by members of The A-Team, and driven away in their van. Mackey is taken to rehabilitation to the Betty Ford Clinic, which is based on a real-life hospital.

A common plot device is referenced, where a shoulder angel (represents conscience) and a shoulder devil (representing temptation) appear near a character. This concept is spoofed in the episode, as both the devil and the angel suggest to Mackey that he should drink the beer. When Stan tells Kyle what he thinks a bris means, a dolly zoom is used, which is an unsettling filmmaking effect often used to show that a character is undergoing a major realization. The hallucinogenic effects of certain drugs are portrayed by different means. When inhaling cannabis, the alley that Mr. Mackey is in suddenly turns very colorful. After taking LSD, Mackey's head inflates like a giant balloon, and then literally detaches from his body, and floats away (the boys interact with Mackey by looking up at his head as it floats over them).

In the scene where the boys are talking to Chef, he leaves without answering the boys' sexual question, angrily saying, "Dammit, children, why do I always have to be the one to explain all this stuff to you. Ask your parents for once!". This is in reference to Chef's tendency to give advice to the boys. While the children are trying to think of what is the most important thing for a man, Cartman says "Ham?", to which Kyle angrily replies, "No, not ham, you fat fuck!". This exchange was used verbatim between Stan and Cartman in The Spirit of Christmas, the 1995 short film that was the precursor to South Park.

== Broadcast, reception, and impact ==
Two episodes preceded "Ike's Wee Wee" in the second season of the show. The episode scheduled for April 1, 1998, promised to resolve the cliffhanger ending of the first season finale, "Cartman's Mom Is a Dirty Slut", regarding the identity of Cartman's father, but was in fact an April Fools' Day joke on the creators' part: "Terrance and Phillip in Not Without My Anus", an entire episode revolving around the two title characters. The April 1 episode was supposed to be a one-off, with the rest of the season starting in May. However, following overwhelmingly negative fan reaction, the episode resolving the Cartman's father storyline, "Cartman's Mom Is Still a Dirty Slut", was moved from its planned May 20 air date to April 22. "Ike's Wee Wee" then started a six-episode run of the season when it was broadcast on Comedy Central in the United States on May 20, 1998.

"[...] 'Ike's Wee-Wee' was subtle and low-key – proof that deep in its mischievous little heart 'South Park' is a show with sweet, kind moments sandwiched between scatological humor that also has a point."

— Allan Johnson, Chicago Tribune

"Ike's Wee Wee" was met with favorable reviews. Critics especially praised the episode for its touching moments, in contrast with the off-color humor often employed in the series. In his review of the episode in the Chicago Tribune, Allan Johnson praised the episode, especially in comparison with the first two episodes of the season, considering it to be one of the better episodes of the series. When the series reached its 100th episode in 2003, the same writer also listed "Ike's Wee Wee" as one of the "top 10 episodes that have made [South Park] one of the most provocative comedies on TV". A review in the Pittsburgh Post-Gazette said that "[i]n the midst of all this potty-mouthed humor, there are moments that are downright touching", and particularly highlighted the ending of "Ike's Wee Wee" as an example, explaining that "all's well in the end, and Kyle and the boys learn a lesson about family values that even Dan Quayle would approve of". In 2000, visitors of the Comedy Central website chose "Ike's Wee Wee" as their favorite episode during a voting called "South Park e-Lections", held around the time of the United States presidential election that year.

Mr. Mackey's line, "drugs are bad, m'kay?", has entered popular culture. The Eminem song, "The Kids" (which is featured on the B-side of the single "The Way I Am" and the clean version of The Marshall Mathers LP), is thematically about drug use, and makes numerous references to South Park and impressions of the show's characters, including an impression of Mr. Mackey's voice and the repetition of his line. The song "Hip Hop Quotables" by Ludacris, from his album Chicken-n-Beer, also contains the line. In 2008, the line was referenced in the dissenting opinion of a judge, in a case of the United States Court of Appeals for the Federal Circuit. Also, in a 2010 marijuana-related court case at the Maryland Court of Appeals, Judge Clayton Greene, Jr. referenced the episode in his dissenting opinion, calling Mr. Mackey's words "immortal". In 2011, during a judiciary committee hearing about a marijuana-related bill in Denver, Colorado, a representative showed off a potential packaging for edible marijuana products. According to a group called the Cannabis Therapy Institute, the label on the package, which bore the placeholder text, "Legal and governmentally approved statement describing that pot is bad, M-ok", was a reference to the South Park episode.

== Home media ==
"Ike's Wee Wee" was released on VHS in April 1999, along with the episode "Chickenlover", on a video titled South Park: Volume 8. The episode saw its first DVD release in December 1999, on a disc called South Park: Volume 4, which also included "Chickenlover", as well as "Cartman's Mom Is a Dirty Slut" and "Cartman's Mom Is Still a Dirty Slut". South Park: The Complete Second Season was released on DVD on June 3, 2003. On these home releases, "Ike's Wee Wee" has a humorous introduction by series co-creators Trey Parker and Matt Stone, who are playing music to the elderly in a retirement home. Episodes of season two have also been released digitally, on services such as Amazon Video, the iTunes Store, and Xbox Live Marketplace. Like most episodes of South Park, "Ike's Wee Wee" is available to watch for free on the show's website, SouthParkStudios.com.
