= Cartman's Mom Is Still a Dirty Slut =

- South Park episode
- Episode no.: Season 2 Episode 2
- Directed by: Trey Parker
- Written by: David Goodman; Trey Parker
- Production code: 202
- Original air date: April 22, 1998

Episode chronology
← Previous "Terrance and Phillip in Not Without My Anus"	Next → "Ike's Wee Wee"
- South Park season 2

"Cartman's Mom Is Still a Dirty Slut" is the second episode of the second season of the American animated television series South Park. The 15th episode of the series overall, it premiered on Comedy Central in the United States on April 22, 1998. The episode concludes the storyline of the season one finale "Cartman's Mom Is a Dirty Slut"; Dr. Alphonse Mephesto is suddenly shot, just as he is about to reveal the identity of Eric Cartman's father. The four boys and Chef rush him to Hell's Pass Hospital while the town of South Park experiences a massive blizzard.

The episode aired after the season premiere, "Terrance and Phillip in Not Without My Anus" was aired in its place three weeks earlier as an April Fools' Day prank. Upset viewers wrote over 2,000 complaints to Comedy Central within a week of its premiere date. In 2013, fans voted "Cartman's Mom Is Still a Dirty Slut" as the best episode of season two.

== Plot ==
Just as Mephesto is about to announce who Eric Cartman's father is, the electricity goes out, the room is darkened, and two gunshots are fired. As the lights come back on, everyone discovers that Mephesto has been shot. Chef notes that he is still alive and, along with the boys, rushes him to the hospital. Upon entering the hospital, they meet Dr. Doctor, and a nurse with no arms named Nurse Goodley; they are the only ones working in the hospital. He manages to get Mephesto on a life support system, but has many other patients to tend to. Outside, a terrible blizzard brews.

While the rest of the adults in town and a visiting television crew film a reenactment of Mephesto's shooting for America's Most Wanted, a tree falls on the power line causing the power to go out. All of the adults are now stuck in a building until the storm settles. After only a few hours of being trapped, the group hastily resort to cannibalism to survive, eating Eric Roberts and, in the following scenes, the America's Most Wanted film crew. The power also goes out back at the hospital, and a plan is enacted to restore it. Dr. Doctor suggests that they split into two teams: team A, consisting of everyone in the room except Kenny, and team B, consisting of Kenny. His job is to reconnect the generator in the cold, while team A give advice to him via walkie-talkie as they enjoy some hot cocoa and TV.

Once Kenny gets to the generator, he discovers that there is no wire connecting the cords, so he decides to make the connection himself to restore the electricity, fatally electrocuting himself in the process. Thanks to his brave deed, the power is restored and Mephesto survives. After casually revealing his shooter was his brother (who tries to kill him every month), he gathers everyone in the emergency room for the revelation of Cartman's father: his mother Liane. Mephesto explains that Liane is a hermaphrodite, someone with both male and female genitalia. He also reveals that hermaphrodites cannot have children, so Liane must have impregnated another woman on her sex spree. An angered Cartman then demands to know who his mother is, but when a narrator questions who his mother might be, he quickly refuses to pursue the issue any further.

== Production ==
In the season fourteen episode "201", Jack Tenorman (left) is revealed to be the true father of Cartman, and Scott Tenorman (right) is revealed to be Cartman's half-brother.

Written by series co-creator Trey Parker and David Goodman, and directed by Parker, "Cartman's Mom Is Still a Dirty Slut" originally aired on Comedy Central in the United States on April 22, 1998. This episode was originally to air on April 1, 1998, four weeks after "Cartman's Mom Is a Dirty Slut" was first broadcast, but instead of continuing the storyline from "Cartman's Mom is a Dirty Slut", Parker and co-creator Matt Stone made an episode regarding the South Park minor characters Terrance and Philip, called "Terrance and Phillip in Not Without My Anus", as an April Fools' Day prank on viewers of the show. Upset fans wrote more than 2,000 angry e-mail complaints to Comedy Central within a week of the episode's original broadcast, and media outlets said some fans harbored a grudge against the show more than five years after the episode was broadcast.

The outcome of "Cartman's Mom is Still a Dirty Slut" was revisited in the season fourteen episode, "200", where it is revealed that Liane is not a hermaphrodite and is not Cartman's father after all, as revealed by Cartman's hand puppet persona, Mitch Conner. In the following episode, "201", it is revealed that Cartman's actual father is Jack Tenorman, the father of his personal rival Scott Tenorman.

== Home media ==
On April 27, 1999, "Cartman's Mom Is Still a Dirty Slut" was released on the "South Park: Volume 7" VHS tape, which also contained "Cartman's Mom is a Dirty Slut", in a third series of South Park home video releases. Volume 7 was sold along with Volume 8, which contained "Chickenlover" and "Ike's Wee Wee", and Volume 9, which contained "Conjoined Fetus Lady" and "The Mexican Staring Frog of Southern Sri Lanka". All 18 episodes of the second season, including "Cartman's Mom Is Still a Dirty Slut", were released on a DVD box set on June 3, 2003.
