= Cartman's Mom Is a Dirty Slut =

- South Park episode
- Episode no.: Season 1 Episode 13
- Directed by: Trey Parker
- Written by: Trey Parker; David R. Goodman
- Production code: 113
- Original air date: February 25, 1998

Guest appearance
- Jay Leno as Kitty

Episode chronology
| ← Previous "Mecha-Streisand" | Next → "Terrance and Phillip in Not Without My Anus" |
- South Park season 1

"Cartman's Mom Is a Dirty Slut" is the thirteenth and final episode of the first season of the American animated television series South Park. It originally aired on Comedy Central in the United States on February 25, 1998. The episode is the highest viewed episode in the entire South Park series, with 6.4 million views. It is part one of a two-episode story arc, which concluded with "Cartman's Mom Is Still a Dirty Slut". The episode follows Eric Cartman, one of the show's main characters, becoming curious about the identity of his father. He discovers that his father is most likely a man his mother had sexual intercourse with during an annual party called "The Drunken Barn Dance". Meanwhile, his friends Stan, Kyle and Kenny participate on America's Stupidest Home Videos, after filming Cartman having a tea party with his stuffed animals in his backyard.

The episode was written by Trey Parker and staff writer David R. Goodman, and directed by Parker. It featured a guest appearance by comedian Jay Leno, who provided cat sounds for Cartman's cat. "Cartman's Mom is a Dirty Slut" had a cliffhanger ending; the identity of Cartman's father was intended to be revealed in the second season premiere, but Parker and co-creator Matt Stone wrote an unrelated April Fools' Day episode instead. This was much to the dismay of South Park viewers. This episode was met with positive responses from critics.

In the summer of 2013, fans voted "Cartman's Mom Is a Dirty Slut" as the best episode of season one.

== Plot ==
Stan, Kyle and Kenny decide to check on Cartman when he does not show up for school. They discover that he is having a tea party with his stuffed animals in his backyard. Their school counselor Mr. Mackey advises them to videotape Cartman, so he can study him psychologically.

Meanwhile, Cartman does not have a father to celebrate father-and-son day and asks his mother who he is. His mother explains that she met his father, a Native American named Chief Running Water, at the 12th annual "Drunken Barn Dance". However, Chief Running Water informs him that his mother is a slut and that he saw her with Chef later that night at the dance. Chef tells Cartman that his mother preferred Mr. Garrison over him. At a bar, Mr. Garrison concedes to Cartman that he may have had sex with her, but then argues "But who here didn't!?", to which Mayor McDaniels, Principal Victoria, Jesus and Father Maxi share guilty glances with each other. Dr. Mephesto is willing to perform DNA testing to resolve the issue, but requires $3,000 for the test. Cartman gets depressed, as he does not have the money.

In the meantime, Kyle, Stan, and Kenny watch America's Stupidest Home Videos; they hear there's a $10,000 grand prize for the stupidest home video. They decide to enter the competition with the video they made of Cartman. Cartman approaches Kyle and Stan (Kenny was dragged to a train track by Stan's go-cart and killed by an oncoming train) with the depressing news about his lack of funds to find out his real father. Stan and Kyle agree that if they win the video contest, they will give Cartman the $3,000 needed for the DNA testing. Cartman is overjoyed, but quickly becomes extremely furious after seeing the aired video. Though they do not win the competition, as Stan's grandfather wins with a videotape he made of Kenny's death, they receive a $3,000 runner-up prize instead, which is still enough for the DNA test. Dr. Mephesto calls together Cartman, his mother and all potential fathers (including the entire 1989 Denver Broncos), when he gets the test results which is where Kenny comes back to life. When he is about to reveal the identity of Cartman's father, a narrator states that the answer will be revealed in the new South Park episode four weeks later, much to Cartman's annoyance and anger.

== Production ==
"Cartman's Mom is a Dirty Slut" was written by South Park co-creator Trey Parker and staff writer David R. Goodman, and directed by Parker. South Park would sometimes have guest appearances by celebrities, but they would usually voice a supporting or minor character; Academy Award winning actor George Clooney had previously provided dog barks for the episode "Big Gay Al's Big Gay Boat Ride". Comedian and talk-show host Jay Leno provided the sounds of Cartman's cat Mr. Kitty in the episode. Leno would return later as himself in the season two episode "City on the Edge of Forever". Toddy Walters provided the vocals for the song used at "The Drunken Barn Dance" (which is a parody of "My Heart Will Go On"). Walters was romantically involved with Parker at the time the episode was being produced. She would continue to write and sing for the show throughout its third season.

The episode was to conclude with the first episode of the second season, on April 1, 1998, four weeks after "Cartman's Mom is a Dirty Slut" was first broadcast. However, instead of continuing the episode's storyline, Parker and co-creator Matt Stone made an episode regarding the South Park minor characters Terrance and Philip, as an April Fool's Day prank on viewers of the show. Upset fans wrote more than 2,000 angry e-mail complaints to Comedy Central within a week of the episode's original broadcast, and media outlets said some fans harbored a grudge against the show more than five years after the episode was broadcast.

== Theme ==
Writing for Newsday, television critic Tom Carson stated he felt the episode was "a really plaintive story about craving something, anything, to hold onto", as Cartman tries to adapt the culture of each man he believes to be his father.

== Release and reception ==
The episode was first aired in the United States on the cable television channel Comedy Central on February 25, 1998. It received a Nielsen rating in the 8.0 range. In Canada, the episode premiered on The Comedy Channel on August 20, 1998, it was the last of a three-week South Park marathon aired by the network. A little over 300,000 viewers watched the episode, which was a record for the channel, which had only been part of Canada's cable networks for ten months. The complete three-week marathon was watched by an average 186,307 viewers per minute per day.

When first broadcast in the United States, "Cartman's Mom is a Dirty Slut" gained positive responses from critics. Writing for The Vancouver Sun, Brian Lowry and Alex Strachan defined "Cartman's Mom is a Dirty Slut", as well as "Damien", "Mecha Streisand" and "Mr. Hankey, the Christmas Poo", as season one's "classic episodes", commenting that "Cartman's Mom is a Dirty Slut" was "a heart-warming, tender episode". Carson also praised the episode for its "hilarious sex-jokes". In a top ten list of South Park's best episodes, compiled by Chicago Tribune reporter Allan Johnson, "Cartman's Mom is a Dirty Slut" was ranked third, behind "Osama bin Laden Has Farty Pants" and "Mr. Hankey, the Christmas Poo".

On April 27, 1999, "Cartman's Mom is a Dirty Slut" was released on the "South Park: Volume 7" VHS tape which also contained "Cartman's Mom is Still a Dirty Slut", in a third series of South Park home video releases. Volume 7 was sold along with Volume 8, which contained "Chickenlover" and "Ike's Wee Wee", and Volume 9, which contained "Conjoined Fetus Lady" and "The Mexican Staring Frog of Southern Sri Lanka". All thirteen episodes of the first season, including "Cartman's Mom is a Dirty Slut", were released on a DVD box set on November 12, 2002. Parker and Stone recorded commentary tracks for each episode, but the tracks were not included on the DVDs due to "standards" issues with some of the statements; refusing to allow the tracks to be censored or edited, Parker and Stone's commentary tracks were released on a separate CD.
