= Kinryū Arimoto =

Japanese voice actor (1940–2019)

- 有本 欽隆
- Born: Yoshitaka Arimoto; February 11, 1940; Tottori Prefecture, Japan
- Died: February 1, 2019 (aged 78); Tokyo, Japan
- Occupations: Actor; voice actor
- Years active: 1963–2018
- Notable credits: One Piece as Whitebeard; Gundam Seed as Patrick Zala; Psycho-Pass as Tomomi Masaoka

Kinryū Arimoto (有本 欽隆, Arimoto Kinryū; born Yoshitaka Arimoto, February 11, 1940 – February 1, 2019) was a Japanese actor and voice actor formerly employed by Production Baobab. He also practiced kenpo, earning the black belt rank of shodan. Though his birth name was Yoshitaka, a kanji mistranslation led to his name being read as Kinryū, which stuck as his stage name.

He died on February 1, 2019, aged 78 due to esophageal cancer.

== Co-Artists with Kinryū Arimoto ==
- From 1996 to 2001, Arimoto trained voice actors such as Sakiko Tamagawa, Akiko Hiramatsu, Etsuko Kozakura, Rica Matsumoto, Bin Shimada, Tomokazu Seki, Tange Sakura, Mayumi Iizuka.
- From 2002 to 2004, Arimoto trained voice actors such as Sōichirō Hoshi, Rei Tanaka, Naomi Shindō, Kotono Mitsuishi, Takehito Koyasu, Hōko Kuwashima, Megumi Toyoguchi, Tetsu Shiratori, Yasuhiro Takato, Isshin Chiba, Katsumi Toriumi, Toshiko Nakajima, Kenichi Suzumura, Maaya Sakamoto, Fumiko Orikasa, Makiko Omoto, and Akira Ishida.
- In 2011, Arimoto trained voice actors such as Asami Seto, Mamoru Miyano, Yoshimasa Hosoya, Megumi Hayashibara, Aya Hisakawa, Chiaki Anzai, and Kenji Hamada.

== Filmography ==
=== Television animation ===
1960

- Osomatsu-kun (1966) (bank employee)
- Perman (1967)
- Kaibutsu-kun (1968)

1970s

- Gatchaman Fighter (1979)

1980s

- City Hunter (1987) (Chief Nogami)

1990s

- Oniisama e... (1991) (Professor Misonoo)
- Tekkaman Blade (1992) (Bogard)
- Jeanie with the Light Brown Hair (anime) (1992) (Freddie)
- My Patrasche (1992) (Captain)
- Ocean Waves (1993) (Rikako Muto's Father)
- Mobile Suit Victory Gundam (1993) (Tengrashi Loos, Vistan)
- Shippū! Iron Leaguer (1993) (Richard Ginjo)
- Miracle Girls (1993) (Principal)
- Mobile Fighter G Gundam (1994) (Club Ace, Dr. Raizo Kasshu)
- Haō Taikei Ryū Knight (1994)
- Yamato Takeru (1994)
- Saint Tail (1995)
- Mobile Suit Gundam Wing (1995) (Marquis Weridge, Master Winner, Townsend)
- Virtua Fighter (1995) (Bruce Bryant)
- Romeo's Blue Skies (1995) (Casera)
- Ganba! Fly High (1996)
- Kiko-chan's Smile (1996)
- You're Under Arrest! (1996) (FOX Osho)
- In the Beginning: The Bible Stories (1997) (Adam)
- Gasaraki (1998) (elder, Yoshitake Gowa)
- DT Eightron (1998) (Cluster)
- Trigun (1998) (chairman)
- Bubblegum Crisis Tokyo 2040 (1998) (Dr. Steven K. Stingray)
- Spriggan (1998) (Yamamoto)
- Sensual Phrase (1999)
- I'm Gonna Be An Angel! (1999) (Milk Boy)
- Bubu Chacha (1999) (Boo-man, Narrator)

2000s

- Gate Keepers (2000) (AEGIS commander)
- Hidamari no Ki (2000) (Ogata Kōan)
- One Piece (2002) (Whitebeard)
- Gundam Seed (2002) (Patrick Zala)
- Last Exile (2003) (Nestor)
- Fullmetal Alchemist (2003) (Priest Cornello)
- My-HiME (2004) (Joseph Glear)
- Elfen Lied (2004) (Chief Kakuzawa)
- Madlax (2004) (Guen McNichol)
- Monster (2004) (Mr. Liebert)
- Naruto (2005) (Kaguya Clan Patriarch)
- Bio Booster Armor Guyver (2005) (Richard Guyot)
- Angel Heart (2006) (Li Jiang Qiang/Li Qian De)
- Jyu-Oh-Sei (2006) (Odin)
- Kiba (2006) (Professor Bender, Dimitri Caan)
- Baccano! (2007) (Szilard Quates)
- Inazuma Eleven (2008) (Seigō Hibiki)
- Bleach (2009) (Ginrei Kuchiki)
- Fullmetal Alchemist: Brotherhood (2009) (Knox)

2010s

- Giant Killing (2010) (Hiraizumi)
- Iron Man (2010) (Professor Michelinie)
- Chihayafuru (2011) (Hajime Wataya)
- Supernatural:The Anime Series (2011) (Jason) (ep. 5)
- Psycho-Pass (2012) (Tomomi Masaoka)
- Space Brothers (2012) (Eddie Jay)
- Kill la Kill (2013) (Isshin Matoi/Soichiro Kiryuin)
- JoJo's Bizarre Adventure: Stardust Crusaders (2014) (Cameo)
- Future Card Buddyfight (2014) (Azi Dahaka)
- Rakudai Kishi no Cavalry (2015) (Ryōma Kurogane)
- Case Closed (2016) (Nagai Tokujiro) (ep. 829)
- citrus (2017) (chairman)

=== Theatrical animation ===
- Initial D Third Stage (2001) (Ken Kogashiwa)
- Detective Conan: Strategy Above the Depths (2005) (Kensuke Niimi)
- Inazuma Eleven: Saikyō Gundan Ōga Shūrai (2010) (Admiral Hibiki)
- Mardock Scramble (2011) (Professor Faceman)
- Space Brothers #0 (2014) (Eddie Jay)
- Psycho-Pass: Sinners of the System (2019) (Masaoka)

=== Original video animation ===
- Please Save My Earth (1993) (La Zlo)
- Eight Clouds Rising (1997) (Ushio Fuzuchi)
- Blue Submarine No. 6 (1998) (Iga Tokuhiro)
- Golgo 13: Queen Bee (1998) (Robert Hardy)
- Street Fighter Alpha: Generations (2005) (Goutetsu)
- Mobile Suit Gundam Unicorn (2010) (Ricardo Marcenas)

=== Video games ===
- Mansion of Hidden Souls (1993)
- Tactics Ogre: Let Us Cling Together (1995) (Duke Juda Ronwey)
- Tengai Makyō: Daiyon no Mokushiroku (1997) (General Custer)
- Skies of Arcadia (2000) (Galcian)
- Sonic Adventure 2 (2001) (President)
- Legaia 2: Duel Saga (2001) (Kazan)
- Arc the Lad: Twilight of the Spirits (2003) (Volk)
- Lifeline (2003) (Joe Powers)
- Kuon (2004) (Dōman Ashiya)
- Detroit: Become Human (2018, Japanese dub) (Carl Manfred)

=== Dubbing roles ===
==== Live-action ====
- Christopher Walken
  - Basquiat (The Interviewer)
  - Last Man Standing (Hickey)
  - America's Sweethearts (Hal Weidmann)
  - Gigli (Detective Stanley Jacobellis)
  - The Rundown (Cornelius Bernard Hatcher)
  - Envy (J-Man)
  - Man on Fire (Paul Rayburn)
  - Domino (Mark Heiss)
  - Man of the Year (Jack Menken)
  - Joe Dirt 2: Beautiful Loser (Anthony Benedetti/Clem Doore/Gert B. Frobe)
- Jeremy Irons
  - Kingdom of Heaven (Raymond III of Tripoli)
  - Eragon (Brom)
  - The Correspondence (Ed Phoerum)
  - Assassin's Creed (Alan Rikkin)
  - Red Sparrow (General Vladimir Andreievich Korchnoi)
- Dennis Farina
  - Romeo Is Bleeding (Nick Gazzara)
  - Out of Sight (Marshall Sisco)
  - Saving Private Ryan (Lt. Col. Walter Anderson)
  - Reindeer Games (Jack Bangs)
- 3:10 to Yuma (Byron McElroy (Peter Fonda))
- Apollo 13 (Ken Mattingly (Gary Sinise))
- Ballistic: Ecks vs. Sever (Robert Gant / Agent Clark (Gregg Henry))
- Bean (General Newton (Burt Reynolds))
- A Beautiful Mind (William Parcher (Ed Harris))
- Better Call Saul (Mike Ehrmantraut (Jonathan Banks))
- Black Hawk Down (William F. Garrison (Sam Shepard))
- Blackjack (Tim Hastings (Fred Williamson))
- Blades of Glory (Coach Robert (Craig T. Nelson))
- Boogie Nights (Jack Horner (Burt Reynolds))
- Breaking Bad (Mike Ehrmantraut (Jonathan Banks))
- Congo (R.B. Travis (Joe Don Baker))
- The Core (General Thomas Purcell (Richard Jenkins))
- Criminal Minds (Jason Gideon (Mandy Patinkin))
- The Crucible (Reverend Samuel Parris (Bruce Davison))
- Damien (John Lyons (Scott Wilson))
- Desperado (Bucho (Cesar) (Joaquim de Almeida))
- Die Hard with a Vengeance (1998 Fuji TV edition) (Ricky Walsh (Anthony Peck))
- Dirty Sexy Money (Patrick "Tripp" Darling II (Donald Sutherland))
- Dr. No (Dr. No (Joseph Wiseman))
- End of Days (2001 TV Asahi edition) (Dr. Abel (Udo Kier))
- The Exorcist: Director's Cut (William F. Kinderman (Lee J. Cobb))
- Fast Five (Hernan Reyes (Joaquim de Almeida))
- Flight of the Phoenix (Ian (Hugh Laurie))
- Forrest Gump (Lieutenant Dan Taylor (Gary Sinise))
- Frailty (Wesley Doyle (Powers Boothe))
- Frasier (Martin Crane (John Mahoney))
- Gandhi (Judge R. S. Broomfield (Trevor Howard))
- Going in Style (Joe Harding (Michael Caine))
- Grandma (Karl (Sam Elliott))
- Gutshot Straight (Duffy (Stephen Lang))
- Halloween (Dr. Samuel Loomis (Malcolm McDowell))
- Hannah Montana: The Movie (Mr. Bradley (Barry Bostwick))
- Home Alone (1994 Fuji TV edition) (Peter (John Heard))
- Home Alone 2: Lost in New York (1997 Fuji TV edition) (Peter (John Heard))
- Horrible Bosses (Jack Pellitt (Donald Sutherland))
- I, Frankenstein (Naberius (Bill Nighy))
- The Imitation Game (Cdr. Alastair Denniston (Charles Dance))
- Indiana Jones and the Last Crusade (2009 WOWOW edition) (Marcus Brody (Denholm Elliott))
- Interstellar (Professor Brand (Michael Caine))
- JAG (A.J. Chegwidden (John M. Jackson))
- Jingle All the Way (2000 Fuji TV edition) (Ted Maltin (Phil Hartman))
- Kite (Karl Aker (Samuel L. Jackson))
- Licence to Kill (1999 TV Asahi edition) (Franz Sanchez (Anthony Zerbe))
- The Living Daylights (1998 TV Asahi edition) (General Leonid Pushkin (John Rhys-Davies))
- The Long Kiss Goodnight (Perkins (Patrick Malahide))
- Mars Attacks! (2000 TV Tokyo edition) (Maurice (Barbet Schroeder))
- The Matrix Reloaded (The Architect (Helmut Bakaitis))
- The Matrix Revolutions (The Architect (Helmut Bakaitis))
- Meet Joe Black (Quince (Jeffrey Tambor))
- The Merchant of Venice (Shylock (Al Pacino))
- The Messenger: The Story of Joan of Arc (The Conscience (Dustin Hoffman))
- Miller's Crossing (Eddie Dane (J. E. Freeman))
- Miracles (Chief Inspector Ho (Richard Ng))
- Mission: Impossible – Rogue Nation (Chairman (Nigel Barber))
- NCIS (Thomas Morrow (Alan Dale))
- Nick of Time (Brendan Grant (Peter Strauss))
- Ocean's Thirteen (Willy Bank (Al Pacino))
- Oz (Vernon Schillinger (J. K. Simmons))
- Passenger 57 (Stuart Ramsey (Bruce Greenwood))
- Psycho (2010 Blu-Ray edition) (Private Investigator Milton Arbogast (Martin Balsam))
- Public Enemies (Charles Winstead (Stephen Lang))
- Radio (Harold Jones (Ed Harris))
- Raiders of the Lost Ark (2012 DVD edition) (Marcus Brody (Denholm Elliott))
- The Rainbow Thief (2017 Blu-ray edition) (Uncle Rudolf (Christopher Lee))
- Reservoir Dogs (Mister Pink (Steve Buscemi))
- Seven (1999 TV Tokyo edition) (District Attorney Martin Talbot (Richard Roundtree))
- She-Wolf of London (Dr. Stevens (Pavel Douglas))
- Shiri (Chief Agent (Yoon Joo-sang))
- Shoot 'Em Up (Hammerson (Stephen McHattie))
- Shutter Island (Dr. John Cawley (Ben Kingsley))
- The Silence of the Lambs (Jack Crawford (Scott Glenn))
- Sleepless in Seattle (Greg (Victor Garber))
- Stargate SG-1 (Jack O'Neill (Richard Dean Anderson))
- Star Wars: Episode II – Attack of the Clones (Lama Su (Anthony Phelan))
- Star Wars: The Force Awakens (Lor San Tekka (Max von Sydow))
- Stephen King's Desperation (Johnny Marinville (Tom Skerritt))
- The Sugarland Express (Captain Harlin Tanner (Ben Johnson))
- Switchback (Deputy Nate Braden (Ted Levine))
- Tears of the Sun (Captain Bill Rhodes (Tom Skerritt))
- Transformers: Dark of the Moon (President Nixon)
- Ultraman Powered (Colonel Essex (John McCann))
- Underworld: Blood Wars (Cassius (James Faulkner))
- Westworld (The Man in Black (Ed Harris))
- What Lies Beneath (Warren Feur (James Remar))
- The X-Files: I Want to Believe (Father Joseph Crissman (Billy Connolly))

==== Animation ====
- The Animatrix (Dan's Dad)
- Antz (General Mandible)
- Babar the Elephant (King Babar)
- Cars 3 (Smokey)
- Fantasia 2000 (Itzhak Perlman)
- Invasion America (General Konrad)
- Next Avengers: Heroes of Tomorrow (Tony Stark/Iron Man)
- Spider-Man (Iceberg)
- Star Wars The Clone Wars (Lama Su)
- Totally Spies! (Terence Lewis)
- Totally Spies! The Movie (Terence Lewis)
- Transformers: Animated (Yoketron)
- Transformers: Prime (Alpha Trion)
