= Zhanna Pliyeva =

Russian composer (1949–2023)

Zhanna Vasil'yevna Pliyeva (Russian: Жа́нна Васи́льевна Пли́ева; 10 February 1949 – 22 January 2023) was a Soviet and Russian composer and pianist.

== Life ==
Zhanna Pliyeva was born in Tskhinvali, Southern Ossetia. She studied music at the Rimsky-Korsakov State Conservatory, Leningrad, with Dmitry Svetozarov for piano and with Orest Yevlakhov and Alexander Mnatsakanian for composition. In 1979 she worked as an assistant to Sergey Slonimsky, and later as an orchestra musician, researcher, and teacher, and from 1979 to 1985 as director of the Tskhinvali School of Music. After 1990 she became a full-time composer.

== Honors and awards ==
- Prize-winner in the All-Union Composers 'Competition in 1977
- Prize-winner in the Tokyo International Composers' Competition, 1993
- Honoured Artist of Republic of Northern Ossetia-Alania, 1993
- President of the Presidium of the Georgian Music Society, 1989-90

== Works ==
Pliyeva's works are often based on the folklore of the Mountain People of the northern Caucasus. She has composed for stage, orchestra, and choral, instrumental and vocal solo performance. Selected works include:

- Children of the Sun (children's opera, 2, Georgy Dzugayev), 1981
- Fatima (ballet), 1982-84
- The Passion of Adam (passion play, 2), 1993
- Symphony no.1, S, perc, str
- Symphony no.2, 1976
- Symphony no.3, 1978
- Symphony no.4, 1990–91
- Symphony no.5, 1994
- Music for Strings, 1996
- About My Homeland (Georgy Dzugayev), chorus, pf, 1979
- Comic Song, 1979
- A Nightingale Sings, female vv, 1979
- Sospeso (understated), female vv, 2 prep pfs
- Chenena (trans.), genre scene, 1987
- I'm Listening... It's Gone Quiet... (trad.), 4 choruses for Children, 1987
- Prelyudii for piano 1970-72
- Poem, Tokkata, for piano 5 sarcastic, 4 fugues, 1963–75
- Minatyurï, for children, 1978,
- Ritual, 1978
- Triads for piano, 1978
- Tokkatina, for piano, 1979
- A Trip to the Zoo, for Children, piano, 1980
- Sonatas for piano: 1982, 1984, 1990, 1995
- From Ossetian Epos (trad.), song cycle, S, T, pf, 1977
- Caesar's Monologue (Georgy Bestouty), 1988
- Autumn Reveries (Leo Kotsta), S, pf, 1989
