= Chickenlover =

- South Park episode
- Episode no.: Season 2 Episode 4
- Directed by: Trey Parker
- Written by: Trey Parker; Matt Stone; David R. Goodman
- Production code: 203
- Original air date: May 27, 1998

Episode chronology
← Previous "Ike's Wee Wee"	Next → "Conjoined Fetus Lady"
- South Park season 2

"Chickenlover" is the fourth episode of the second season of the American animated television series South Park. The 17th episode of the series overall, it originally aired on Comedy Central in the United States on May 27, 1998. It marks the first appearance of a character which would later evolve into Stephen Stotch, who is Butters Stotch’s father in later seasons, as well as a more finalised design for Randy Marsh. The episode was written by series co-creators Trey Parker and Matt Stone, along with David R. Goodman, and directed by Parker. In the episode, Officer Barbrady resigns as South Park's only police officer because of his illiteracy. Anarchy ensues, just as chickens are mysteriously being molested across South Park. Barbrady enlists the help of the boys to learn to read and discover who is molesting the chickens. Cartman, meanwhile, masquerades as a police officer.

== Plot ==
Stan Marsh, Kyle Broflovski, Kenny McCormick, and Eric Cartman visit the Booktastic Bus, a mobile library. They are initially intrigued, but become uninterested in reading after meeting the strange driver. Word spreads that a pervert is molesting chickens in town. When Officer Barbrady starts the investigation, he is confronted with his illiteracy, which is depicted as him seeing strange symbols in place of letters. He resigns in shame and anarchy immediately breaks out. Later, he is put into the boys' class to learn to read.

Barbrady recruits the boys to help him with his task, showing his knowledge of the police code. From then on, Cartman patrols the town on his Big Wheel, enforcing his own brand of justice. The molester is finally caught in the petting zoo and turns out to be the bookmobile driver. He plotted this all along to encourage Barbrady to learn to read. After Barbrady is given a copy of Ayn Rand's Atlas Shrugged, Cartman arrives on the scene and finds out that the bookmobile driver was the molester, to which he responds by whacking him in the kneecap with his nightstick; this prompts Barbrady to show Cartman how to properly deal with criminals, by clubbing the bookmobile driver in the head with his own nightstick. The town holds a parade for Barbrady, and when he is asked to give a speech, he reveals how Atlas Shrugged convinced him to never read again. As the end credits play, Kenny, who has narrowly avoided death multiple times earlier throughout the episode, finally dies when a tree falls over and crushes him beneath it.

== Production ==
Originally, Cartman was supposed to receive a gun during his stint as a deputy police officer, but Comedy Central's censors were reluctant to show a child with a firearm. The season one episode "Volcano" depicted children wielding firearms, but it was allowed then as the usage was considered less controversial by Comedy Central. The episode was originally titled "Chickenfucker", but it was changed as Comedy Central did not want any profane wording in any of its titles.

== Broadcast ==
"Chickenlover" was originally broadcast on Comedy Central in the United States on May 27, 1998. The second season of the show started in April 1998, with two episodes. Then, on May 20, the episode "Ike's Wee Wee" started a six-episode run of the season.

== Home media ==
"Chickenlover" was released on VHS in April 1999, along with the episode "Ike's Wee Wee", on a video titled South Park: Volume 8. The episode saw its first DVD release in December 1999, on a disc called South Park: Volume 4, which also included "Chickenlover", as well as "Cartman's Mom Is a Dirty Slut" and "Cartman's Mom Is Still a Dirty Slut". South Park: The Complete Second Season was released on DVD on June 3, 2003.
