= 1998 in anime =

The events of 1998 in anime.

== Events ==
- May 20, 1998 - Animax, a Japanese anime satellite television network, is created

== Accolades ==
At the Mainichi Film Awards, Doraemon: Nobita's Great Adventure in the South Seas won the Animation Film Award and Mizu no Sei Kappa Hyakuzu won the Ōfuji Noburō Award.

== Releases ==
English name	Japanese name (kanji and romaji)	Type	Demographic	Regions
The Adventures of Mini-Goddess	ああっ女神さまっ 小っちゃいって事は便利だねっ (Aa! Megami-sama! Chicchaitte Koto wa Benri da ne)	TV	Seinen	
All Purpose Cultural Cat Girl Nuku Nuku	万能文化猫娘 (Bannō Bunka Nekomusume)	TV		
Beast Wars II: Lio Convoy's Close Call!	ビーストウォーズII ライオコンボイ危機一髪! (Bīsuto Wōzu Sekando: Raio Konboi Kiki Ippatsu!)	Movie		
Bomberman B-Daman Bakugaiden	ボンバーマン・ビーダマン爆外伝 (Bombāman Bī-daman Bakugaiden)	TV		
Brain Powered	ブレンパワード (Buren Pawādo)	TV		
Burn-Up Excess		TV		
Blue Submarine No. 6	青の6号 (Ao no Roku-gō)	OVA series		
Bubblegum Crisis Tokyo 2040	バブルガムクライシス TOKYO 2040 (Baburugamu Kuraishisu TOKYO 2040)	TV		
Cardcaptor Sakura	カードキャプターさくら (Kādokyaputā Sakura)	TV		
Case Closed: The Fourteenth Target	名探偵コナン 14番目の標的（ターゲット） (Meitantei Conan: Jūyon Banme no Target)	Movie		
Cowboy Bebop	カウボーイビバップ (Kaubōi Bibappu)	TV		
Crayon Shin-chan: Blitzkrieg! Pig's Hoof's Secret Mission	クレヨンしんちゃん 電撃! ブタのヒヅメ大作戦 (Crayon Shin-chan: Dengeki! Buta no Hizume Daisakusen)	Movie	Seinen	
Cyber Team in Akihabara	アキハバラ電脳組 (Akihabara Dennō Gumi)	TV		
Devil Lady	デビルマンレディー (Debiruman Redī)	TV	Seinen	
Doraemon: Nobita's Great Adventure in the South Seas	映画ドラえもん のび太の南海大冒険 (Eiga Doraemon: Nobita no Nankai Daibōken)	Movie		
El-Hazard: The Alternative World	異次元の世界エルハザード (Ijigen no Sekai Eru Hazādo)	TV		
Fake	フェイク (Feiku)	OVA		
Fire Force DNAsights 999.9	火聖旅団 ダナサイト999.9 (Kasei Ryodan Danasaito 999.9)	OVA		
Flint the Time Detective	時空探偵ゲンシクン (Jikū Tantei Genshi-kun)	TV		
Galaxy Express 999: Eternal Fantasy	銀河鉄道999 エターナルファンタジー (Ginga Tetsudō Surī Nain: Eternal Fantasy)	Movie		
Gasaraki	ガサラキ	TV		
Geobreeders: File-X – Get Back the Kitty	ジオブリーダーズ File-X ちびねこ奪還 (Jioburīdāzu Fairu Ekkus Chibi Neko Dakkan)	OVA		
Golgo 13: Queen Bee	ゴルゴ13〜QUEEN BEE〜 (Gorugo Sātīn: Kuīn Bī)	OVA	Seinen	
Gundam Wing: Endless Waltz -Special Edition-	新機動戦記ガンダムW Endless Waltz 特別篇 (Shin Kidō Senki Gandamu Uingu: Endoresu Warutsu Supesharu)	Movie		
His and Her Circumstances	彼氏彼女の事情 (Kareshi Kanojo no Jijō)	TV		
If I See You in My Dreams	夢で逢えたら (Yume de Aetara)	TV		
Initial D	頭文字 D (Inisharu Dī)	TV	Seinen	
Kite	A カイト (A Kaito)	OVA		
Let's Go! Anpanman: The Palm of the Hand to the Sun	それいけ! アンパンマン てのひらを太陽に (Soreike! Anpanman Tenohira o Taiyō ni)	Movie		
Lost Universe	ロスト・ユニバース (Rosuto Yunibāsu)	TV		
Lupin III: Crisis in Tokyo	Rupan Sansei: Honō no Kioku ~Tokyo Crisis~ (ルパン三世『炎の記憶 ～Tokyo Crisis』)	TV		
Master Keaton	MASTERキートン (Masutā Kīton)	TV		
MAZE ☆ The Mega-Burst Space: The Giant of Temporary Threat	MAZE☆爆熱時空 天変脅威の大巨人 (Maze Bakunetsu Jikū: Tenpen Kyōi no Giant)	Movie		
Mobile Suit Gundam: The 08th MS Team – Miller's Report	機動戦士ガンダム 第08MS小隊 ミラーズ・リポート (Kidō Senshi Gundam: Dai 08 MS Shōtai – Miller's Report)	Movie		
Neo Ranga	南海奇皇(ネオランガ) (Nankai Kiou (Neoranga))	TV		
Nightwalker: The Midnight Detective	ナイトウォーカー真夜中の探偵 (Naitouōkā Mayonaka no Tantei)	TV		
Ninja Resurrection	魔界転生地獄編 (Makai Tenshō: Jigoku Hen)	TV		
Outlaw Star	星方武侠アウトロースター (Seihō Bukyō Autorō Sutā)	TV		
Pokémon: The First Movie	劇場版ポケットモンスター ミュウツーの逆襲 (Gekijōban Poketto Monsutā: Myūtsū no Gyakushū)	Movie		
Record of Lodoss War: Chronicles of the Heroic Knight	ロードス島戦記 英雄騎士伝 (Rōdosu-tō Senki: Eiyū Kishiden)	TV		
Serial Experiments Lain	シリアルエクスペリメンツレイン	TV		
Shadow Skill: Eigi	SHADOW SKILL -影技- (Shadō Sukiru Eigi)	TV	Shōnen	
Silent Möbius	サイレントメビウス (Sairento Mebiusu)	TV		
Slayers Gorgeous	スレイヤーズごうじゃす (Sureiyāzu Gōjasu)	Movie		
Spriggan	スプリガン (Supurigan)	Movie		
Steam Detectives	快傑蒸気探偵団 (Kaiketsu Jouki Tanteidan)	TV		
Super Milk Chan	スーパーミルクちゃん (Sūpā Miruku Chan)	TV		
Tora-san's Forget Me Not	男はつらいよ ～寅次郎忘れな草～ (Otoko wa Tsurai yo: Torajirō Wasure na Kusa)	TV		
Touch: Miss Lonely Yesterday	タッチ Miss Lonely Yesterday あれから君は... (Tatchi Misu Rōnrī Iesutādei Are kara Kimi ha...)	TV		
Trigun	トライガン (Toraigan)	TV		
Very Private Lesson		OVA		
Yu-Gi-Oh!	遊☆戯☆王 (Yū-Gi-Ō!)	TV		
Kouin Tenshi: Haitoku no Lycéenne		OVA		
Yokohama Kaidashi Kikou	ヨコハマ買い出し紀行	OVA	Seinen	

== Deaths ==
- Yoshifumi Kondō
- Kazuo Harada
- Shigezō Sasaoka

== See also ==
- 1998 in animation
