= Eli Bauer =

American cartoonist and animation layout and story man

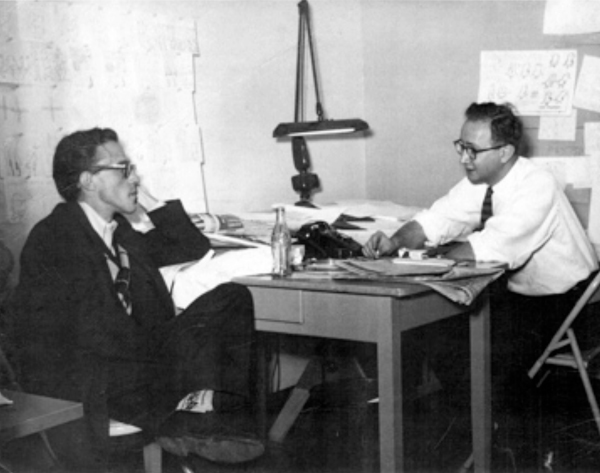
Eli Bauer (left) and Jules Feiffer

Elias "Eli" Bauer (17 November 1928 – 7 January 1998) was an animation layout and story man and comics artist, having his cartoons appear in such magazines as Saturday Evening Post, Colliers, Playboy, Penthouse, and Punch.

== Biography ==
He was born in The Bronx, New York, to Max and Goldie Bauer. It was his passion for art that took him out of the Bronx and into Manhattan, where he attended the School of Industrial Arts.

He went on to become a storyman and layout artist working for Ray Patin Productions in Hollywood, California, and for Terrytoons in New Rochelle, New York. While at Terrytoons, Bauer created the popular animated character "Hector Heathcote", the Minute and a Half Man. He also freelanced and found success with his own comic strips "Kermit the Hermit" and "Norman" and formed a production company, Ariel Productions, with the late Al Kouzel that created Sesame Street animated spots, commercials and continued the Winky Dink and You TV series.

He later concentrated on writing and drawing his own "gags" for such well known magazines as Playboy, Penthouse, Punch, Collier's Weekly and Omni. Also, he helped design the animation for the ill-after game show pilot "Malcolm" with Merrill Heatter and host Alex Trebek (1983).

In 1958, Bauer married Norma (Dianne) Littlejohn. They had three children, Nyles Bauer (born 1961), Aimee Bauer (1962) and Laura Bauer (1965).
