= Georgy Dzugayev =

Ossetian writer

Georgy Khasakoyevich Dzugayev (Russian: Георгий Хасакоевич Дзугаев, Iron Ossetic: Георги Дзугаты; 1911 - 1985) was an Ossetian writer. He was captured during World War II and became a prisoner of war; he escaped in February 1945 and fought with the Red Army. After the war, he worked with the Ossetic language magazine Herald until his death.
