= The Magic Pipe =

- Directed by: Mikhail Tumelya
- Written by: Viktor Genkin; Ligia Gapuzova
- Produced by: Lidiya Gapuzova; Aleksey Guskov; Sergey Zernov
- Starring: Aslanbek Aruyegov; A. Bykov; D. Matveyev; V. Kovalkov; Yuriy Sarantsev
- Cinematography: Aleksandr Betev
- Edited by: Lidia Volohova; Irina Aleksenko
- Music by: Yuriy Pryalin; Zhanna Pliyeva
- Release date: 1998 (Russia)
- Running time: 50 min
- Country: Russia
- Language: Russian

The Magic Pipe (Russian: Волше́бная свире́ль, Volshebnaya svirel) is a 1998 Russian stop motion-animated feature film directed by Mikhail Tumelya. Work on the film started in 1993, and it was Russia's fifth feature-length animation to be released after the collapse of the Soviet Union (the first was Underwater Berets in 1991). Over 120 puppets were used in the film. The funds came largely from FAF Entertainment.

It was released theatrically at a number of film festivals before being released on VHS by Extra Video.

== Plot ==
A grandfather tells his grandson a bedtime story about an ancient Nart named Saynag-Aldar who lives in a castle on a hill. Saynag-Aldar decides to find a husband for his daughter Agunda. He proclaims a contest to see who among the Narts is the most fit, with the gods in heaven deciding the winner. The famous bogatyr Soslan wins the contest, boasting that no-one in the world is stronger than him. Agunda asks her father to make him prove this. Saynad-Aldar agrees, and sends Soslan away to travel the world and search for anyone who is his match. His traveling companion is the shepherd Atsamaz, who secretly loves Agunda.

Before they leave, Agunda hears the music of Atsamaz's pipe, and follows its sound. They meet, and he tells her that the music is for her. Agunda asks Atsamaz to give her his pipe as a symbol of his love, but he refuses, explaining that it is a present from the gods. When she tells him that this means he doesn't love her, Atsamaz breaks the pipe in anger and storms away. Agunda regrets her words, gathers up the pieces of the pipe, and goes back to the castle.

They venture out into the proud tribes that surround the lands of the Narts, and defeat all whom they come across. Finally, they come across a burial site for fallen Narts, where gods are said to grant wishes. Atsamaz suggests that they should leave an offering, but Soslan declines, saying that they have not helped him, and that he will give them 100 deer if they will find him a worthy adversary. Unknown to Soslan, the gods hear his wish.

They transport the two of them to a faraway land, where gigantic man-eating cyclops live. Soslan walks up to one of them, named Uaig, and challenges him. Uaig laughs at them, and asks Soslan to try to pull out one of the hairs on the bottom of his leg. When Soslan is unable to do this, he sends them to a cave where they may find a "more worthy adversary". As they come into the cave, they are grabbed by Uaig's mother. While Soslan tries to challenge her as well, Atsamaz says "let this day bring you fortune, part of my mother". Upon hearing this, she lets them down and says that they are her guests for the day. She hides them in her dress. When Uaig comes into the cave, she feeds him a broth and puts him to sleep, and then transports Soslan and Atsamaz back to their homeland. Uaig sees them go, and follows them. He comes to the valley of the Narts and causes destruction; nobody is able to stop him. A god comes to Agunda, rejoins the broken pieces of the pipe, and tells her to give the pipe to Atsamaz. She does this, and Atsamaz begins to play his melody. The song disorients Uaig, and allows Soslan to shoot an arrow which goes straight through his one eye, causing him to crumble. Soslan proudly declares victory, but there is silence in the valley; all around him are the dead and the dying.

After the Narts rebuild, Agunda marries Atsamaz. Soslan concedes that the power of love is stronger than him.

== Cast and crew ==
	English	Russian
Producers	From F.A.F. Entertainment: Aleksey Guskov; Sergey Zernov; From AF-Centre: Lidiya Gapuzova	От F.A.F. Entertainment: Алексей Гуськов; Сергей Зернов; От АФ-Центр: Лидия Гапузова
Written by	Viktor Genkin (original chronicler); Ligia Gapuzova (screenplay)	Виктор Генкин; Лидия Гапузова
Dialogues	Valery Frid; Mikhail Tumelya	Валерий Фрид; Михаил Тумеля
Directed by	Mikhail Tumelya	Михаил Тумеля
Production Designer	Dmitriy Surinovich	Дмитрий Суринович
Camera Operator	Aleksandr Betev	Александр Бетев
Music by	Zhanna Pliyeva; Yuriy Pryalin	Жанна Плиева; Юрий Прялкин
Sound director	Yan Pototskiy	Ян Потоцкий
Editors	Lidia Volohova; Irina Aleksenko	Лидия Волохова; Ирина Аксененко
Animators	Tatyana Yatsyna; Anna Lysyatova; Stanislav Speranskiy; Anna Tumelya (uncredited); Mikhail Tumelya	Татьяна Яцына; Анна Лысятова; Станислав Сперанский; Анна Тумеля; Михаил Тумеля
Live action cast	Aslanbek Archegov (grandfather); Akhsar Dudiyev (grandson)	Асланбек Арчегов (дед); Ахсар Дудиев (внук)
Voice Actors	Rudolph Pankov (narrator); Dmitri Matveyev (Soslan); Andrei Grinevich (Atsamaz); Olga Golovanova (Agunda); Yuriy Sarantsev (Saynag-Aldar); V. Kovalkov (Uaig); Venera Rakhimova (mother of Uaig); Aleksandr Lenkov (Afsati); Alexander Bykov; N. Baronina; Yuriy Malyarov; L. Masharova; Tatyana Rodionova; Daniil Netrebin; Boris Tokarev	Рудольф Панков (рассказчик); Дмитрий Матвеев (Сослан); Андрей Гриневич (Ацамаз); Ольга Голованова (Агунда); Юрий Саранцев (Сайнаг-Алдар); В. Ковальков (Уаиг); Венера Рахимова (мать Уаига); Александр Леньков (Афсати); Александр Быков; Н. Баронина; Юрий Маляров; Л. Машарова; Татьяна Родионова; Даниил Нетребин; Борис Токарев
Actor assistant	T. Vinogradova	Т. Виноградова
Puppets and decorations	Tatyana Volkova; Vladimir Shchegolkov; T. Gorchakova; T. Yevmenova; Ye. Zaytseva; N. Lebedeva; D. Mashkov; L. Orlova; V. Podobed; Ye. Samsonova; S. Sviridovich; M. Strotsev	Татьяна Волкова; Владимир Щегольков; Т. Горчакова; Т. Евменова; Е. Зайцева; Н. Лебедева; Д. Машков; Л. Орлова; В. Подобед; Е. Самсонова; С. Свиридович; М. Строцев

== Awards ==
- 1998—Moscow "Zolotaya rybka" (golden fish) festival: Grand Prix of the international jury
- 1999—"Orlyonok" Festival of Visual Arts: Grand Prix
- 1999—Kecskemét International Festival of Animated Feature Films: 2nd Prize
- 1999—4th Open Russian Festival of Animated Film: Special Jury Prize
- 1999—Kyiv International Festival of Animation: Diplom "Grok"
- 2000—Moscow "Golden Vityaz" Festival: Golden Vityaz in the category Best Animated Film
- 2000—Gatchina Festival of Literature and Film: Prize for Best Film About Love

== See also ==
- History of Russian animation
- List of animated feature films
- List of stop-motion films
