= The Mexican Staring Frog of Southern Sri Lanka =

- South Park episode
- Episode no.: Season 2 Episode 6
- Directed by: Trey Parker
- Written by: Trey Parker; Matt Stone
- Production code: 206
- Original air date: June 10, 1998

Episode chronology
← Previous "Conjoined Fetus Lady"	Next → "City on the Edge of Forever"
- South Park season 2

"The Mexican Staring Frog of Southern Sri Lanka" is the sixth episode in the second season of the American animated television series South Park. The 19th episode of the series overall, it originally aired on Comedy Central in the United States on June 10, 1998. The episode was written by series co-creators Trey Parker and Matt Stone, and directed by Parker.

In the episode, the deadly "Mexican Staring Frog of Southern Sri Lanka" is sighted in South Park and the town's fearless hunters, Ned and Jimbo, are on the case. Their heroic efforts drive up the ratings for their hunting show and threaten to edge out Jesus's television show, Jesus and Pals.

== Plot ==
The boys are assigned to interview Vietnam War veterans; they interview Stan's uncle, Jimbo, and his friend, Ned, at the set of their own television show called Huntin' and Killin'. The two claim that they single-handedly defeated the entire Viet Cong army, returning to base just in time to ride the log flume ride at the amusement park section of the camp. Both Mr. Garrison and Mr. Mackey think they fabricated their report and not only fail them, but give them detention for the week. The boys plot revenge on Jimbo and Ned by making bogus videos of the legendary "Mexican Staring Frog of Southern Sri Lanka", which Jimbo and Ned then air on Huntin' and Killin'.

The show becomes successful, leading to a decline in ratings for their competitors, including the talk show Jesus and Pals, starring Jesus. Its producer decides to change the show's format to resemble the "trash TV" format, despite Jesus' lack of enthusiasm for the idea. Meanwhile, Jimbo and Ned go searching for the Staring Frog, which can supposedly kill with a glance. Ned sees the fake frog the boys set up and becomes comatose from pure fear. While visiting him in the hospital, the boys confess their misdeed. This leads to Jimbo, Ned, and the boys all appearing on Jesus and Pals, arranged by the show's producer.

Without Jesus' knowledge, the producer arranges for them to lie on the air to improve ratings; she has Jimbo lie that Stan is a drug-addicted satanist, while Stan retorts by lying that Jimbo molested him. This escalates into riot in the studio (in a parody of the Jerry Springer Show), that results in Kenny being torn in two by crazed audience members. Jesus angrily silences the crowd and the lie is revealed. Stan apologizes for making up the stories about the Mexican Staring Frog of Southern Sri Lanka, and Jimbo apologizes for telling Stan that he defeated the entire Viet Cong Army. Although Ned is still comatose at the end of the episode, Jimbo reassures the boys he'll snap him out of it by showing him hardcore pornography. Jesus decides that he will put his old show back, and as punishment to his producer, he sends her to Hell, where she meets Satan with his partner Saddam Hussein, much to her horror.

== Home media ==
All 18 episodes of the second season, including "The Mexican Staring Frog of Southern Sri Lanka", were released on a DVD box set on June 3, 2003.
