= Golgo 13: Queen Bee =

1998 action adventure anime OVA

- Western DVD cover from Urban Vision Entertainment
- Directed by: Osamu Dezaki
- Screenplay by: Akihiro Tago
- Based on: Golgo 13 by Takao Saito
- Produced by: Takayuki Nagasawa; Sumio Udagawa; Hitoshi Yoshimura
- Starring: Tesshō Genda; Akio Ōtsuka; Masako Katsuki; Ryūsei Nakao; Kinryū Arimoto
- Cinematography: Hajime Noguchi; Hirokata Takahashi
- Edited by: Seiji Morita
- Music by: Fujimaru Yoshino
- Production companies: Filmlink International; Goodhill Vision; Tezuka Productions
- Distributed by: BMG Victor
- Release date: 21 May 1998
- Running time: 57 minutes
- Country: Japan
- Language: Japanese

Golgo 13: Queen Bee (ゴルゴ13〜QUEEN BEE〜) is an original video animation that was released in 1998. Tesshō Genda provides the voice of Golgo 13 in the Japanese version, while in the English version, he is voiced by John DiMaggio. The film is set during the 2000 U.S. presidential election cycle and focuses on professional hitman Golgo 13, who is hired by a Democratic Party campaign manager to stop a female drug lord from assassinating the Democratic presidential nominee. Golgo, however, finds the job too easy and seeks to discover the true connection.

Produced by Tezuka Productions in association with Filmlink International and Goodhill Vision, Golgo 13: Queen Bee was released on 21 May 1998 in Japan by BMG Victor, and on DVD in English-speaking regions in 2001 by Urban Vision Entertainment.

== Plot ==
During the 2000 U.S. presidential election cycle, Democratic Party campaign manager and vice presidential candidate Thomas Waltham hires Golgo 13 to assassinate Queen Bee, the second-in-command of the South American terrorist group Comnerro Liberation Front, to prevent her from killing Democratic nominee Robert Hardy. At a local bar, Golgo's informant tells him Queen Bee's real name is Sonia, and she is planning to distribute cocaine throughout the United States with help from mafia boss Don Roccini. He speculates that she wants to kill Hardy because he represents a threat to her drug operation. Golgo considers the job too easy and seeks to find the true connection. Not long after, Sonia arrives and confronts Golgo. She invites him to her hotel room to have sex, then she asks him to assassinate Hardy for $1.2 million, but he declines the job. Sonia learns that Golgo marked her for assassination, but he lets her escape.

Meanwhile, Waltham heads to California with U.S. Army General Gordon to hire a disgraced lieutenant named Benning to wipe out the Comnerro. Golgo's informant comes back from Utah with information on Hardy's past: When Hardy was a lawyer, he had an affair with a woman named Vanessa, who gave birth to a child named Joanna. After Hardy was elected to the U.S. House of Representatives, Vanessa and Joanna disappeared. The informant notes that if Joanna is still alive, she would be the same age as Sonia.

While heading home on a cargo ship, Sonia reminisces on her past. She reveals that she is Joanna Hardy, and that Waltham killed Vanessa. Waltham also raped Sonia, causing her to believe her father betrayed her. Golgo arrives at the main Comnerro base to try and kill Sonia again, but is interrupted by Benning, who launches a surprise attack that wipes out most of Sonia's men, forcing Golgo and Sonia to fend off Benning's men. Golgo kills Benning, but blacks out from a severe knife wound. In exchange for helping her, Sonia heals his wounds and sleeps with him again.

A few days later, the 2000 Democratic National Convention is underway at Yankee Stadium. Shortly after the end of the convention's first day, Hardy stops his limo to meet a young girl with flowers. She calls herself Joanna, then runs back to a disguised Sonia, causing Hardy to have flashbacks of his past life. He discovers that Waltham lied about his family's fate, as he had told Hardy that Vanessa and Joanna moved to Florida, then died in a car accident.

During the final day of the convention, Hardy tries to kill Waltham during his acceptance speech, but is tackled by security guards. He then uses his gun to commit suicide, causing Sonia to break down in tears. After Hardy's funeral, Sonia arrives at her father's grave to pay respects, where she is then shot by Golgo, fulfilling his original contract. In her final moments, she tells Golgo that she put $1.2 million in his bank account for a hit — on Waltham. Sonia dies, and Golgo accepts the job. In a mid-credits scene, Golgo finds Waltham's yacht, with Waltham, Don Roccini, and General Gordon present; he kills them all, then departs the scene.

== Voice cast ==
Character	Japanese	English (Urban Vision Entertainment, 2001)
Golgo 13/Duke Togo	Tesshō Genda	John DiMaggio
Joanna Hardy/Sonia/Queen Bee	Masako Katsuki	Denise Poirier
Thomas Waltham	Ryūsei Nakao	Carlos Ferro
Robert Hardy	Kinryū Arimoto	Dwight Schultz
Informant	Akio Ōtsuka	John DiMaggio
Don Roccini	Toshiya Ueda	Joe Lala
General Gordon	Kōsei Tomita	John Hostetter
Gomez	Mugihito	Joe Lala
Benning	Naoya Uchida	Michael Sorich
Nursemaid	Unknown	Julia Fletcher
Young Soldier	Hisayoshi Izaki	Alex Fernandez
Pamela	Kachiko Hino	Barbara Goodson
Officer	Kōichi Nagano	Eddie Frierson
Maria	Mie Odagi	Unknown
Anri	Shōko Kikuchi	Susan Hickman
Antonio	Tarō Arakawa	Scott Menville
George	Wakako Taniguchi	Unknown

== Reception ==
Darius Washington and Allen Divers of Anime News Network both gave Golgo 13: Queen Bee positive reviews. Washington gave Queen Bee a rating of A−, praising the story, characters, and visuals, with his only criticism being the excessive amount of sex scenes, stating that "it's not just that these scenes exist, but they occur for seemingly no reason than just to move the video along, instead of enhancing a very harsh story." Divers gave it a B rating, calling it a "gritty political thriller that does a good job of keeping the audience on their toes. It's commentary is a bit lacking, but overall, a good step in the right direction."

Not all reviews were positive, however. Jeremy A. Beard of THEM Anime Reviews was far more critical of Queen Bee and gave it a rating of 2 out of 5 stars, calling the characters, action sequences, and the story uninteresting, and stating overall that "this movie leans heavily on style and I suppose it has some of that, but not enough to make up for everything else."
