= Conjoined Fetus Lady =

- South Park episode
- Episode no.: Season 2 Episode 5
- Directed by: Trey Parker
- Written by: Trey Parker; Matt Stone; David R. Goodman
- Production code: 205
- Original air date: June 3, 1998

Episode chronology
← Previous "Chickenlover"	Next → "The Mexican Staring Frog of Southern Sri Lanka"
- South Park season 2

"Conjoined Fetus Lady" is the fifth episode of the second season of the American animated television series South Park. The 18th episode of the series overall, it originally aired on Comedy Central in the United States on June 3, 1998. The episode was written by series co-creators Trey Parker and Matt Stone, along with David R. Goodman, and directed by Parker. In the episode, South Park Elementary's dodgeball team travels to China to compete for the dodgeball championship, while the town of South Park pays tribute to the school nurse, who is living with conjoined twin myslexia. This is the first South Park episode that is rated TV-MA.

== Plot ==
Pip, tired of being bullied, hits Kyle with a ball during dodgeball, giving him a bloody nose. Kyle is sent to Nurse Gollum, only to discover that she has a dead fetus attached to her head, due to a condition called conjoined twin myslexia. Kyle tells the others and they react in disgust, making fun of her. Kyle's mother, Sheila, attempts to educate the boys on Nurse Gollum's condition, but is confronted by an irate Sharon Marsh. Sheila, in order to remedy the unawareness apparent in people of conjoined twin myslexia, decides to help the woman, and winds up causing a "Conjoined Twin Myslexia Week" declared in South Park for its sole sufferer.

Meanwhile, the school dodgeball team becomes eligible for competitions, and goes on to fight the state competition in Denver. South Park ends up winning because Pip becomes filled with rage whenever others bully him, giving him the strength to take down the other team. In the national competition, the Washington, D.C. team forfeits because of their fear of the inevitable international opponent, China, who are brutal and merciless at dodgeball. In China, the team is dismantled until Pip is the only one left. After they are tricked into teasing him, Pip single-handedly annihilates the entire Chinese team with one throw, but by this point, everyone has decided they do not want to play dodgeball anymore since even Kenny gets killed by China's team.

In South Park, after a week of festivities, a parade is held for Nurse Gollum to give a speech. She finally snaps at the crowd that all she wants is to be treated normally and that calling this kind of attention is aggravating and counter-productive and storms off, much to their annoyance.

== Home media ==
All 18 episodes of the second season, including "Conjoined Fetus Lady", were released on a DVD box set on June 3, 2003.
