= Terrance and Phillip in Not Without My Anus =

- South Park episode
- Episode no.: Season 2 Episode 1
- Directed by: Trey Parker
- Written by: Trisha Nixon; Trey Parker; Matt Stone
- Production code: 201
- Original air date: April 1, 1998

Episode chronology
← Previous "Cartman's Mom Is a Dirty Slut"	Next → "Cartman's Mom Is Still a Dirty Slut"
- South Park season 2

"Terrance and Phillip in Not Without My Anus" is the second season premiere of the American animated television series South Park. The 14th episode of the series overall, it originally aired on Comedy Central in the United States on April 1, 1998. The episode follows the two title characters, a duo of Canadians who attempt to save their country from the dictator Saddam Hussein while performing repetitive toilet humor. Unbeknownst to them, the plan was partially set up by their rival, Scott, a critic who is often displeased by their random jokes of flatulence. The script was written by series co-creators Trey Parker and Matt Stone, along with writer Trisha Nixon.

The episode was an elaborate April Fools' Day prank on South Park fans, who were waiting to learn the identity of Cartman's father after the cliffhanger ending of the first season finale "Cartman's Mom Is a Dirty Slut". Angering viewers, the prank episode resulted in 2,000 e-mail complaints to Comedy Central within a week of the original broadcast. The broadcast date of the subsequent episode, "Cartman's Mom Is Still a Dirty Slut", was moved up in response to the complaints. "Terrance and Phillip in Not Without My Anus" received mixed reviews, with some commentators criticizing Parker and Stone for "duping" their viewers and others praising them for taking the risk. The creators cited this episode as their favorite.

== Plot ==
The episode begins with an announcement that viewers have waited for weeks for the answer to the mystery "Who Is Cartman's Father", but then points out that the answer and the cliffhanger payoff will not be revealed in this episode; instead, there is a presentation of an unrelated cartoon titled Not Without My Anus, starring Terrance and Phillip. A caption wishes the viewers a Happy April Fools' Day. The cartoon itself opens in a courtroom in Canada with Terrance on trial for the murder of a local doctor; Phillip is his lawyer while Terrance and Phillip's sworn nemesis Scott, who has had a long hatred of the duo's toilet humor, is acting as the prosecutor. Scott uses a group of airtight exhibits to prove Terrance's guilt, while Terrance's defense consists of nothing but a long string of fart jokes. The jury returns a verdict of not guilty. Angered, Scott promises vengeance. He is approached by Iraqi dictator Saddam Hussein, proposing a deal: Saddam would assist in getting Terrance and Phillip out of Canada, in exchange for Scott assisting Saddam and his Iraqi associates into Canada. Scott is apprehensive about trusting Saddam but agrees to the deal. The pair then conspires to kidnap Sally, daughter of Terrance and Celine Dion, and hold her hostage, as bait to lure Terrance and Phillip to Tehran; Saddam's soldiers would then murder Terrance and Phillip on arrival.

Terrance and Phillip become aware of the kidnapping when they receive a letter, but they immediately locate Sally upon arrival in Tehran. The duo returns Sally to her home, where Saddam has now taken control. Celine, Terrance's now ex-wife, is dating, and has become pregnant by a friend of the duo named Ugly Bob. While the couple discuss their relationship, Saddam interrupts and takes them hostage, with Celine having planned to sing at a Canadian football game. Scott has also become worried about the presence of the Iraqi soldiers in Canada but becomes infuriated when he finds that Terrance and Phillip have returned to Canada safely. He confronts Saddam about the double-cross, but Saddam's armed guards scare him into backing away. It is revealed that Saddam is trying to take over Canada as the first step in a plan for world domination. Terrance and Phillip arrive at the game. Instead of following a plan set up by Scott to commit suicide by using a bomb, they produce a new plan and put on gas masks. With brute force, everyone farts a huge gas cloud which kills Saddam and his soldiers. Scott arrives and is annoyed to find that Terrance and Phillip are still alive. Terrance, Phillip, Celine, and everyone else (excluding Scott) celebrate their freedom with a rendition of "O Canada". Photos of Hussein was shown on buildings as the viewers saw zooming out. During the credits, an announcement stating that the solution to who Cartman's father is will be answered in a few weeks is shown.

== Production ==
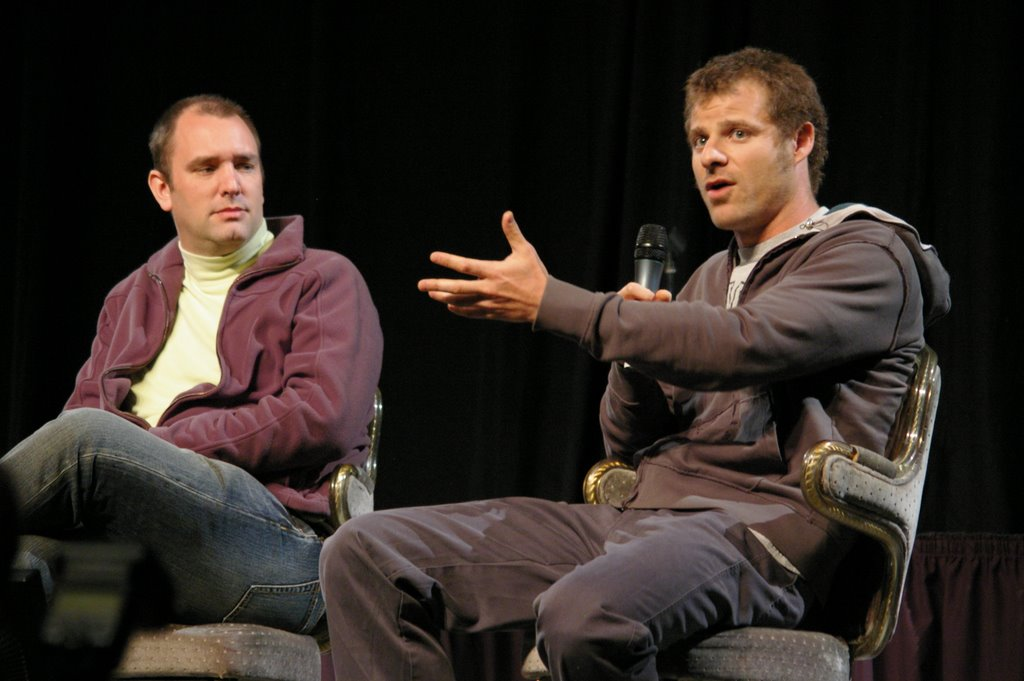
Series co-creators Parker (left) and Stone co-wrote "Not Without my Anus"

"Terrance and Philip in Not Without My Anus" was written by Trisha Nixon and South Park co-creators Trey Parker and Matt Stone and directed by Parker. It was the second season premiere and first episode centered completely around Terrance and Phillip, fictional cartoon characters within the series.

The episode first aired on April 1, 1998, as an April Fools' Day prank by Parker and Stone on South Park fans who were anxiously waiting to learn the identity of Cartman's father after the cliffhanger ending of "Cartman's Mom Is a Dirty Slut", the first season finale. Instead, Parker and Stone presented a stand-alone episode entirely focused on a Terrance and Phillip cartoon with nothing in the story about Cartman's father. Upset fans wrote 2,000 angry e-mail complaints to Comedy Central within a week of the episode's original broadcast, and media outlets said some fans harbored a grudge against the show more than five years after the episode was broadcast. Comedy Central moved the airing of "Cartman's Mom Is Still a Dirty Slut"—the subsequent episode which resolved the cliffhanger—from the previously planned May 20 to April 22 due to fan complaints. Stone said to Entertainment Weekly in response to the fan backlash, "If you get that pissed off because you don't know who a little construction paper kid's father is, then there's really something wrong with you." Allan Johnson of the Chicago Tribune said Comedy Central was "punking out" with the decision.

Several reviewers noted a significant amount of crude and vulgar humor in "Terrance and Philip in Not Without My Anus", even by South Park standards; The Sydney Morning Herald noted the episode contained 29 separate fart jokes in the span of 22 minutes. Global Television Network in Canada reported no complaints about the episode in the weeks after its release.

== Reception ==
Reviewers were mixed on Parker and Stone's elaborate April Fools' Day prank. Diane Werts of Newsday said of the episode, "Fans rioted. Some jumped ship and never came back. The lesson: Pay off our expectations, or you'll be sorry." Jim Minge of the Omaha World-Herald said South Park fans were "duped" by the episode. Philip Martin of the Arkansas Democrat-Gazette, who said in May 1998 the South Park phenomenon was "dead", described the April Fools' prank as "lamentable" and part of the reason for the show's apparent decline. Others, however, praised Parker and Stone for making the move at the risk of upsetting fans. Tim Clodfelter of the Winston-Salem Journal said, "It was a funny, clever move [that] quickly separated the fans who truly 'got' [Parker and Stone's] humor from those who were just watching for the dirty jokes." Jon Casimir of The Sydney Morning Herald said, "It is gratifying, in an entertainment world dominated by market research and common denominators, to see a program that obviously doesn't care if you like it or not." However, he said the characterization of Terrance and Phillip was too thin to be particularly funny and added that the novelty of the prank is lost in later years.

Jakob Von Bayer said the episode continued a long history of South Park Canada-bashing: "South Park has gotten a lot of comic mileage out of Canada over the years. [...] This episode portrays a country full of Bob and Doug McKenzies; Toronto is but a highway town en route to Buffalo." "Terrance and Phillip in Not Without My Anus" was among the episodes featured in a 2006 list by the Winnipeg Free Press of the ten most memorable South Park episodes. The Toronto Sun listed the episode as one of the most memorable television moments of 1998, and the single most memorable moment from the month of April. The prank played by the airing of this episode was revisited a number of times in subsequent episodes. The episode "Cartoon Wars Part II" revisits it by appearing to begin with a similar spoof, though the episode then cuts to the actual plot. The fifth season episode, "Terrance and Phillip: Behind the Blow", also references the controversy over the airing of this episode, as does the thirteenth season episode, "Eat, Pray, Queef".

=== Home media ===
"Terrance and Phillip in Not Without My Anus" was released on VHS on June 15, 1999, as a stand-alone episode. It was also released on DVD, along with the rest of season two, in June 2003.
