= List of Silver Spoons episodes =

Silver Spoons is an American sitcom that aired for four seasons on NBC from September 25, 1982 to May 11, 1986, and an additional fifth season in first-run syndication from September 27, 1986 to May 30, 1987. A total of 116 episodes were produced over the five seasons.

== Series overview ==
Season	Episodes	Originally released		
Season	Episodes	First released	Last released	Network
1	22	September 25, 1982	April 30, 1983	NBC
2	22	October 15, 1983	April 7, 1984	NBC
3	24	September 16, 1984	April 7, 1985	NBC
4	24	September 15, 1985	May 11, 1986	NBC
5	24	September 27, 1986	May 30, 1987	Syndicated

== Episodes ==
=== Season 1 (1982–83) ===
No. overall	No. in season	Title	Directed by	Written by	Original release date
1	1	"Pilot"	Bob Lally	Story by : David W. Duclon & Ron Leavitt & Michael G. Moye & Howard Leeds & Ben Starr & Martin Cohan; Teleplay by : David W. Duclon & Ron Leavitt & Michael G. Moye	September 25, 1982
The wealthy Edward Stratton III (Joel Higgins) has a big surprise: Ricky (Ricky Schroder), the 12-year-old son he's never known.
2	2	"Boys Will Be Boys"	Jack Shea	Robert Illes & James Stein	October 2, 1982
After Edward decides not to punish Ricky for misbehaving, Derek (Jason Bateman) convinces Ricky that Edward doesn't love him.
3	3	"Grandfather Stratton"	Jack Shea	Steve Pritzker	October 9, 1982
Ricky tries to reconcile his father with his grandfather (John Houseman), who haven't spoken to each other in years.
4	4	"Me & Mr. T"	Jack Shea	David W. Duclon & Ron Leavitt & Michael G. Moye	October 16, 1982
When a bully beats up Ricky at school, Edward hires Mr. T as a bodyguard to defend him.
5	5	"Takin' a Chance on Love"	Jack Shea	Steve Pritzker	October 23, 1982
Ricky seeks advice on dating from Edward when he falls for Sally (Amanda Peterson), the new girl at school.
6	6	"Evelyn Returns"	Jack Shea	Lee H. Grant & Danny Kallis	October 30, 1982
Evelyn (Christine Belford), Edward's ex-wife and Ricky's mother, arrives to take Ricky back with her to the United Kingdom.
7	7	"The Great Computer Caper"	Jack Shea	Danny Kallis	November 6, 1982
Ricky shows off his computer skills to Diff'rent Strokes character Arnold Jackson (Gary Coleman) by gaining access to top-secret military intelligence data.
8	8	"I'm Just Wild About Harry"	Jack Shea	Steve Pritzker	November 13, 1982
Ricky wants to keep an orangutan that he and Derek found.
9	9	"Honor Thy Father"	Jack Shea	Glenn Padnick	November 20, 1982
Edward refuses to appear at a dinner honoring his father, so Ricky fills in for him.
10	10	"Father Nature"	Jack Shea	Michael G. Moye	November 27, 1982
Ricky convinces his dad to take him camping so that he can earn a merit badge, but things go wrong on the trip.
11	11	"A Little Magic"	Jack Shea	Neil Lebowitz	December 4, 1982
Derek convinces Ricky that Edward's secretary Kate (Erin Gray) is in love with him (Ricky), causing Ricky to set Kate up with Edward instead. Continues on " Falling In Love Again".
12	12	"Falling in Love Again"	Jack Shea	Lee H. Grant	December 11, 1982
Ricky continues to play matchmaker between Kate and Edward, eventually causing them to publicly declare their love for each other.
13	13	"The Best Christmas Ever"	Jack Shea	Story by : Robert Illes & James Stein; Teleplay by : Steve Pritzker	December 18, 1982
Ricky and Edward bring the spirit of Christmas to a family forced to live in a cave on their property.
14	14	"The Most Beautiful Girl in the World"	Jack Shea	Robert Illes & James Stein	January 8, 1983
After Derek saves Ricky's life, Ricky's repayment offer finds him posing as Derek's party date. Notes: This was the first appearance of Bobby Fite as J.T. Martin and Corky Pigeon as Freddy Lippincottleman.
15	15	"Twelve Angry Kids"	Jack Shea	David W. Duclon	January 15, 1983
When Ricky stands up to a bully, he finds himself in court being sued for damages. Notes This was the last appearance of Leonard Lightfoot as Leonard Rollins, Edward's lawyer and best friend.
16	16	"The Toy Wonder"	Jack Shea	Jeff Reno & Ron Osborn	January 22, 1983
Edward tries to attract a 12-year-old female toy wiz to work for him, but she will only do it if Ricky will be her boyfriend.
17	17	"Popcorn"	Jack Shea	Story by : Jack Shea; Teleplay by : Neil Lebowitz	February 5, 1983
Ricky solicits a cash donation from Edward to help fund a school field trip only to have to raise the money himself.
18	18	"Junior Businessman"	Jack Shea	Danny Kallis and Lee H. Grant	February 12, 1983
Edward lets Ricky run his own restaurant to test his skills at managing a business. Notes: This was the first appearance of Franklyn Seales as Dexter Stuffins.
19	19	"Three's a Crowd"	Jack Shea	Garry Ferrier & Aubrey Tadman	February 19, 1983
Ricky feels neglected when Kate unexpectedly appears during a ski trip with his father.
20	20	"The Empire Strikes Out"	Jack Shea	Steve Pritzker	February 26, 1983
When Edward's father tries to send Kate away, the two men butt heads.
21	21	"Won't You Go Home, Bob Danish?"	Jack Shea	Story by : Steve Pritzker; Teleplay by : Robert Illes & James Stein	March 5, 1983
Kate's old boyfriend crashes his plane on the Stratton estate, causing problems for Edward.
22	22	"The X-Team"	Jack Shea	Story by : David W. Duclon; Teleplay by : Robert Illes & James Stein	April 30, 1983
Kate catches Ricky and his friends watching an X-rated film on TV.

=== Season 2 (1983–84) ===
No. overall	No. in season	Title	Directed by	Written by	Original release date
23	1	"Passports to Pleasure"	Jack Shea	David W. Duclon	October 15, 1983
While in Chicago, Ricky and Derek try to get two women to accompany them to a Duran Duran concert.
24	2	"Attack of the Giant Frog People"	Jack Shea	Steve Pritzker	October 22, 1983
Ricky feels guilty after he joins Derek and J.T. in putting down Freddy.
25	3	"A Fair to Remember"	Jack Shea	Robert Illes & James Stein	October 29, 1983
After Ricky butts heads with his science teacher, he comes up with a winning science-fair project to regain the teacher's respect.
26	4	"The Hospital"	Jack Shea	Jim Geoghan	November 12, 1983
Edward has a gallstone attack that lands him in the hospital, much to Ricky and Kate's concern. Notes: This is the first appearance of Leslie Crambottom, played by Georgi Irene.
27	5	"Mr. President"	Jack Shea	David W. Duclon and Robert Illes & James Stein	November 19, 1983
Faced with a dilemma as school class president, Ricky daydreams that he is President of the United States.
28	6	"Drivers' Ed"	Jack Shea	Danny Kallis	November 26, 1983
Ricky asks his grandfather to teach him to drive while Edward and Kate are out of town.
29	7	"Menudo Madness"	Jack Shea	Robert Illes & James Stein	December 3, 1983
To impress a girl, Ricky promises her that Menudo will be at his party.
30	8	"Happy Birthday"	Jack Shea	Steve Pritzker	December 10, 1983
Ricky's birthday wish is for Kate, his dad and his grandfather to get along.
31	9	"Sounds of Silence"	Jack Shea	Danny Kallis	December 17, 1983
Ricky's performance in the school orchestra concert turns out to be a disaster.
32	10	"Rick the Greek"	Jack Shea	Neil Lebowitz	January 7, 1984
Ricky gets involved with sports betting and must secretly sell a valuable coin to pay his debt.
33	11	"Uneasy Rider"	Jack Shea	Lee H. Grant	January 14, 1984
After Edward tells Ricky that he can't have a motorcycle, Ricky cons his mom into buying one for him.
34	12	"World's Greatest Father"	Jack Shea	Glenn Padnick	January 21, 1984
Ricky's friend J.T.'s father is upset after J.T. agrees that Edward is the world's greatest father. Notes: This is the final appearance of Bobby Fite.
35	13	"I Want to Be Alone"	Jack Shea	Story by : Jack Shea; Teleplay by : Robert Illes & James Stein	January 28, 1984
Ricky invites Dexter to a relaxing family retreat in a cabin in the woods, but Dexter ends up being anything but relaxed.
36	14	"Mr. Cool"	Jack Shea	Story by : Michael Hallauer & Randy Wilson; Teleplay by : Robert Illes & James Stein	February 4, 1984
Ricky and Freddy change their looks to impress some girls.
37	15	"St. Louis Blues"	Jack Shea	Steve Pritzker	February 11, 1984
Derek learns that his parents are getting a divorce and his mom is moving to St. Louis. Notes:This was the final appearance of Jason Bateman.
38	16	"A Hunting We Will Go"	Jack Shea	David W. Duclon	February 18, 1984
Ricky is gun-shy on his first hunting trip.
39	17	"Changes"	Jack Shea	Neil Lebowitz	March 3, 1984
Ricky thinks that Billie (Sydney Penny), the tomboyish pitcher on his baseball team, has a crush on him.
40	18	"A Summer's Romance: Part 1"	Jack Shea	David W. Duclon	March 10, 1984
Ricky's classmate Leslie's mother is an old flame from Edward's past, causing problems with Kate.
41	19	"A Summer's Romance: Part 2"	Jack Shea	David W. Duclon	March 17, 1984
Edward must choose between Leslie's mother Veronica and Kate when he is caught kissing Veronica.
42	20	"Spare the Rod"	Jack Shea	Story by : Barry O'Brien and Cheryl Alu; Teleplay by : Steve Pritzker	March 24, 1984
Ricky discovers that his seemingly accident-prone friend Toby (Meeno Peluce) is actually a victim of child abuse.
43	21	"Blazing Hotel Rooms"	Jack Shea	Robert Illes & James Stein and Steve Pritzker	March 31, 1984
While in Miami for a toy convention, Dexter, Edward and Ricky are trapped in their hotel room during a fire.
44	22	"Hi, Mom"	Jack Shea	Deborah J. Duclon & David W. Duclon	April 7, 1984
Kate tries to keep her relationship with Edward a secret from her mother Marjorie (Georgann Johnson).

=== Season 3 (1984–85) ===
No. overall	No. in season	Title	Directed by	Written by	Original release date
45	1	"Best Friends"	Jack Shea	Robert Illes & James Stein	September 16, 1984
Dexter introduces Ricky to Alfonso (Alfonso Ribeiro), his nephew. Alfonso, in turn, tries to fit in with Ricky's crowd by saying he knows Michael Jackson.
46	2	"Survival of the Fittest"	Jack Shea	Jim Geoghan	September 23, 1984
After being top dog at junior high, Ricky has a hard time adjusting to being a freshman in high school, especially after he is hazed by the upperclassmen.
47	3	"Growing Pains: Part 1"	Jack Shea	Neil Lebowitz	September 30, 1984
When Rick stays out past his curfew one time too many, Edward grounds him, causing him to run away from home.: Recording date: August 24, 1984
48	4	"Growing Pains: Part 2"	Jack Shea	Danny Kallis and Jim Geoghan	October 7, 1984
After spending the night at a run-down hotel, Rick returns home and is torn between going out with his friends and obeying his dad.: Recording date: August 31, 1984
49	5	"A Dark and Stormy Night"	Jack Shea	Steve Pritzker	October 28, 1984
When a lightning storm knocks out the power to the Stratton mansion, Ricky, his dad and his friends keep themselves entertained by telling a round-robin ghost story.
50	6	"I Won't Dance"	Jack Shea	Steve Pritzker	November 4, 1984
Ricky tries to set up his grandfather with his teacher (Barbara Billingsley), but they discover that they're better off as just friends.
51	7	"Voyage of the Darned: Part 1"	Jack Shea	Robert Illes & James Stein	November 11, 1984
Ricky and Alfonso make plans to go to a Thanksgiving party but are less than thrilled when Edward, Kate and Dexter decide to take them on a last-minute trip to the Caribbean instead in the company plane, with Kate piloting.
52	8	"Voyage of the Darned: Part 2"	Jack Shea	Steve Pritzker	November 18, 1984
After Kate makes an emergency landing while piloting the plane through the Bermuda Triangle, everyone spends Thanksgiving stranded on a Caribbean island.
53	9	"The Call of the Wild"	Jack Shea	George Tibbles	November 25, 1984
Ricky's mom and Edward's ex-wife Evelyn arrives with her fiance, Elmer (John Matuszak), and plans to move next door to the Strattons.
54	10	"Beauties and the Beasts"	Jack Shea	Robert Illes & James Stein	December 9, 1984
Ricky, Freddy and Alfonso become judges for a beauty pageant at school only to discover the entrants trying to butter them up to win. Meanwhile, Edward enlists Kate's help to resolve a labor dispute. Tracy Wells, who would later be famous for starring on Mr. Belvedere makes her television debut in this episode.
55	11	"'Twas the Night Before Christmas"	Jack Shea	Robert Illes & James Stein	December 16, 1984
Edward invites Freddy's family to spend Christmas Eve at the Stratton mansion after their house burns down. Meanwhile, Alfonso becomes depressed upon learning that his mom won't be able to spend Christmas with him.
56	12	"Lulu's Back in Town"	Jack Shea	Robert Illes & James Stein	December 30, 1984
When Max (Bill Quinn), who runs Rick and Alfonso's favorite hangout, decides to retire and sell the restaurant, Rick tries to get Lulu Baker (Pearl Bailey), a family friend and retired restaurateur, to take over.
57	13	"The Trouble with Grandfather"	Jack Shea	Jim Evering & Dorothy Van	January 6, 1985
Grandfather Stratton decides to cut loose and enjoy life a little after his longtime rival passes away.
58	14	"Special Friend"	Jack Shea	Story by : Jim Evering & Dorothy Van; Teleplay by : Jill Gordon	January 13, 1985
When Rick becomes a peer counselor at school, he thinks he can handle anyone needing help until he meets a junior high student who has serious attitude and academic problems.
59	15	"What's Cookin'?"	Jack Shea	Steve Pritzker	January 27, 1985
Rick suggests a promotion for his grandfather's company, Stratton Flour Mills, and is hired by his grandfather. However, when he doesn't complete a task, Grandfather quickly fires him, causing friction in the family. Lulu (Pearl Bailey) steps in to keep the peace.
60	16	"Marry Me, Marry Me: Part 1"	Jack Shea	Jim Geoghan & Danny Kallis	February 3, 1985
Edward proposes to Kate after she turns down a lucrative job offer because of their relationship. Rick, however, becomes upset upon learning that his dad didn't ask him first, and Kate decides to take some time alone to think the engagement over.
61	17	"Marry Me, Marry Me: Part 2"	Jack Shea	Danny Kallis and Jim Geoghan	February 10, 1985
After thinking things over, Kate decides to marry Edward.
62	18	"Rick and the Legend"	Jack Shea	Steve Pritzker	February 17, 1985
Rick discovers that an obnoxious 16-year-old named Lege (short for "Legend") that he's been hanging out with is merely taking advantage of him.
63	19	"Trouble with Words"	Jack Shea	Story by : Marvin Himelfarb; Teleplay by : Robert Illes & James Stein	February 24, 1985
Alfonso becomes frustrated and upset with his performance in school until Bruce Jenner, who is visiting the Stratton mansion, suggests that the problem may be due to dyslexia.
64	20	"Hot Shot"	Jack Shea	Story by : Alan L. Gansberg; Teleplay by : Steve Pritzker	March 3, 1985
Rick seeks help from consumer advocate David Horowitz when he becomes the victim of fraud.
65	21	"All the Principal's Men"	Jack Shea	Story by : Garry Ferrier & Aubrey Tadman; Teleplay by : Danny Kallis & Jim Geoghan	March 10, 1985
When Rick reports on his school's cable news show that the cafeteria is serving horse meat, he has to decide between being suspended or revealing his source.
66	22	"Return of the Paisley Conspiracy"	Jack Shea	Milt Rosen & Glenn Padnick	March 17, 1985
Rick surprises his dad for his 40th birthday with a reunion of his college singer partner, which prompts Edward to take the old act on the road again.
67	23	"The Secret Life of Ricky Stratton"	Tony Singletary	Story by : Ron Kidd; Teleplay by : Danny Kallis	March 24, 1985
Ricky, as "The Ricker," agrees to meet a girl (guest star Katie Barberi) he's been corresponding with on the computer in person, but becomes self-conscious after seeing her photo.
68	24	"The Babysitters"	Marlena Laird	Robert Illes & James Stein and Steve Pritzker	April 7, 1985
Ricky suspects a six-year-old girl he is babysitting may have been abducted by her father.

=== Season 4 (1985–86) ===
No. overall	No. in season	Title	Directed by	Written by	Original release date
69	1	"Head Over Heels"	Jack Shea	Marshall Goldberg & Jim Geoghan	September 15, 1985
When Whitney Houston pays a visit to the Stratton mansion, Dexter is smitten and plans to move to Los Angeles to be with her, much to Alfonso's dismay.
70	2	"Mrs. Stratton Builds Her Dreamhouse"	Jack Shea	Steve Pritzker	September 22, 1985
Edward gives Kate permission to redesign the Stratton mansion, but he and Rick regret that decision once Kate guts the house.
71	3	"Poor Evelyn"	Jack Shea	Steve Pritzker	October 6, 1985
Rick convinces his dad to hire his mom, Evelyn, after Evelyn announces she's broke.
72	4	"Promises, Promises"	Jack Shea	Ken Cinnamon & Karen Wengrod	October 13, 1985
Rick agonizes about whether or not to get a promise ring for a girl he's dating.
73	5	"The Great Baseball Card Scheme"	Jack Shea	Marshall Goldberg	October 27, 1985
Grandfather Stratton shows Rick how to make a fortune with baseball cards by starting a rumor that Tommy Lasorda will be inducted into the Baseball Hall of Fame and buying up all the Lasorda cards, thus making the card valuable.
74	6	"The Trouble with Uncle Harry"	Jack Shea	Ron Clark	November 3, 1985
Kate's Uncle Harry (Ray Walston) convinces a reluctant Rick to let him use the Stratton mansion to impress an old Army buddy.
75	7	"One Strike and You're Out"	Jack Shea	Jim Mulligan	November 10, 1985
Rick tries to settle a labor dispute between his friends and his grandfather regarding minimum wage being paid at his restaurant. First appearance of Brad Langford (Billy Jayne).
76	8	"Race with Eagles"	Jack Shea	Linwood Boomer	November 17, 1985
Edward has to run up the steps of the Empire State Building in order to help a fund-raiser.
77	9	"A Magnificent Obsession"	Jack Shea	Ken Cinnamon & Karen Wengrod	November 24, 1985
Rick attempts to win back his girlfriend, who's left him for the captain of the football team.
78	10	"Judgment Day"	Jack Shea	Danny Kallis	December 1, 1985
Not wanting Rick to make the same mistakes he made, Edward pressures him to improve his grades and get into a good college. The pressure appears to be a little too much, though, as Rick goes nuts desperately trying to please his dad.
79	11	"The Barbarians"	Jack Shea	Danny Kallis & Jim Geoghan	December 8, 1985
Grandfather Stratton invites Rick and Edward to join him at a lodge, then shows a bit of his wild side when he plots revenge after he falls victim to a prank from one of his lodge mates.
80	12	"Three Musketeers"	Jack Shea	Story by : Nick Gore & Jerry Jacobius; Teleplay by : Tom Straw	December 15, 1985
Freddy writes a letter that gets the attention of Congressman Tip O'Neill.
81	13	"Second Class Parent"	Jack Shea	Danny Kallis	December 21, 1985
While Edward is away, Kate allows Rick to spend winter vacation with his friends at Fort Lauderdale.
82	14	"The Lady Is A Tramp"	Jack Shea	Steve Pepoon	January 5, 1986
A bag lady Rick invites to dinner makes an impression on one of Edward's key clients.
83	15	"Stratton and Stratton"	Jack Shea	Jim Geoghan	January 12, 1986
Rick refuses to take his father's advice on marketing the board game he invented.
84	16	"Daddy Rick"	Jack Shea	Jim Geoghan	January 19, 1986
Rick's "wife" in a mock marriage for school tells him she's actually pregnant.
85	17	"One for the Road: Part 1"	Jack Shea	Jack Humphrey	February 2, 1986
Rick's friend Greg convinces him to sneak out to a wild party. They come back the next morning, and even though Rick has his first hangover the boys are able to keep Edward and Kate in the dark. However, Rick and his friends are not so lucky when they go out to drink again the next night.
86	18	"One for the Road: Part 2"	Jack Shea	Story by : Stephen Langford & Hendrik Van Leuven; Teleplay by : Linwood Boomer	February 9, 1986
Edward grounds Rick for experimenting with alcohol, but Greg continues to have a drinking problem.
87	19	"Movie Madness"	Jack Shea	Danny Kallis	February 16, 1986
Rick is determined to win the annual student filmmaking contest.
88	20	"Rick Sings"	Jack Shea	Jim Geoghan	February 23, 1986
Rick becomes the manager of his friends' band, but is forced to fill in when the lead singer comes down with laryngitis.
89	21	"The Way We Weren't"	Jack Shea	Marshall Goldberg	March 2, 1986
Rick lands a job as a DJ at a local radio station. Meanwhile, Edward's ex-wife Evelyn shows up just as Kate is leaving on a business trip, causing Edward to call Rick at the station in a panic.
90	22	"A Family Affair"	Jack Shea	Danny Kallis and Linwood Boomer	March 16, 1986
Rick dates a girl whose father purportedly has ties to the mob.
91	23	"Rick at 16"	Jack Shea	Jim Geoghan	May 4, 1986
Rick tries to juggle two girls he invited to his 16th birthday party -- one he wanted to invite, the other he inadvertently invited.
92	24	"Second Best"	Jack Shea	Bob Baublitz	May 11, 1986
Rick is tired of his girlfriend Holly being better at everything than he is.

=== Season 5 (1986–87) ===
No. overall	No. in season	Title	Directed by	Written by	Original release date
93	1	"Who's the Boss?"	Jack Shea	Danny Kallis and Jim Geoghan	September 27, 1986
Kate's success as toy-company head makes Edward jealous.
94	2	"Lost and Found"	Jack Shea	Marshall Goldberg and Linwood Boomer	October 4, 1986
Kate's grandmother Mildred (Billie Bird), who's trying to maintain her independence in spite of her failing memory, visits the Strattons.
95	3	"The Live-In"	Jack Shea	Story by : Linwood Boomer; Teleplay by : Jim Parker	October 11, 1986
The Strattons hire a pretty housekeeper named Ingrid (Lena Pousette), who thinks Edward is speaking of himself when he tries to tell her that Rick has a crush on her.
96	4	"Rick Sells His Sole"	Bob Lally	Danny Kallis	October 18, 1986
When the nephew of a shoe-store owner gets promoted ahead of Rick, he resorts to sabotage.
97	5	"The Beach House"	Bob Lally	Jim Geoghan	October 25, 1986
While on vacation, Rick's resolve to stay true with his girlfriend turns to sand when he meets the beach bunny next door.
98	6	"Rick Moves Out"	Steven Robman	George Tricker & Neil Rosen	November 1, 1986
Rick moves into the guest house to get some privacy, only for friends and strangers to make it their home away from home.
99	7	"Man to Man"	Tony Singletary	Linwood Boomer	November 8, 1986
Edward's birthday is nothing to celebrate after Rick beats him at tennis for the first time.
100	8	"Hey, Mrs. Robinson"	Zane Buzby	Bob Baublitz	November 15, 1986
Kate's attractive college friend Jackie comes to visit but after she takes a strong interest in Rick, Edward and Kate become concerned.
101	9	"Rick's Learning Problem"	Art Dielhenn	Melissa Clark	November 22, 1986
Rick must help the star football player pass a history test in order to play for the championship. Ryan Lambert guest stars.
102	10	"The Triangle"	John Sguelglia	Ed Burnham & Elaine Newman	November 29, 1986
Rick reluctantly agrees to take Brad's girlfriend Leslie to a rock concert when Brad gets grounded. He then finds his friendship with Brad getting strained after Leslie dumps Brad for him.
103	11	"Kate Lassos a Longhorn"	Art Dielhenn	George Tricker & Neil Rosen	December 6, 1986
Kate gets close to landing a big business deal with a Texas businessman, only to find out that he's a sexist.
104	12	"Edward Creates a Monster"	John Sgueglia	Jim Geoghan	January 31, 1987
Rick's homework for a comedy class gets him in trouble with Edward and Kate.
105	13	"Rumors Are Flying"	Tony Singletary	Danny Kallis	February 7, 1987
Rick tutors the hottest girl in school in chemistry, & inadvertently starts a rumor about them having had sex-which proves awkward & difficult to quash-when they fall asleep on the bed while studying the night before.
106	14	"The House Guest"	Tony Singletary	Bob Baublitz	February 14, 1987
Rick's friend Brad becomes the Strattons' house guest -- with disastrous results.
107	15	"Band on the Run"	Art Dielhenn	George Tricker & Neil Rosen	February 21, 1987
Alfonso quits Rick's band when they won't listen to his girlfriend's (guest star Martika) ideas.
108	16	"Author, Author"	Art Dielhenn	Denis Markell & Douglas Bernstein	February 28, 1987
Edward discovers that a character in his ex-wife's novel bears a strong resemblance to him.
109	17	"Mother's Day"	Phil Squyres	Racelle Friedman	March 14, 1987
Kate feels that she can't compare to Rick's real mother.
110	18	"Hero Worship"	Judi Elterman	Story by : Ron Wullner; Teleplay by : Stephen Langford	April 18, 1987
Rick admires his new neighbor -- a rookie basketball star who gets suspended for possessing drugs.
111	19	"Baby Blues"	Tony Singletary	Jim Geoghan and Danny Kallis	April 25, 1987
Rick sets a single mother up with a contractor.
112	20	"Thoroughly Modern Mildred"	Luis Soto and John Sgueglia	Lisa Medway	May 2, 1987
Kate's grandmother surprises everyone with her new boyfriend.
113	21	"Pardon My French"	Jack Shea	Ron Clark	May 9, 1987
Grandfather Stratton returns from his visit to Paris along with his fiancee (guest star Line Renaud).
114	22	"Educating Rick"	Joel Higgins and John Sgueglia	George Tricker & Neil Rosen	May 16, 1987
Rick and Brad have more fun than they're permitted when they attend an open-house weekend at an all-male college.
115	23	"Edward's Big Adventure"	John Sgueglia	Jim Geoghan & Danny Kallis	May 23, 1987
Edward loses his wallet as a pool shark hustles him.
116	24	"Let It Snow, Let It Snow"	John Sgueglia	Danny Kallis & Jim Geoghan	May 30, 1987
Edward and Kate have trouble getting time alone on their ski trip.
