= Pinkeye (South Park) =

- South Park episode
- Episode no.: Season 1 Episode 7
- Directed by: Trey Parker; Matt Stone
- Written by: Trey Parker; Matt Stone; Philip Stark
- Production code: 107
- Original air date: October 29, 1997

Episode chronology
| ← Previous "Death" | Next → "Starvin' Marvin" |
- South Park season 1

"Pinkeye" is the seventh episode of the first season of the American animated television series South Park. It first aired on Comedy Central in the United States on October 29, 1997. In the episode, Kenny is killed and brought back to life as a zombie through a freak accident, terrorizing South Park residents who believe that the rise of the living dead is an epidemic of "pinkeye".

The episode was written by series creators Trey Parker and Matt Stone along with Philip Stark, and was the first of a new slate of episodes Parker and Stone made after Comedy Central agreed to pick up the show full-time. The duo was not happy with the episode, particularly the ending, and were surprised by the positive response it received from fans. Parker said he also wanted the episode to convey in part that Halloween is a positive holiday for children and adults.

"Pinkeye" received generally positive reviews, and has been described as one of the classic episodes of South Park. It was viewed in 1.75 million households when it first aired, an unusually high amount for Comedy Central at the time. The episode introduced the recurring character Principal Victoria. When Cartman dresses as Adolf Hitler, Victoria removes Cartman's costume and attempts to dress him as a ghost, but inadvertently makes Cartman resemble a member of the Ku Klux Klan. This initially worried Comedy Central executives, but the negative feedback received was minimal.

== Plot ==
The boys are waiting for the school bus as usual when the Mir Space Station crashes and kills Kenny whose body is then taken to the local morgue. One of the men at the morgue accidentally leaves a bottle of Worcestershire sauce open and its contents mix with the embalming fluid, turning Kenny into a zombie. Kenny bites the two men and leaves in the middle of the night.

The next day Kenny rejoins his friends, who are dressed up for a Halloween costume contest. Stan is dressed as Raggedy Andy (since Wendy would be going as Raggedy Ann, thus making a pair), Kyle wears a Chewbacca mask, and Cartman is dressed as Adolf Hitler, much to the annoyance of Kyle, who is Jewish. A zombified Kenny then joins the boys, but they fail to notice that he actually is a zombie.

At school, Kyle becomes more annoyed after discovering that all the other students (as well as Mr. Hat) are also dressed as Chewbacca, while Mr. Garrison is dressed as Marilyn Monroe. Worst of all, Wendy is also dressed as Chewbacca, to which she explains that she changed costumes because she would have looked stupid as Raggedy Ann, and she figured that Stan would realize the same way about dressing up as Raggedy Andy. A stubborn Kyle then decides to make a new costume so he can win the prize, which is two tons of candy.

Both Chef (dressed as Evel Knievel) and Principal Victoria are offended to see Cartman dressed as Hitler, to which Principal Victoria decides to make him a "spooky ghost" costume to replace his Hitler costume, but the costume resembles a Ku Klux Klan outfit, which frightens Chef. At the costume contest, which is judged by Tina Yothers, Kyle is able to dress up as the Solar System for his new costume, hoping to win the prize.

Kenny is able to win second place for his zombie costume (despite it not being a costume at all), and Wendy is able to win first place as well as the two tons of candy (despite wearing the same costume as several other students), much to Kyle's anger at Tina Yothers. Stan ends up winning the "Worst Costume" category and everyone laughs at him, leaving him humiliated and upset with Wendy. A zombified Clyde drowns Bebe while bobbing for apples.

Meanwhile, thanks to Kenny, the mortician and his assistant are mistakenly diagnosed to have "pinkeye", but they become zombies and go around biting other people, turning them into zombies as well. Back home, Chef, who sees the outbreak on TV, tries to warn both the doctor and Mayor McDaniels (who is having sex with Officer Barbrady), but his pleas are ignored.

The boys assemble to trick-or-treat, with Kyle now dressed as a vampire. Wendy offers to join them, but Stan angrily refuses and even spitefully tells her "I wish you were dead!" and storms off with the others, unknowingly leaving Wendy behind to be bitten by a zombie. As the boys trick-or-treat, they are not able to notice the outbreak, even when Kenny is able to bite every person they meet when going door to door, to which they decide to abandon him afterwards. They arrive at Chef's home, to which Chef arms himself with a pair of chainsaws before noticing the boys and letting them inside. Chef then tells them what is really going on before taking them to the morgue to stop the outbreak.

After discovering the hotline number on the Worcestershire sauce bottle, the boys and Chef are chased by the zombies (which includes a zombified Pip, whom Cartman refers to as a "limey zombie"), and Chef ends up becoming a zombie himself while dressed up as Michael Jackson and performing his own version of "Thriller" with the other zombies dancing along with him. Kyle is then able to call the Worcestershire sauce hotline number on the phone while Stan and Cartman are able to defend themselves with chainsaws, which they use to kill the zombies, but Stan hesitates to kill a zombified Wendy upon encountering her.

After Kyle learns he has to kill the original zombie (after being told complicatedly by the hotline lady), he discovers that Kenny is the original zombie after remembering that he was the one who was taken to the morgue, and he then kills Kenny by slicing him in half with a chainsaw (to which he then utters out "Oh, my God! I killed Kenny!"). The zombie disease is broken, and all the zombies turn back to normal (despite having been dismembered with chainsaws). Stan makes up with Wendy and they are about to kiss each other, but he ends up puking on her.

The episode ends with the boys mourning at Kenny's grave, and they immediately decide to go home to eat their Halloween candy as well as look at photos of Cartman's mom, who is on the cover of a porn magazine, much to the annoyance of Cartman throughout much of the episode, claiming that she was young and needed the money; Stan then tells him that the photos were taken a month ago, infuriating Cartman even more.

As soon as the boys leave, Kenny comes back to life and emerges from the grave with his body sewn together, but an angel statue falls onto him, followed by an airline jet crashing into him, killing him once more.

== Production ==
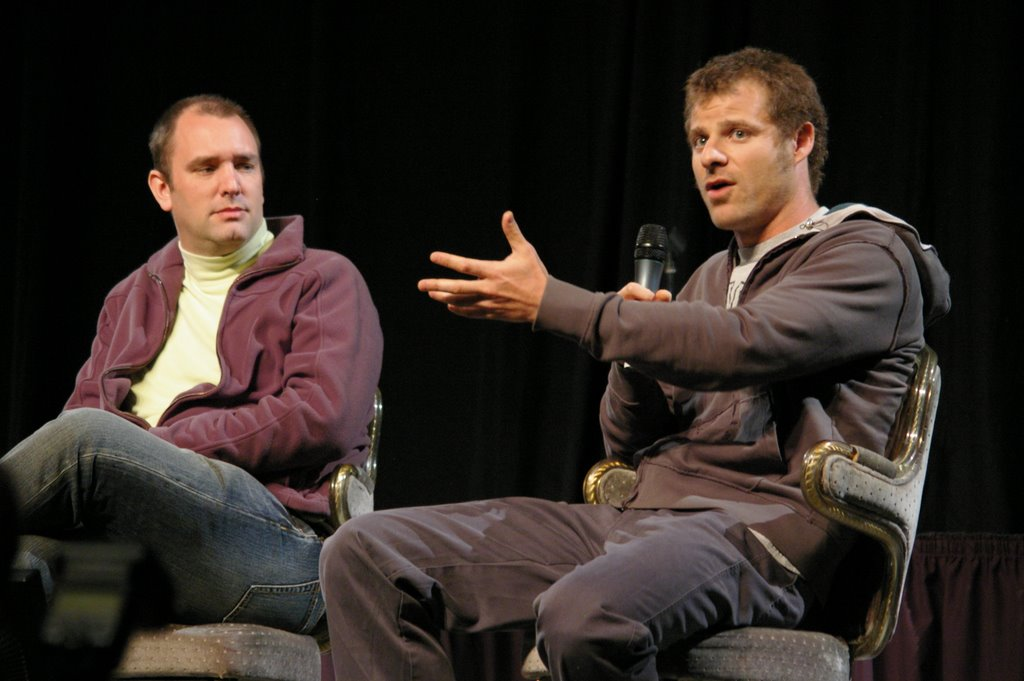
South Park co-creators Trey Parker and Matt Stone co-wrote and directed "Pinkeye"

Comedy Central originally ordered only six episodes of South Park for the first season's initial run. However, when the show proved to be a success, they requested an additional seven, the first ones of which creators Trey Parker and Matt Stone had to produce quickly. "Pinkeye" was the first of those new seven episodes to be produced. It was also the first South Park Halloween episode. The script was written by Parker, Stone and writer Philip Stark, and was directed by Parker and Stone, who made the pinkeye a major element of the plot because they associate the illness with the elementary school experience. Parker said, "Pinkeye is just such a huge part of your life when you're in third grade. Pinkeye is the thing every third grader gets and it's just such a bizarre thing." In writing the episode, Parker said he wanted to convey his belief that Halloween is a positive holiday, especially for children, "Halloween's a great thing. That was part of what we wanted (to say). I think kids having this kind of mythology is great." Originally they planned to use Diet Dr Pepper instead of Worcestershire sauce, but they could not get permission to use the Dr Pepper name.

"Pinkeye" was the first South Park episode to feature a cold open, or an opening scene jumping right into the story before the opening credits are shown. In all previous episodes, and the majority of those following it, the episode starts after the opening credits and follows a three-act model, more in the style of a short film than a traditional television episode. "Pinkeye" was the first episode in which Kenny's death was a key element of the episode and a catalyst of the plot, rather than a throwaway gag. It was also the first time Kenny died multiple times: once in the beginning, once as a zombie and once at the end when he is resurrected a second time. The blood featured in the episode was deliberately designed to look primitive as a reference to The Spirit of Christmas, the 1995 animated short film by Parker and Stone that served as a precursor to South Park, in which the blood was drawn with a Sharpie marker. For the final scene when Kenny comes back to life a second time, the dramatic music was inserted at the last moment by Parker with a synthesizer.

Parker and Stone had trouble deciding how to resolve the episode and bring the zombie characters back to life. Although they ultimately settled on having Kyle kill the "main zombie" to bring back the others, Parker did not feel the resolution made sense and described it as a deus ex machina. Parker said of the ending, "This was another big one of those episodes where we were sort of (like), 'How do we get out of this one?'" Parker also described the ending of the episode as "a bloodbath, (which) is what a good zombie movie should be". "Pinkeye" was the first South Park episode Parker and Stone felt unsatisfied with once production was complete. Parker said, "We were pretty bummed out, and we kind of thought, well, we're going to have a bad episode go on the air, and hopefully it won't alienate too many people, and we'll try to get our viewers back for Thanksgiving. But we were totally wrong, people totally loved it."

Stone said he felt the episode solidified major characteristics embodied by the Chef character, particularly the fact that he is one of the only adults in South Park who always understands the truth of any given situation and believes the children almost all of the time. Stone said, "It's like the parents are all nuts that live in the town. The boys are kind of the most sane and Chef is really the only one in town who believes the kids when they say (something) is happening, when the kids are actually right and it's the town that's crazy." "Pinkeye" was also the first episode in which Eric Cartman's mother Liane was portrayed as a promiscuous woman who previously engaged in drugs and prostitution, and is willing to engage in pornographic sex for money; during the episode, she is mentioned and featured on the cover of the fictional men's magazine Crack Whore, much to her son's disappointment.

== Release ==
Before its premiere on Comedy Central, "Pinkeye" was shown at the first annual New York Comedy Film Festival at New York Film Academy on October 26, 1997. With about 50 films shown in the festival, "Pinkeye" was chosen as the final exhibition to close the festival. Parker and Stone appeared on The Daily Show with Craig Kilborn on October 27, to promote the episode and the first season in general. In its original American television broadcast, "Pinkeye" received a Nielsen Rating of 3.8, meaning the episode was seen by about 1.75 million households. Television journalists said the rating was unusually high for Comedy Central standards; the network averages a 0.6 rating (276,000 households) during prime time, and prior to South Park, the channel's highest rating was a 2.7 (1.24 million households) for the second-season premiere of Absolutely Fabulous. In 2000, The Museum of Television & Radio in Beverly Hills, California held a three-month horror festival called "Monster in the Box: Horror on Television", which included "Pinkeye" in its selection of classic or excellent horror-related television comedy episodes. It also included The Munsters episode "Munster Masquerade" and The Simpsons episode "Treehouse of Horror V".

"Pinkeye" was released, along with 11 other episodes, in a three-DVD set in November 1998. It was included in the second volume, which also included the episodes "An Elephant Makes Love to a Pig", "Death" and "Damien". "Pinkeye" was also one of six episodes included on a 1998 VHS called "South Park Festival Special", which included "Mr. Hankey, the Christmas Poo", "Merry Christmas, Charlie Manson!", "Mr. Hankey's Christmas Classics", "Korn's Groovy Pirate Ghost Mystery", and "Starvin' Marvin". The episode, along with the other twelve from the first season, was also included in the DVD release "South Park: The Complete First Season", which was released on November 12, 2002. Parker and Stone recorded commentary tracks for each episode, but they were not included with the DVDs due to "standards" issues with some of the statements; Parker and Stone refused to allow the tracks to be edited and censored, so they were released in a CD completely separate from the DVDs.

== Cultural references ==
"Pinkeye" included the first appearance of Principal Victoria, the principal of South Park Elementary. Her appearance is based on Comedy Central executive Debbie Liebling, who served as a South Park producer at the time of the episode's broadcast. Unlike Liebling, however, Principal Victoria spoke with a thick Minnesotan accent; the voice was chosen simply because it was an accent voice actress Mary Kay Bergman could do particularly well.

Cartman dresses like Nazi Party leader Adolf Hitler, and occasionally says "Sieg Heil", a common phrase previously used in Nazi Germany. Comedy Central had reservations about the idea and sought ideas for other possible costumes, but Parker and Stone insisted it had to be the Hitler costume. Once the episode aired, however, the two received very few letters from upset viewers over the costume; Parker attributed this to the fact that people were becoming more familiar with the Cartman character, and thus recognized that most of what he said and did was usually wrong. More than Hitler, however, Comedy Central executives were worried about the use of Chewbacca costumes throughout the episode because of George Lucas' well-known tendency to file lawsuits against unauthorized Star Wars references or parodies. The channel contacted his production company, Lucasfilm, about the episode and was asked to send a copy of the episode to them for review. The voice used by the supposedly actual Adolf Hitler in the educational video shown to Cartman is based on Monty Python alum John Cleese's Hitler impression, which both Parker and Stone particularly praised.

Actress and singer Tina Yothers, best known for her role in the television series Family Ties, is featured in the episode as a celebrity judge in the school's costume judging contest. About one year after the episode aired, Stone met Yothers at a venue where she was performing with her band. Stone was uncomfortable because it was the first time he had met a celebrity the show previously mocked, but Yothers said she was a big fan of the show and enjoyed her parody appearance. She used a clip of Kyle saying "Up yours, Tina Yothers" from the episode as an introductory sound clip to introduce her band's shows.

Kenny is turned into a zombie after a mortician accidentally knocks Worcestershire sauce, a fermented liquid condiment, into his embalming fluid. Parker and Stone originally planned to have a Dr Pepper fall into the embalming fluid (in a belated response to that product's slogan "Dr Pepper, What's the Worst That Could Happen?"), but it was changed after the soft drink company objected to that use of their product.

The episode features a parody of the Michael Jackson song "Thriller", as well as the music video. When Chef becomes a zombie, he is dressed like Jackson from the "Thriller" video, and he and the other zombies dance in a similar way. Chef also shouts "Oh" the same way Jackson often did during music performances. The song Chef sings is also similar to the actual "Thriller" song, but Parker said they deliberately made it "(just) different enough that we can't get sued". Stan is ridiculed for his likeness to Raggedy Andy, based on the rag doll character by children's writer Johnny Gruelle; Stan's girlfriend Wendy was originally supposed to dress as Raggedy Ann with Stan, but she instead chose to dress as Chewbacca. When Cartman later dons a "ghost" costume, it resembles a costume from the Ku Klux Klan, the militant white supremacy organization. Parker and Stone said they feel Klan jokes are particularly funny because the concept of KKK is so stupid. Stone said, "Dressing up like ghosts to scare black people is just stupid. Stupidly funny." The zombie-version of Kenny is said to resemble Edward James Olmos, the American actor who played Lt. Martin Costillo in Miami Vice.

== Reception ==
"Pinkeye" has been described as one of the classic episodes of South Park. In "Doug Pratt's DVD-Video Guide", Pratt, a DVD reviewer and Rolling Stone contributor, calls "Pinkeye" his favorite episode of the first season of South Park, "We like it primarily because the subject – a horror satire – seems ideally suited for the show's irreverent attitude." Eric Mink of the New York Daily News complimented the episode, which he felt illustrated many of the outrageous and shocking elements that had made South Park so popular. He said the episode was particularly notable for its graphic violence, "Most sitcoms would have a problem doing an episode in which one regular character slices another regular character in half with a chainsaw. Not South Park." Mike Higgins of The Independent said this episode helped "cement (Eric Cartman's) position as one of the great, obnoxious characters of the Nineties", particularly through his Adolf Hitler Halloween costume.

Matt Roush of USA Today said of the episode, "Absurdly nihilistic and savagely derisive ... South Park's twisted take on a holiday special will delight anyone who favors SweeTarts over candy corn." Kevin M. Williams of the Chicago Sun-Times described the episode as "a Halloween-themed tour de force of crudeness, a wild romp with blood, brains and gore." Vijay Ramanavarapu of The Plain Dealer said the episode was "very offensive", particularly for its mockery of Kyle for his Judaism. The Baltimore Sun also described the episode as offensive and said of it, "Looking for sophisticated humor, finely honed satire and superior animation in your cartoons? Then stay far away from Comedy Central tonight."

RealSouthPark.com, a 1999 website that examined real-life people and places that may have inspired South Park episodes, suggested the settings in "Pinkeye" may have been inspired by a supposedly haunted hotel in Fairplay, Colorado, a Park County town that serves as the basis for the South Park location within the show. In a review of the site, however, The Australian suggested the interpretation was unlikely, since the hotel is rumored to be haunted by ghosts, not zombies.
