= Luis Soto =

Luis Soto may refer to:

- Luis Soto Mendez (born 1995), Costa Rican artistic gymnast
- Luis F. Soto, film and television director
- Luis Soto (footballer) (born 1946), Colombian footballer
