= She's the Sheriff =

American television sitcom (1987–1989)

- Genre: Sitcom
- Created by: Dan Guntzelman; Steve Marshall
- Written by: Cheryl Alu; Gene Braunstein; Bobby Fine; Dan Guntzelman; Lawrence H. Hartstein; Juliet Law Packer; Steve Marshall; Mark Miller; Marty Nadler; Barry O'Brien; Bob Perlow; Richard Rossner; Mark Rothman
- Directed by: David Grossman; Gary Menteer; Lee Miller; Russ Petranto; Alan Rafkin; Doug Smart; Howard Storm
- Starring: Suzanne Somers; George Wyner; Pat Carroll; Nicky Rose; Taliesin Jaffe; Lou Richards; Guich Koock; Leonard Lightfoot
- Theme music composer: Bruce Miller
- Composer: Bruce Miller
- Country of origin: United States
- Original language: English
- No. of seasons: 2
- No. of episodes: 44 (plus unaired pilot)

Production
- Executive producer: Mark Rothman
- Camera setup: Multi-camera
- Running time: 22–24 minutes
- Production company: Lorimar-Telepictures

Original release
- Network: Syndication
- Release: September 19, 1987 – April 1, 1989

She's the Sheriff is an American television sitcom that aired in first-run syndication from September 19, 1987, to April 1, 1989. Produced by Lorimar Television, the series marked the return of Suzanne Somers to television for the first time since she left her role as Chrissy Snow on ABC's Three's Company in 1980.

In 2002, She's the Sheriff was ranked number 44 on TV Guide's "50 Worst TV Shows of All Time".

== Synopsis ==
Somers stars as Hildy Granger, a young woman whose husband, the sheriff of fictional Lakes County, Nevada (near Lake Tahoe), has died suddenly. Now a widow with two children to support, Hildy accepts the county commissioner's offer to appoint her to serve as sheriff herself, despite her lack of relevant experience. The show focuses on her efforts to handle the daily problems of locals and tourists, while learning to work with her four deputies. In particular, Hildy has regular battles with Deputy Max Rubin, who thinks her undeserving of the job.

== Cast and characters ==
- Suzanne Somers as Hildy Granger, the newly appointed Sheriff of Lakes County, Nevada
- George Wyner as Deputy Max Rubin, indignant that he has been passed over for the job of sheriff.
- Pat Carroll as Gussie Holt, Hildy's mother and a part-time writer.
- Lou Richards as Deputy Dennis Putnam, a naïve man who takes things too literally.
- Guich Koock as Deputy Hugh Mulcahy, a man admired for his intelligence.
- Leonard Lightfoot as Deputy Alvin Wiggins, who tries to be a voice of reason.
- Taliesin Jaffe as Hildy's son Kenny
- Nicky Rose as Hildy's daughter Allison.

== Episodes ==
=== Season 1 (1987–88) ===
No. overall	No. in season	Title	Directed by	Written by	Original release date
0	0	"She's the Sheriff"	Alan Rafkin	Mark Rothman	N/A
1	1	"All in a Day's Work"	Alan Rafkin	Mark Rothman	September 19, 1987
2	2	"Butterfly Is Free"	Mark Rothman	Barry O'Brien, Juliet Law Packer	September 26, 1987
3	3	"Unsafe at Any Speed"	Alan Rafkin	Juliet Law Packer	October 3, 1987
4	4	"A Little Romance"	Lee Miller	Gene Braunstein, Bob Perlow	October 10, 1987
5	5	"Lover Boy"	Alan Rafkin	Lawrence H. Hartstein, Richard Rossner	October 17, 1987
6	6	"Monkey Business"	Alan Rafkin, Doug Smart	Mark Miller, Mark Rothman	October 24, 1987
7	7	"Max Moves In"	Doug Smart	Barry O'Brien, Mark Rothman	October 31, 1987
8	8	"Poker Fever" "The Golden Streak"	Russ Petranto	Bobby Fine	November 7, 1987
9	9	"Hildy Gets Shot"	Russ Petranto	Barry O'Brien, Mark Rothman	November 14, 1987
10	10	"Child's Play"	Russ Petranto	Bobby Fine	November 21, 1987
11	11	"Call Me Madam"	Alan Rafkin	Barry O'Brien, Mark Rothman	November 28, 1987
12	12	"The Perils of Pauline"	Russ Petranto	Bobby Fine	December 5, 1987
13	13	"A Hero"	David Grossman	Mark Rothman	December 12, 1987
14	14	"The Feds"	Lee Miller	Simon Hunter	December 19, 1987
15	15	"New Year's Eve"	Russ Petranto	Lawrence H. Hartstein, Richard Rossner	January 2, 1988
16	16	"The Great Escape"	Arlando Smith	Gene Braunstein, Bob Perlow	January 9, 1988
17	17	"Hostage"	Marc Gass	Dan Guntzelman, Steve Marshall	January 16, 1988
18	18	"All Alone"	Russ Petranto	Unknown	January 30, 1988
19	19	"Hildy the Homewrecker"	Russ Petranto	Mark Rothman	February 6, 1988
20	20	"Hair"	Russ Petranto	Lawrence H. Hartstein, Richard Rossner	February 13, 1988
21	21	"Dinsmore's Wedding"	Russ Petranto	Lawrence H. Hartstein, Richard Rossner	February 20, 1988
22	22	"Hildy's First Kiss"	Russ Petranto	Barry O'Brien	February 27, 1988

=== Season 2 (1988–89) ===
No. overall	No. in season	Title	Directed by	Written by	Original release date
23	1	"A Not So Fatal Attraction"	David Grossman	Barry O'Brien	October 8, 1988
24	2	"Hildy's Public Defender"	Russ Petranto	Barry O'Brien	October 15, 1988
25	3	"A Friend in High Places"	Russ Petranto	Marty Nadler	October 22, 1988
26	4	"Have a Nice Day"	Russ Petranto	Unknown	October 29, 1988
27	5	"Gussie Behind Bars"	Gary Menteer	Cheryl Alu	November 5, 1988
28	6	"Max's Ten"	David Grossman	Unknown	November 12, 1988
29	7	"Mulcahy Gets Kicked Out"	Gary Menteer	Mark Miller	November 19, 1988
30	8	"Dream the Implausible Dream"	Gary Menteer	Mark Miller	November 26, 1988
31	9	"Father-Son Banquet"	Russ Petranto	Mark Miller	December 3, 1988
32	10	"Love Hurts"	Michael Miller	Michael Klein	December 10, 1988
33	11	"Down for the Count"	Gary Menteer	Cheryl Alu	December 17, 1988
34	12	"Midnight Run"	Howard Storm	Kimberly Young	January 7, 1989
35	13	"Tastes Great, Less Killing"	Howard Storm	Doug McIntyre	January 14, 1989
36	14	"Divorce, Wiggins Style"	Gary Menteer	Marty Nadler	January 21, 1989
37	15	"Forever Young"	Gary Menteer	Barry O'Brien	February 4, 1989
38	16	"The Teflon Sheriff"	Gary Menteer	Barry O'Brien	February 11, 1989
39	17	"The Mother Mugger"	Gary Menteer	Cheryl Alu	February 18, 1989
40	18	"I'm Okay, You're All Crazy"	Gary Menteer	Cheryl Alu	February 25, 1989
41	19	"Max Gets Trumped"	Gary Menteer	Cheryl Alu	March 4, 1989
42	20	"You Always Hurt the One You Love"	Gary Menteer	Cheryl Alu	March 18, 1989
43	21	"Me Tarzan, You Hildy"	Gary Menteer	Cheryl Alu	March 25, 1989
44	22	"Kissing Cousins"	Gary Menteer	Suzanne Somers	April 1, 1989

== Original pilot ==
The title card for Cass Malloy, 1982.

The series had its origins in the 1982 CBS sitcom pilot Cass Malloy. Creators Dan Guntzelman and Steve Marshall pitched the format to CBS that later became the syndicated She's the Sheriff: that of a late sheriff's wife taking over her husband's job, and the challenges she faced as a woman in a male-oriented environment. Annie Potts was originally cast as the titular Cass Malloy, but she was soon dropped during development in favor of Caroline McWilliams, who was in search of a starring vehicle after leaving the hit ABC series Benson. The pilot was shot and greenlighted by CBS, and aired as a one-off on July 21, 1982. The pilot did not perform to CBS's expectations, and thus was not picked up as a series.

George Wyner and Lou Richards appeared in both Cass Malloy and She's the Sheriff, but in the CBS pilot, their characters' surnames were different. Wyner played Deputy Max Rosenkrantz, who had hoped to fill the shoes of deceased sheriff Big Jim Malloy, but who was now upset about being passed over in favor of Malloy's wife. Richards played Deputy Dennis Little in the pilot. The cast also featured Glynn Turman as officer Woodrow Freeman, a character that served as the basis for Leonard Lightfoot's Alvin Wiggins in She's the Sheriff; Dick Butkus as officer Alvin Dimsky; Murphy Dunne as Adam Barrett; and Dianne Kay (in her first project after Eight is Enough) as Tina Marie Nelson.

Sheriff Cass Malloy had three children in the original pilot: teenager Colleen (Amanda Wyss), preteen Nona (Heather Hobbs) and the youngest, "Little Big" Jim (Corey Feldman). While She's the Sheriff was set in Lakes County, Nevada, Cass Malloy was situated in Burr County, Indiana.

Guntzelman and Marshall would find success as producers a few years later with ABC's Growing Pains, which prompted them to revisit the Cass Malloy teleplay in hopes of finally getting it on the air as a series. Lorimar-Telepictures took an interest in a revised version of the script and greenlighted a series order in 1987 for the then-burgeoning first-run syndication market. Early in production, a two-page ad was placed in the January 5, 1987, issue of Broadcasting & Cable magazine listing the show under the working title Suddenly Sheriff and with Priscilla Barnes as the star (Barnes had been the second replacement for Suzanne Somers on Three's Company.) It is not known exactly when the show's name and casting were finalized.

== Production ==
David Goldsmith and Arthur Silver were the executive producers, Marty Nadler was producer, Wenda Fong was co-producer and Lisa Lewis was associate producer.

== Syndication ==
She's the Sheriff was part of NBC's much-hyped "Prime Time Begins at 7:30" campaign, in which the network's owned-and-operated stations would air first-run sitcoms in the 7:30-8 p.m. time slot to counter competing stations' game shows, sitcom reruns and other offerings. However, this experiment was short-lived, and although She's the Sheriff was renewed for a second season, it was moved to a weekend time slot.

City	Station
Atlanta	WXIA 11
Austin	KBVO 42
Chicago	WGN 9
Concord	WNHT 21
Des Moines	KDSM 17
Detroit	WXON 20
Great Falls	KTGF 16
Greenville	WYFF 4
Hartford	WFSB 3
Honolulu	KGMB 5
Indianapolis	WXIN 59
Joplin	KODE 12
Knoxville	WTVK 26 (This remained on the channel after WTVK became a CBS affiliate in September 1988.)
Little Rock	KASN 38
New York	WNBC 4
Portsmouth	WAVY 10
Providence	WJAR 10
Spokane	KAYU 28
St. Joseph	KQTV 2
Syracuse	WSYT 68
Tequesta	WPBF 25
Toledo	WUPW 36
Washington, D.C.	WRC 4
Wilmington	WECT 6
Wichita	KSNW 3

== In popular culture ==
The South Park episode "Death" refers to She's the Sheriff and parodies it with a cartoon Suzanne Somers having an argument with an inmate.

In the Animaniacs sketch "Boo Wonder" (episode 93), the villain Punchline threatens to sow chaos by programming endless reruns of She's the Sheriff.
