= Patt Shea =

American television writer (1931–2024)

- Born: Patricia Catherine Carmody; April 12, 1931; Sacramento, California, U.S.
- Died: April 12, 2024 (aged 93); Sherman Oaks, California, U.S.
- Other name: Pat Shea
- Occupation: Television writer
- Spouse: Jack Shea

Patricia "Patt" Catherine Carmody Shea (April 12, 1931 – April 12, 2024) was an American television writer and story editor, best known for her work on sitcoms including All in the Family and its spin-offs. She was co-founder and chair of Catholics in Media Associates (CIMA).

== Early life and education ==
Patricia Carmody was born in Sacramento, California, the daughter of William P. Carmody and Margaret M. Carmody. Her father was a real estate agent. The Carmody family were Catholic; her sister became a nun. She graduated from St. Francis High School and Immaculate Heart College. She also attended Sacramento Junior College, and took writing classes at UCLA.

== Career ==
Shea wrote and was a story editor in television, especially for sitcoms, often with her writing partner Harriett Weiss. Shea and Weiss wrote the final episode of All in the Family, "Too Good Edith". She received her first nomination for a Humanitas Prize for the episode. She co-created the spin-off show Gloria, and had producer credits on the show; she was also a staff writer for Archie Bunker's Place from 1979 to 1983. In 1980, she testified before a Congressional committee on "media portrayal of the elderly".

In 1992, Shea and her husband co-founded Catholics in Media Associates (CIMA), and she was chair of the organization. She was a member of the United States Conference of Catholic Bishops Committee for Communications. In 2000 the couple traveled to Rome for a gathering of Catholics in the entertainment industry.

== Television ==
- The Jeffersons (1977–1978, two episodes)
- In the Beginning (1978, two episodes)
- All in the Family (1979, three episodes)
- Sanford (1980, one episode)
- Archie Bunker's Place (1979–1983, 85 episodes)
- Happy Days (1980, one episode)
- Lou Grant (1980–1981, two episodes)
- Cagney & Lacey (1982, one episode)
- Gloria (1982–1983, 22 episodes)
- Mama Malone (1984, one episode)
- Hell Town (1985, one episode)
- Valerie (1987, one episode)
- Nothing is Easy (1987, one episode)
- The Golden Girls (1987, one episode)
- I Married Dora (1987, one episode)
- Marblehead Manor (1988, two episodes)
- Bagdad Cafe (1990, one episode)
- In the Heat of the Night (1992, one episode)

== Personal life ==
Carmody married director Jack Shea in 1954. They had five children, including Bill Shea and Michael Shea, who became directors. Her daughter Elizabeth died in 2006. Her husband died in 2013, and she died in April 2024, at the age of 93, in Sherman Oaks, California. Her daughter and caregiver Shawn Shea died in February 2024; the mother and daughter had a joint memorial service in April 2024.
