= Shadow Chasers =

- Genre: Science fiction Mystery
- Created by: Brian Grazer; Kenneth Johnson
- Starring: Dennis Dugan; Trevor Eve
- Composer: Joe Harnell
- Country of origin: United States
- Original language: English
- No. of seasons: 1
- No. of episodes: 14 (4 unaired)

Production
- Executive producers: Kenneth Johnson; Brian Grazer
- Running time: 60 minutes
- Production companies: Kenneth Johnson/Brian Grazer Productions; Warner Bros. Television

Original release
- Network: ABC
- Release: November 14, 1985 – January 16, 1986

Shadow Chasers is an American science fiction mystery television series created by Brian Grazer and Kenneth Johnson. Fourteen episodes were produced, ten of which were shown on the ABC television network, the remaining four on the Armed Forces Network. It debuted on November 14, 1985, and was produced by Warner Bros. Television.

== Plot ==
Shadow Chasers features strait-laced British anthropologist Jonathan MacKensie (played by Trevor Eve), who works for the fictional Georgetown Institute Paranormal Research Unit (PRU). In the pilot, MacKensie's department head, Dr. Julianna Moorhouse (Nina Foch), withholds a research grant to force him into investigating a supposed "haunting" involving a teenage boy (Bobby Fite). He is paired with flamboyant reporter and popular author Edgar "Benny" Benedek (Dennis Dugan) to reduce the length of the investigation, over Moorhouse's objections; she does not want a sensationalist who writes for the supermarket tabloids to be associated with the Georgetown Institute. Benny and Jonathan did not get along, but managed to solve the case despite their differences.

As the series continued, Jonathan and Benny grudgingly learned to respect each other and their different skills. Some episodes featured out-of-body experiences, genuine paranormal powers, and even bringing Dr. Moorhouse into the field on occasion. Other episodes had Benny and Jonathan investigating unreal happenings, running afoul of clever criminals, and defeating them. To Dr. Moorhouse's irritation, Benny was often able to turn his experiences into best-selling popular books and appearances on the late night talk show circuit. Despite this, she continued to promote the partnership of Benny and Jonathan in their investigations.

== Cast ==
- Dennis Dugan as Edgar 'Benny' Benedek
- Trevor Eve as Dr. Jonathan MacKensie
- Nina Foch as Dr. Juliana Moorhouse
- Teresa Ganzel as Christy

== Episodes ==
No.	Title	Directed by	Written by	Original release date
1 2	"Pilot"	Kenneth Johnson	Kenneth Johnson & Brian Grazer	November 14, 1985
Benny and Jonathan investigate a haunting at a house in Oregon owned by the physicist descendent of a witch executed in 1642 during the Salem witch hysteria, who died in a fire after none of the residents on his street would aid his son who was begging for help. The question is whether or not the hauntings are paranormal in origin, which is what Jonathan and Benny must determine.
3	"The Spirit of St. Louis"	Victor Lobl	Craig Buck	November 21, 1985
Two national museums are arguing over which should possess and display "The Stone of Tutankhamun." The Stone is in St. Louis, where Benny and Jonathan each have close encounters with the Curse of King Tut. A street gang who worship the Boy King has definite plans for the Stone ... and for Benny.
4	"Amazing Grace"	Barbara Peeters	Susan Goldberg & Bob Rosenfarb	November 28, 1985
Following an auto accident, Benny has a near-death experience, which gives him a lead on a series of murders intended to look like normal deaths of terminally ill patients in a hospital. He and Jonathan are guided in their pursuit of the killer by the spirit of one of the deceased.
5	"The Middle of Somewhere"	Chuck Braverman	Renee Longstreet & Harry Longstreet	December 5, 1985
While on the way to a conference on the paranormal, Jonathan, Dr. Moorhouse, and Benny are aboard an airliner that crashes. They survive, only to find themselves resident in a mysterious, isolated compound named "Whitewood." Whitewood is populated by the famous and notorious, including Amelia Earhart, The Three Musketeers, Elvis Presley, Larry Fine of The Three Stooges, and Wyatt Earp. Whitewood is run by a man named Mr. Cooper. Are they in purgatory, or a very strange insane asylum?
6	"Parts Unknown"	Bob Sweeney	Linda Campanelli & M. M. Shelley Moore	December 12, 1985
Benny and Jonathan are investigating cases of people being buried alive. Benny appears to die of a heart attack, but Jonathan is suspicious of the timing. When his casket is exhumed and found to be empty, Jonathan pursues his theory that something evil is afoot, and uncovers a macabre secret.
7	"The Many Lives of Jonathan"	Cliff Bole	Richard Manning & Hans Beimler	December 19, 1985
A neuroscience experiment increases Jonathan's sensitivity to mental stimulation. Following the experiment, Dr. Moorhouse sends Jonathan and Benny to learn why a burned 1940s residential hotel is resisting its own demolition. They break into the hotel to find the truth. In the process, Jonathan is possessed by a number of ghosts, each with unfinished business on this plane.
8	"Phantom of the Galleria"	Alan Myerson	Peggy Goldman	December 26, 1985
A former beauty queen is rescued from an attempted gang-rape after hours in the Santa Maria Galleria Mall by "a mysterious creature." The local railroad museum provides a legend about a wronged tycoon haunting the town, and its railroading history. However, a strange smell at the mall may be the key to solving the mystery.
9	"How Green Was My Murder"	Tony Mordente	Susan Goldberg & Bob Rosenfarb	January 9, 1986
A scientist researching plant communication is apparently strangled by one of his plants. Jonathan is sent by Dr. Moorhouse to get to the bottom of it. Benny, pursuing the same story, links up with him. When more plant-related deaths occur, it's up to the duo to solve the case, without being murdered themselves.
10	"Let's Make A Deal"	Barbara Peeters	Peggy Goldman	January 16, 1986
At a debate during a Senatorial primary the incumbent, Senator McLucas, drops dead of a heart attack. One of the other candidates, Gwen Page, a Georgetown alumna, successful lawyer who has argued before the Supreme Court, and member of the House of Representatives, tells Jonathan, Benny, and Dr. Moorhouse a story. A classmate, Susie Garlock, made Gwen what she thought was a gag offer. If Gwen accepted it, she would get everything she wants in life, but her oldest child would become Susie's on his sixteenth birthday ... which is just three days away.
11	"Cora's Stranger"	Alan Myerson	Diane Frolov	1986
In 1939, something strange happened in Blueberry, Minnesota. A sample of an unknown metal recovered at the site was sent to the Georgetown Institute, where it has recently and inexplicably changed shape. Sent to Blueberry, Jonathan and Benny focus on Cora Walsh, an elderly woman who was present that night, only to be chased off by the Army and Dr. Moorhouse. Neither wants it known that there has been a close encounter of the third kind, and something that began back then is now coming to a climax.
12	"Curse of the Full Moon"	Bob Sweeney	Maryanne Kasica & Michael Scheff	1986
Following an unconfirmed report of a werewolf attack, Jonathan is dispatched to investigate. He links up with Benny near the reported attack site and the investigation proceeds. Human footprints are found mixed in with the wolf tracks. If there really IS a werewolf running with the local wolf pack, they are in deadly danger. But the truth is even stranger than they suspect.
13	"Blood and Magnolias"	Chuck Bowman	Maryanne Kasica & Michael Scheff	1986
Dr. Moorhouse sends Jonathan and Benny to North Carolina to investigate an alleged vampire encounter. They find the victim, Joan Collingswood, has died of extreme anemia; and hear the legend of a vampire who is hunting the Collingswood family. Their investigation leads them to a moldering mansion occupied by an old man and his servant. Have the two of them discovered a real vampire, or merely an eccentric and his minion?
14	"Ahead of Time"	Tony Mordente	Renee Longstreet & Harry Longstreet	1986
Jonathan encounters a girl named Laurie Wilson in his apartment, who claims to be working for "Doctor Benedek" at Georgetown. She says that Benedek sent her back from the year 2016 to help Jonathan deal with a problem in the now that will have disastrous consequences then. The premise is that by stopping a man named Michael Tipton from assassinating the President of the United States and the Premier of Russia, the world will be saved from nuclear war.

== Reception ==
Only nine episodes (counting the two hour pilot as a single episode) were shown in the U.S. Four others were only shown overseas on the Armed Forces Network during the original run of the series. The pilot frequently appears on cable, particularly on the Mystery Channel.

The show was the lowest-rated of 106 programs during the 1985-1986 TV season, (due in part to being broadcast in the same time slot as NBC's The Cosby Show and Family Ties and CBS's Magnum P.I. and later, Simon & Simon) averaging only a 5.8/9 rating/share. This competition had been the focus of a series of humorous commercials for the series, starring such luminaries of the time as Ricardo Montalbán and Ron Howard. While heavily promoted during the network's mini-series North and South, the commercials proved to be prophetic, in that the series drew small audiences, and was frequently pre-empted in some markets.

== Ratings ==
No.	Title	Air Date	Time	Rank	Rating	Viewers (Millions)
1 & 2	Pilot	November 14, 1985	Thursday at 8:00 P.M.	#67 of 68	6.9	5.9
3	The Spirit of St. Louis	November 21, 1985	Thursday at 8:00 P.M.	#60 of 61	5.7	4.9
4	Amazing Grace	November 28, 1985	Thursday at 8:00 P.M.	#67 of 68	6.2	5.3
5	The Middle of Somewhere	December 5, 1985	Thursday at 8:00 P.M.	#71 of 72	5.3	4.5
6	Parts Unknown	December 12, 1985	Thursday at 8:00 P.M.	#70 of 71	5.5	4.7
7	The Many Lives of Jonathan	December 19, 1985	Thursday at 8:00 P.M.	#66 of 66	6.2	5.3
8	Phantom of the Galleria	December 26, 1985	Thursday at 8:00 P.M.	#65 of 67	6.7	5.7
9	How Green Was My Murder	January 9, 1986	Thursday at 8:00 P.M.	#69 of 69	4.7	4.0
10	Let's Make A Deal	January 16, 1986	Thursday at 8:00 P.M.	#71 of 71	5.0	4.3
11	Cora's Stranger	N/A	Unaired	N/A	N/A	N/A
12	Curse of the Full Moon	N/A	Unaired	N/A	N/A	N/A
13	Blood and Magnolias	N/A	Unaired	N/A	N/A	N/A
14	Ahead of Time	N/A	Unaired	N/A	N/A	N/A

Source: A.C. Nielsen Company via Los Angeles Times
