= The Long Summer of George Adams =

1982 television film by Stuart Margolin

- Genre: Drama
- Based on: The Long Summer of George Adams by Weldon Hill
- Written by: John Gay
- Directed by: Stuart Margolin
- Starring: James Garner; Joan Hackett
- Music by: Murray MacLeod; Stuart Margolin; J.A.C. Redford
- Country of origin: United States
- Original language: English

Production
- Producers: S. Bryan Hickox; Meta Rosenberg
- Production locations: Cushing, Texas; Maydelle, Texas; Rusk, Texas; Texas State Railroad, Rusk, Texas
- Cinematography: Andrew Jackson
- Editor: George R. Rohrs
- Running time: 100 minutes
- Production company: Warner Bros. Television

Original release
- Network: NBC
- Release: January 18, 1982

The Long Summer of George Adams is a 1982 American made-for-television drama film starring James Garner and Joan Hackett. The film was directed by Stuart Margolin, and was based upon a novel by Weldon Hill.

== Plot ==
Set in 1952, George Adams is a man at the end of his rope. He is a steam-engine fitter working for the railroad at a way station in his hometown of Cushing, Oklahoma. He finds himself working, though, at a time when the railroads are converting from steam engines to diesel-electrics. Just like the engines on which he works, he knows his time of usefulness for the railroad is running out. To make ends meet, he has taken a second job as the town's night watchman. This has created George's greatest frustration. The schedule he is on has him sleeping each night in the attic, waking at midday to his wife, Norma, making lunch for his two boys. Between the two jobs he works and his wife's schedule with the family, almost no time remains for George to be alone with Norma. This strikes him as a particularly cruel blow, and in frustration, he questions her interest. She assures him she would welcome a visit, but finds the schedule is working against them. In the back of his mind, George keeps believing a man could be happy if he could have his wife and family in his own home on his own piece of land.

George struggles to hold his home and family together. He is good friends with Ernie, a Korean War veteran who is hopelessly in love with Norma's younger sister, who lives with the family. A number of events ensue, including a playful bout of fisticuffs in the ring with a local chicken farmer. George slips just as he is being punched, ending the fight with an apparent knock down. This is a point of great embarrassment and disappointment for his two boys. When his wife leaves town with the family to visit relatives, he confides to Ernie this is going to be a long summer. With his wife away, George succumbs to a brief affair with his neighbor. This is not a well-kept secret as George might hope, though his wife never finds out. George and Ernie end up stopping a bank robbery. Finally, George receives the letter he had been dreading from the railroad company, a transfer order to Gunther, a town to which his wife and he have no interest in moving. George finally puts his foot down, deciding to quit the railroad and return to his father's nearby homestead, to build his family a home and return to a life of farming in Cushing.

== Cast ==
- James Garner as George Adams
- Joan Hackett as Norma Adams
- Alex Harvey as Ernie
- Juanin Clay as Ann Sharp
- Anjanette Comer as Venida
- David Graf as Olin Summers
- Helena Humann as Vi
- Jessie Lee Fulton as Ada May
- Bill Thurman as Floyd
- Marla Maddoux as Mandy
- Bobby Fite as Bill Adams
- Blake Tannery as Leroy Adams
- Joe Satterwhite as Ben Adams
- Darryl Royal as Al Green
- Jack Garner as Woody Pierce

== Production ==
The story of an average man in a small Oklahoma town had been of interest to Garner for some time prior to the shooting of the picture. Garner was a native of Oklahoma, and had held onto the script for 10 years. A number of Garner's crew from The Rockford Files participated in the making of the movie, including Stuart Margolin, who directed the project.

The movie was well received. People Magazine noted: "Garner’s wry style and an excellent supporting cast make this TV movie worthwhile."
