= Death (South Park) =

- South Park episode
- Episode no.: Season 1 Episode 6
- Directed by: Matt Stone
- Written by: Trey Parker; Matt Stone
- Production code: 106
- Original air date: September 17, 1997

Episode chronology
← Previous "An Elephant Makes Love to a Pig"	Next → "Pinkeye"
- South Park season 1

"Death" is the sixth episode of the first season of the American animated television series South Park. It first aired on Comedy Central in the United States on September 17, 1997. In the episode, Grandpa Marvin tries to convince Stan to kill him, while the parents of South Park protest the crude cartoon Terrance and Phillip. Death himself arrives to kill Kenny, and presents a warning to Grandpa Marvin against forcing others to help him commit suicide.

"Death" was written by series creators Trey Parker and Matt Stone and directed by Stone on his first solo directorial work for an episode in the show. The episode, along with the Terrance and Phillip show, were inspired by early criticism that South Park was little more than flatulence jokes and primitive animation. The episode portrays the parents as being so invested in protesting television programs that they fail to pay any attention to what is going on in their children's lives. They want to make television clean and wholesome so the entertainment industry can raise their kids, while they themselves do not have to make the time and effort to be full-time parents. The episode also advocates against censorship and addresses the morality and ethics of euthanasia.

"Death" was the last of the original six South Park episodes ordered by Comedy Central before the network committed to a full season. The episode's plot heavily influenced the screenplay of the 1999 feature film adaptation South Park: Bigger, Longer & Uncut, which also involves the parents of South Park protesting Terrance and Phillip. In addition to Terrance and Phillip, the episode introduced recurring characters Grandpa Marsh and Sheila (then known as Carol), Kyle's mother.

== Plot ==
The Marsh family celebrates Grampa Marsh's 102nd birthday, but he is tired of living and tries unsuccessfully to commit suicide. He tries to convince Stan to kill him, but Stan refuses because he fears he might get in trouble. Meanwhile, Kyle watches the cartoon Terrance and Phillip, which revolves largely around fart jokes. Kyle's mother gets outraged by the foul language and crude humor, and contacts other South Park parents to organize a boycott at the Cartoon Central headquarters in New York City. Later at school, Stan asks Mr. Garrison, Chef and Jesus whether he should help his grandpa kill himself, but they avoid discussing the issue, much to Stan's anger.

Meanwhile, Kenny suffers from a bout of "explosive diarrhea", which spreads to others in the town, including the adults protesting Terrance and Phillip. Despite objecting to the show, the adults themselves laugh and make jokes at their own real-life toilet humor. Carol proclaims that if Cartoon Central does not take the show off the air, the protesters will kill themselves, and they start using a slingshot to send themselves flying into the building. With the adults out of town for the protest, the boys are free to watch Terrance and Phillip at their leisure. Grandpa Marvin continues asking Stan to kill him, and demonstrates how terrible his life is by locking Stan in a room and forcing him to listen to a song in the style of Enya's "Orinoco Flow". Now convinced that his life is excruciating, Stan finally agrees to kill his grandpa, and tries to do so by rigging a cow on a pulley and dropping it on him. Just as the boys are about to do it, Death himself arrives, but starts chasing after the boys instead of Grandpa Marvin.

While fleeing, Stan calls his mother, who is too busy protesting Terrance and Phillip to listen to his problems. More than a dozen people have killed themselves against the headquarters building. Eventually, the network agrees to take the show off the air, not because of the deaths but because of the stench of the protesters' explosive diarrhea. Meanwhile, Death continues chasing the boys, but stops in front of a television playing Terrance and Phillip. Death and the boys start laughing together, but after it is taken off the air, Death angrily touches and kills Kenny. Angered, Grandpa Marvin demands that Death kill him, but Death refuses. Death then brings in the spirit of Stan's great-great-grandfather (Marvin's grandfather), who was killed by Marvin when he was Stan's age; the ghost warns Marvin that he must die of natural causes and not place the burden of his suicide on anybody else's shoulders or else he will spend his eternity after death in limbo.

Terrence and Phillip is replaced by the Suzanne Somers show She's the Sheriff which also contains obscenities. Furious about all this, the parents go back to the Cartoon Central network building to protest again. Grandpa Marvin decides to visit Africa, where over 400 people are "naturally" eaten by lions every year. The episode ends with the boys laughing, and then laughing harder when Kyle farts.

== Production ==
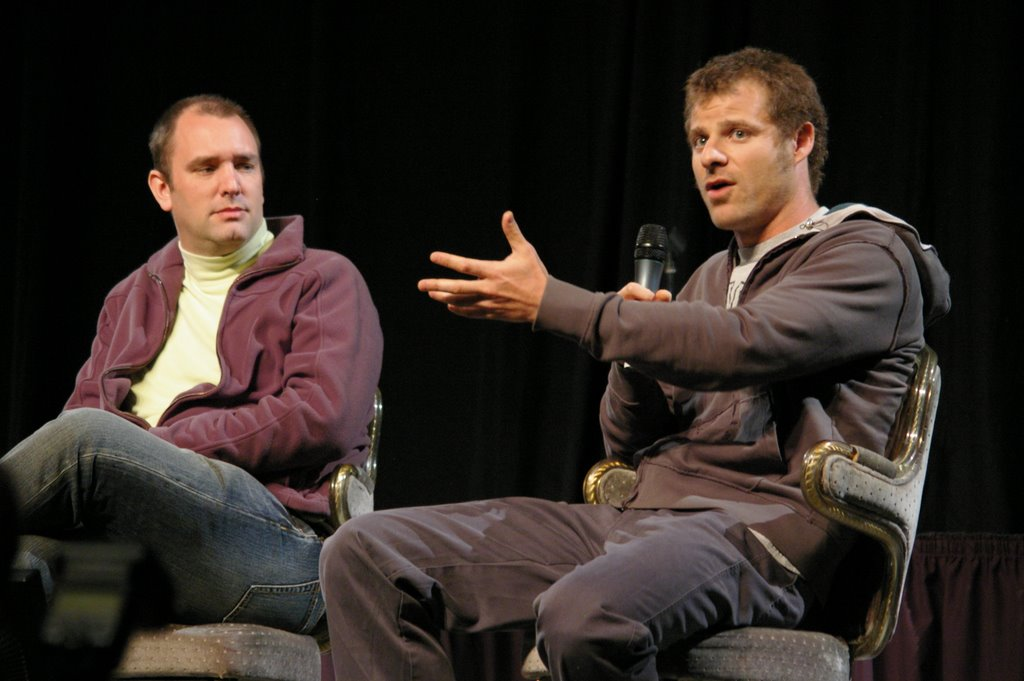
South Park co-creators Trey Parker and Matt Stone wrote "Death"

"Death" was written and directed by series co-creators Trey Parker and Matt Stone. It was the last of the original six South Park episodes ordered by Comedy Central before the network committed to a full season of 13 episodes. Parker long wanted to feature a Grim Reaper-like death character in South Park, as he had enjoyed drawing cartoon images of Death riding on a tricycle since his childhood. This was the inspiration behind a scene in which Death inexplicably rides a tricycle while chasing the South Park boys through the streets.

The subplot of Kenny McCormick's diarrhea problems came from a real-life high school experience from Stone, who said students used to offer each other $20 if they would pass a note to the teacher explaining they had "explosive diarrhea", like Kenny did in the episode. The image of Kenny sitting on a toilet in "Death" became a popular South Park poster. "Death" included a consistency error in that Mr. Garrison's classroom had its own separate bathroom, which has never again been seen on the show. During one scene, Cartman moons Kyle while making fun of Kyle's mother. Comedy Central censors forced Parker and Stone to remove the image of Cartman's bare bottom, although such images would be allowed in future episodes. A man named Mr. McCormick was killed in "Death" after he was flung via slingshot into the Cartoon Central building. The character's name led many to mistakenly believe it was Kenny's father, Stuart McCormick, but Parker denied this and said the similar character names were just a coincidence. The character appears again very briefly in a later episode, "Starvin' Marvin".

== Themes ==
During the first few weeks of South Park's run, Parker and Stone received criticism from some commentators and media outlets that the series was little more than flatulence jokes and primitive animation, and thus must be a simple show to produce. "Death" was written in response to that criticism. The episode introduced Terrance and Phillip, a comedy duo with a popular cartoon series within the South Park universe, whose show is literally nothing but a series of flatulence jokes, with even cruder animation than South Park itself.

The episode's script parodied parents who voiced strong opposition to South Park, portraying them as so invested in fighting the television program that they fail to pay attention to what is going on in their children's lives. This is illustrated in the episode when Stan calls his mother seeking help because Death is chasing him, only for his mother to ignore him because she is too busy protesting the Terrance and Phillip show. This is also demonstrated by the line Kyle says, "I think that parents only get so offended by television because they rely on it as a babysitter and the sole educator of their kids."

"Death" warns against such misplaced values and condemns the practice of censorship, as well as demonstrating there can be value in a show often dismissed as juvenile and immature, like South Park or Terrance and Phillip. The episode also takes the position that parents who blame their children's behavior entirely on television are evading true responsibility for problems that likely have roots elsewhere. The plot of "Death" heavily influenced the screenplay Parker and Stone wrote for their 1999 film, South Park: Bigger, Longer & Uncut. The plot and theme of both scripts revolve heavily around the parents of South Park protesting Terrance and Phillip due to the perceived negative influence it has over their children. Parker said, "After about the first year of South Park, Paramount already wanted to make a South Park movie, and we sort of thought this episode would make the best model just because we liked the sort of pointing at ourselves kind of thing."

"Death" also touches upon the issue of euthanasia, and whether it is morally or ethically wrong to commit suicide. The episode's script indicates it is wrong for someone wishing to kill oneself to place the burden of that decision on a loved one: in this case, Grandpa Marvin demanding that Stan kill him, without considering how traumatizing an experience it would be for Stan. This is most strongly illustrated at the end of the episode, in which the ghost of Marvin's grandfather (who had Marvin kill him long ago) tells Marvin he must not force Stan to commit such a traumatizing act. Although the ghost tells Grandpa Marvin he must die of "natural causes", Marvin nevertheless continues seeking ways to kill himself, but without involving other people. Parker said this reflects his opinion that, "Basically, it is OK to kill yourself, but you shouldn't ask someone else to do it and put someone else through the trip."

== Cultural references and impact ==
"Death" introduced several characters who would maintain important recurring roles throughout the rest of the series. Among them were Sheila Broflovski and Grandpa Marvin Marsh. Sheila and Gerald Broflovski, Kyle's parents, were named after Stone's parents, although he insists the characters are nothing like his real parents. Marvin Marsh was not based on any real-life person (although he shares the name of Parker's maternal grandfather, Marvin Kimble), but Parker and Stone wanted to create a rude and unlikeable grandfather character because they felt most elderly people were portrayed as sweet and lovable on television. Originally, they wanted Marvin Marsh to be known as the "molesting grandpa" who kept making sexual comments to Stan and attempting to play inappropriate games with him, but Comedy Central refused to allow it, which Parker said was "probably the right call". Terrance and Phillip are loosely based on Parker and Stone themselves, and were also inspired by the Itchy & Scratchy characters from The Simpsons, as well as the protagonists from the MTV cartoon Beavis and Butt-Head. Although "Death" marked the first appearance of Terrance and Phillip, Parker said the duo "took on a life of their own". They have made frequent appearances throughout the rest of the series, and played a major role in South Park: Bigger, Longer & Uncut.

The episode refers to Jack Kevorkian, the right-to-die activist best known for his advocacy of physician-assisted suicide, although Kyle mistakenly refers to him as "Jack Leborkian". When Terrance and Phillip is cancelled in "Death", it is replaced by She's the Sheriff, a sitcom starring actress Suzanne Somers. The Cartoon Central network in "Death" is based on a mix between Cartoon Network and Comedy Central, the latter the real-life television network that broadcasts South Park. John Warsog, the man who runs Cartoon Central in "Death", is based on Doug Herzog, the Comedy Central executive who was responsible for bringing South Park to the network. Herzog was excited to be featured in the episode and enjoyed the portrayal. During one scene, Stan's grandfather locks him in a room and plays music by the Irish vocalist Enya as a form of torture to show Stan what it is like to be his age, and convince Stan to kill him. The parody of Enya's Orinoco Flow used in "Death" was sung by Toddy Walters, who played protagonist Polly Pry in Trey Parker's 1996 film, Cannibal! The Musical. "Death" marked the first appearance of Snacky Cakes, one of Cartman's favorite snack foods.

== Reception ==
In the book Leaving Springfield, author William J. Savage Jr. said the episode "reveals a fine edged attack on censors and a thoughtful and subtle consideration of issues regarding assisted suicide." In the book The Deep End of South Park, Anne Gossage complimented the ambition of the episode's themes of censorship and the morality of assisted suicide, which she called "a great deal of ground to cover in 20 minutes". Gossage also said the episode shared many of the same characteristics of William Shakespeare's play Hamlet, comparing Stan's contemplation of killing his grandfather to Hamlet's dilemmas after encountering his father's ghost.

== Home media ==
"Death" was released alongside five other episodes in a three-VHS set on May 5, 1998, marking the first time South Park was made available on video. The episode was released on the "Volume III" video along with "An Elephant Makes Love to a Pig"; other featured episodes included "Cartman Gets an Anal Probe", "Volcano", "Weight Gain 4000", and "Big Gay Al's Big Gay Boat Ride". "Death", along with the other twelve episodes from the first season, was also included in the DVD release "South Park: The Complete First Season", which was released on November 12, 2002. Parker and Stone recorded commentary tracks for each episode, but they were not included with the DVDs due to "standards" issues with some of the statements; Parker and Stone refused to allow the tracks to be edited and censored, so they were released in a CD separate from the DVDs. In 2008, Parker and Stone made "Death" and all South Park episodes available to watch for free on the show's official website, "South Park Studios".
