= Miss All-American Beauty =

- Directed by: Gus Trikonis
- Written by: Nancy Audley; Emily Tracy
- Produced by: Marcy Gross (producer); Anne Hopkins (associate producer); Robert Huddleston (supervising producer); Marian Rees (executive producer); Ann Weston (producer)
- Starring: Diane Lane; Cloris Leachman; David Dukes; Jayne Meadows; Alice Hirson; Brian Kerwin
- Cinematography: Robert C. Jessup
- Edited by: Byron 'Buzz' Brandt
- Music by: Paul Chihara
- Release date: 27 December 1982 (USA)
- Running time: 96 min
- Country: United States
- Language: English

Miss All-American Beauty is a 1982 American television film directed by Gus Trikonis and starring Diane Lane.

== Plot summary ==
After winning a beauty contest in Texas, a teen-aged girl is unprepared for the demands of travel, press conferences and interviews that go with winning the title and participating in a national beauty pageant.

== Cast ==
- Diane Lane as Sally Butterfield
- Cloris Leachman as Agatha Blaine
- David Dukes as Avery McPherson
- Jayne Meadows as Gertrude Hunnicutt
- Alice Hirson as Marjorie Butterfield
- Brian Kerwin as Michael Carrington
- Norman Bennett as George Butterfield
- Jim Mills as Buzz Butterfield
- Bobby Fite as Petey Butterfield
- Jane Roberts as Dottie Blaine
