= Bobby Fite =

American actor

- Born: Robert Nelson Fite; October 22, 1968 (age 57); Dallas, Texas, U.S.
- Other name: Bob Fite
- Occupation: Actor
- Years active: 1974–1994
- Spouse(s): Cynthia Hayden (divorced); Kristen Tucker-Pittman (present)

Robert Nelson Fite (born October 22, 1968) is an American former film and television actor. Beginning his professional career as a child actor and model at the age of six, Fite is perhaps best known for his recurring role as J.T. Martin on the NBC comedy series Silver Spoons, as well as for his feature film roles in The Best Little Whorehouse in Texas, The Legend of Billie Jean, and Explorers.

== Early life ==
Fite was born in Dallas, Texas to parents Roselle and Robert Fite. Growing up in Dallas, Fite began his show business career at the age of six after taking it upon himself to contact local talent agent Kim Dawson. When recounting the experience years later, Dawson explained, "He said, 'I want to be an actor.' I remember how amazed I was. I told him what he'd have to do, and he said, 'I can do that.'" In the following years, Fite worked as a child actor and model, appearing in local commercials and print advertorials. With his youthful looks and Texas drawl, Fite was frequently cast as the southern boy, primarily playing roles several years younger than his true age throughout most of his career as a child star.

== Career ==
=== Early career ===
In 1982, Fite made his television debut with a co-starring role in the NBC movie-of-the-week, The Long Summer of George Adams. Premiering on NBC's Monday Night at the Movies in January 1982, but filmed when he was twelve years old, Fite portrayed Bill Adams, one of three sons to James Garner's character John Adams, an Oklahoma railroad man in the 1950s, whose job is threatened when plans are made to replace steam engines with diesels. In July of that year, Fite made his feature film debut with a small role as Dulcie Mae's son in Universal's film adaptation of the Broadway musical-comedy The Best Little Whorehouse in Texas, starring Burt Reynolds and Dolly Parton. In December of that same year, Fite appeared in a co-starring role in the CBS television movie Miss All-American Beauty. In the film, Fite portrayed Petey Butterfield, the youngest of two brothers to Diane Lane's character, Sally Butterfield, a girl who struggles with her newfound notoriety and responsibilities after winning a Texas beauty pageant.

=== Increased exposure ===
In January 1983, Fite landed a recurring role on the NBC sitcom Silver Spoons. On the series, Fite portrayed the smooth-talking cowboy with a Texas twang, J.T. Martin, a role that established him as a teen idol among the show's teen and tween audience alongside the show's other teen stars Ricky Schroder and Jason Bateman. Fite was a recurring guest-star on the series for two seasons, and in 1983, his portrayal earned him a Youth in Film Award (now known as the Young Artist Award) nomination as Best Young Actor in a Comedy Series. Later that same year, Fite appeared in his first starring role in an episode of CBS Children's Mystery Theatre, an hour-long anthology showcase for children's films much like the ABC Afterschool Specials and ABC Weekend Specials of the 1970s and 1980s. In the episode "The Dirkham Detective Agency", Fite starred as David, a pre-teen detective, alongside fellow child actors, Mara Hobel (Mommie Dearest) and Leo O'Brien (The Last Dragon), out to solve their first case after two poodles are "dog-napped". On October 21 of that year, Fite guest-starred on the CBS series The Dukes of Hazzard. In the episode "The Boar's Nest Bears", Fite portrayed Tommy, one of the farm boys on Hazzard County's youth basketball team owned by Boss Hogg. On October 29 of that same year, Fite guest-starred on the CBS Saturday morning science-fiction series, Benji, Zax & the Alien Prince. In the episode "The Locals", Fite portrayed Will, the leader of a gang of bullies who cause trouble for the series' three title characters.

In 1985, after finishing two seasons on Silver Spoons, Fite returned to the big screen with a role in the feature film Papa Was a Preacher. In the film, Fite portrayed Eric Lee, one of a team of country brothers who bully a Preacher's sons in a rural 1950s Texas town. In July of that year, Fite was once again cast as the "bully" in Joe Dante's science fiction comedy Explorers. In the film, Fite portrayed Steve Jackson, the leader of a gang of boys who torment the film's protagonists, Ben Crandall (Ethan Hawke) and Wolfgang Müller (River Phoenix). While not considered a commercial success at the time, the film was the feature film debut of both Hawke and Phoenix, and has become something of a cult favorite among fans of 80s sci-fi cinema. One week later, what would be Fite's final feature film appearance, The Legend of Billie Jean was released to theaters. In the film, Fite appeared as a boy who crosses paths with the film's leads, Billie Jean Davy (Helen Slater), and Binx Davy (Christian Slater) outside a mini-mart as they try and outrun the law. The film was Christian Slater's film debut, and yet another example of a perceived box office "failure" at the time of its release, however, it too has become considered something of a cult classic among many '80s film fans. In November 1985, Fite appeared in what would be his final starring role on the short-lived ABC mystery-suspense series Shadow Chasers. In the two-hour pilot episode, Fite guest-starred as Billy Pence, a boy who works with paranormal investigators when he believes a small town is being haunted by his late father's ghost.

=== Later career ===
Throughout the rest of the 1980s, Fite worked behind the scenes on film sets, but did not appear on camera again until 1992, when he returned to acting with a small role in the suspense-thriller Fatal Charm. In the film, Fite portrayed "Bud", a high-school acquaintance of Valerie, played by his former Explorers co-star Amanda Peterson, who finds danger after she falls in love with serial killer, Adam Brenner, portrayed by Christopher Atkins. Although filmed in 1989 and intended for a cable television release, the film was "shelved" for almost three years due to post-production and marketing difficulties and was never aired on cable, but instead was released direct-to-video in February 1992. In September 1994, Fite appeared in what would be his final on-screen role in an episode of Walker, Texas Ranger. In the episode entitled "Badge of Honor", Fite made a cameo appearance in the episode's final scene as a UPS man who delivers a package to Walker.

== Personal life ==
After leaving show business, Fite returned to Dallas, Texas and married Cynthia Hayden in 1996. The two did not have any children together and eventually divorced.

In 2002, Fite began working as a home developer for American Home Remodeling L.C. As of 2011, Fite works as a sales consultant for the Pulte/Centex Corporation and is married to second wife Kristen Tucker-Pittman. The two reside in the Dallas-Fort Worth area and live in a custom home he helped to design.

== Filmography ==
Film
| Year | Film | Role | Notes |
|---|---|---|---|
| 1982 | The Best Little Whorehouse in Texas | Dulcie Mae's Son | |
| 1985 | Papa Was a Preacher | Eric Lee | |
| 1985 | Explorers | Steve Jackson | |
| 1985 | The Legend of Billie Jean | Mini-Mart Boy | |
| 1992 | Fatal Charm | Bud | Direct-to-video |
Television
| Year | Program | Role | Notes |
| 1982 | The Long Summer of George Adams | Bill Adams | TV movie |
| 1982 | Miss All-American Beauty | Petey Butterfield | TV movie |
| 1983 | CBS Children's Mystery Theatre | David | Episode: "Dirkham Detective Agency" |
| 1983 | The Dukes of Hazzard | Tommy | Episode: "The Boar's Nest Bears" |
| 1983 | Benji, Zax & the Alien Prince | Will | Episode: "The Locals" |
| 1983–1984 | Silver Spoons | J.T. Martin | Recurring |
| 1985 | Shadow Chasers | Billy Pence | Episode: "Shadow Chasers (Pilot)" |
| 1994 | Walker, Texas Ranger | Delivery Boy | Episode: "Badge of Honor" |

== Awards ==
| Year | Award | Category | Work | Result | Ref. |
|---|---|---|---|---|---|
| 1982–1983 | Youth in Film Award (now known as the Young Artist Award) | Best Young Actor in a Comedy Series | Silver Spoons | Nominated | |
