= Silver Spoons =

American sitcom (1982–1987)

- Genre: Sitcom
- Created by: Martin Cohan; Howard Leeds; Ben Starr
- Developed by: David W. Duclon; Ron Leavitt; Michael G. Moye
- Directed by: Art Dielhenn; Bob Lally; Jack Shea; Tony Singletary; John Sgueglia
- Starring: Ricky Schroder; Erin Gray; Leonard Lightfoot; Joel Higgins; Franklyn Seales; Alfonso Ribeiro
- Theme music composer: Rik Howard; Bob Wirth
- Opening theme: "Together"
- Ending theme: "Together" (Instrumental)
- Composer: Ray Colcord
- Country of origin: United States
- Original language: English
- No. of seasons: 5
- No. of episodes: 116 (list of episodes)

Production
- Executive producers: David W. Duclon (1982–1984); Robert Illes; James Stein (1984–1985); Steve Pritzker (1985–1986); Jack Humphrey (1986); George Burditt (1987)
- Camera setup: Videotape, Multi-camera
- Running time: 28 minutes (pilot episode); 24 minutes (seasons 1–4); 22 minutes (season 5)
- Production companies: Lightkeeper Productions (1982–1985); Embassy Television (1982–1986); Embassy Communications (1986–1987)

Original release
- Network: NBC
- Release: September 25, 1982 – May 11, 1986
- Network: Syndication
- Release: September 27, 1986 – May 30, 1987

Silver Spoons is an American sitcom television series that aired on NBC from September 25, 1982, to May 11, 1986, and in first-run syndication from September 27, 1986, to May 30, 1987. The series was produced by Embassy Television for the first four seasons, until Embassy Communications moved the series to syndication after being canceled by NBC. Silver Spoons was created by Martin Cohan, Howard Leeds and Ben Starr.

The show focuses on the wealthy playboy Edward Stratton III, and his relationship with his young son Ricky Stratton. Ricky was the product of a brief marriage between Edward and Ricky's mother. Edward was unaware that he had a son until Ricky comes to live with Edward at the outset of the series. The main cast stars Joel Higgins as Edward, Ricky Schroder as Ricky, Leonard Lightfoot as Edward's attorney, Franklyn Seales as Edward's business manager, and Erin Gray as Edward's personal assistant and later love interest. Jason Bateman plays Ricky's best friend over the first two seasons of the show, replaced by Alfonso Ribeiro over the remaining seasons. John Houseman plays Edward's dour and disapproving father.

== Synopsis ==
In the pilot episode, Ricky Stratton (Ricky Schroder) arrives at the mansion of the father he has never met to introduce himself, move in, and get to know him better. Edward Stratton III (Joel Higgins) epitomizes the phrase "overgrown child"; he has never taken responsibility for anything in his life, including his toy business, Eddie's Toys. Ricky recognizes that his father needs to grow up; Edward thinks his son is too uptight and needs to have more fun while he is still young.

Edward's father (Edward Stratton II) is played by John Houseman as the intelligent, well-to-do patriarch and industrialist whose demeanor starkly contrasts with Edward's and seems more similar to Ricky's (at first). Throughout the series, the comic tension arises between Grandfather Stratton's belief that people with money are obligated to make more money and Edward's belief that money should be used to make people happy. Ricky is often caught between the two, wishing only for peace and harmony within the family.

Ricky's mother is Edward's ex-wife, Evelyn Stratton Whiting (Christine Belford). Edward and Evelyn's romantic relationship led to a week-long marriage. Now Evelyn has remarried and placed Ricky in a military boarding school. When Ricky arrives at the Stratton residence, Edward is stunned to discover that his long-ago brief marriage produced a son (when he expresses incredulity because he "wasn't married that long," Ricky points out, "It doesn't take that long"). At first, he sends Ricky right back to the boarding school; later he dresses up as a swamp monster to take Ricky out of the school and back to the mansion to live with him. The mansion is stocked with arcade games and a ridable scale-model freight train runs through it.

Edward exhibits his childishness and playfulness in many ways, such as performing a little dance while the Pac-Man game plays its theme song. Stratton's personal assistant, Kate Summers (Erin Gray), is often the voice of reason. Kate's role adds tension to the show and provides incentive for Edward to act more maturely (at least sometimes). Edward and Kate's will-they-or-won't-they relationship gives way to a third-season wedding.

During the series' early years, Ricky befriends "bad boy" Derek Taylor (Jason Bateman, seasons 1–2), smooth-talking "cowboy" J.T. Martin (Bobby Fite, seasons 1–2), and "nerdy" Freddy Lippincottleman (Corky Pigeon, seasons 1–4). They get into a lot of trouble and learn many childhood lessons along the way. Leslie Crambottom, played by Georgi Irene, has a major crush on Ricky.

Edward's original attorney was Leonard Rollins (Leonard Lightfoot), who departed after the first season, and was replaced by the aptly named business manager, Dexter Stuffins (Franklyn Seales), who was somewhat stuffier and more erudite than Leonard had been. Dexter remained through the rest of the series and was joined in autumn 1984 by his hip, breakdancing nephew Alfonso Spears (Alfonso Ribeiro, seasons 3–5), who became Ricky's new best friend. Once Ricky, Freddy, and Alfonso were in high school in season four, their circle was completed by Brad (Billy Jacoby, seasons 4–5), a reintroduction of the type of "bad-boy" character similar to that of Derek during the show's early years. That year, as Kate and Edward adjusted to married life, Kate's doddering uncle, Harry Summers (Ray Walston), moved into the Stratton mansion.

== Cast ==
The cast of Silver Spoons, season 4

=== Main cast ===
- Ricky Schroder as Richard Bluthorn "Rick" or "Ricky" Stratton
- Joel Higgins as Edward Stratton III
- Erin Gray as Katherine "Kate" Summers-Stratton
- Leonard Lightfoot as Leonard Rollins (Season 1)
- Franklyn Seales as Dexter Roosevelt Stuffins (Guest season 1; Main seasons 2–5)
- Alfonso Ribeiro as Alfonso Spears (Seasons 3–5)

=== Recurring cast ===
- John Houseman as Grandfather Edward Stratton II (Seasons 1–5)
- Jason Bateman as Derek Taylor (Seasons 1–2)
- Bobby Fite as J.T. Martin (Seasons 1–2)
- Corky Pigeon as Fredrick March "Freddy" Lippincottleman (Seasons 1–4)
- Georgi Irene as Leslie Ann Cranbottom (Seasons 2-3)
- Billy Jacoby as Brad Langford (Seasons 4–5)
- Christine Belford as Evelyn Stratton Whiting (Seasons 1–5)
- Ray Walston as Uncle Harry Summers (Season 4)

== Episodes ==
Silver Spoons ran for five seasons with a total of 116 episodes, from September 25, 1982, to May 30, 1987.

Season	Episodes	Originally released		
Season	Episodes	First released	Last released	Network
1	22	September 25, 1982	April 30, 1983	NBC
2	22	October 15, 1983	April 7, 1984	NBC
3	24	September 16, 1984	April 7, 1985	NBC
4	24	September 15, 1985	May 11, 1986	NBC
5	24	September 27, 1986	May 30, 1987	Syndicated

== Production ==
=== Music ===
The show's theme song titled "Together", was written by Rik Howard and Bob Wirth. The original version was accompanied mostly by guitar with vocals by Ron Dante. Two other versions of the theme were used during the show's run. A synthesized version was used in 1985 with a different vocalist. The third version of the theme, a rock version, was introduced in January 1986 and began in use during the second half of season 4 with vocals again by Ron Dante and composed by Ray Colcord.

=== Locations ===
Although the show took place on fictional Mockingbird Lane, Shallow Springs, Long Island, New York, the brick Tudor period mansion shown in the opening credits (representing the Stratton mansion) is actually a private residence located in Warwickshire, England. The elaborate home, named Compton Wynyates, was built in 1481. Before Silver Spoons, it was used in the 1977 Disney film Candleshoe, starring Helen Hayes, Jodie Foster and David Niven.

== Broadcast history ==
=== Initial run ===
Season	Time
1	Saturday at 8:30–9:00 on NBC
2	Saturday at 8:30–9:00 on NBC
3	Sunday at 7:00–7:30 on NBC
4	Sunday at 7:30–8:00 on NBC (September 15, 1985 – March 16, 1986); Sunday at 7:00–7:30 on NBC (May 4–11, 1986)
5	In first-run syndication

=== Reruns and syndication ===
Reruns of Silver Spoons aired as a part of NBC's daytime schedule in the summer of 1985.

The show was also rerun on WWOR's superstation feed from December 28, 1992, to September 3, 1993. Select episodes were also aired on Nick at Nite in 2001 and 2005.

FamilyNet (now The Cowboy Channel) aired reruns of the series nightly, until June 30, 2017, when the network underwent a programming format change the following day. Antenna TV began airing reruns of the series starting in January 2018 until it was removed in December 2025, as well as GAC Family on October 4, 2021 until its removal a few years later.

The series is currently available for streaming online on The Roku Channel and Tubi in the United States and CTV's streaming service, CTV Throwback in Canada.

== International airing ==
In France, the series aired as Ricky ou la Belle Vie (Ricky or the Good Life) as part of a block called Destination Noël (Destination Christmas) from December 21, 1984 until January 2, 1985. Then on Vitamine (Vitamin) under the name Ricky la Belle Vie (Ricky the Good Life) as part of a block Croque-vacances (Holiday Bites) on TF1.

In Italy, the series aired on Canale 5 & Italia 1 as il mio amico Ricky (My Friend Ricky) in 1984.

== Home media ==
On June 19, 2007, Sony Pictures Home Entertainment released the first season of Silver Spoons on DVD in Region 1. As of 2015, this release has been discontinued and is out-of-print.

DVD name	Ep #	Release date
The Complete First Season	22	June 19, 2007
