= Luis F. Soto =

Puerto Rican film and television director

- Born: Hatillo, Puerto Rico
- Education: Interamerican University of Puerto Rico; State University of New York
- Occupations: Film director; television director

Luis Felipe Soto is a Puerto Rican film and television director based in San Juan, Puerto Rico.

== Career ==
The Hatillo, Puerto Rico-born Soto was nominated at CableACE Awards in 1990 as Best Dramatic Director for the HBO film The Vietnam War Story: The Last Outpost. Steve Antin, the lead actor garnered the CableACE for Best Actor.

Soto directed The House Of Ramon Iglesia for PBS's American Playhouse in 1986. The episode was written by José Rivera. The House Of Ramon Iglesia won a silver medal at The Houston Film Festival, as well as The Samuel G. Engel International Film and TV Award.

He has directed episodes for the television series The Equalizer, with Edward Woodward and Macaulay Culkin, for Universal Studios, Fame for MGM, Silk Stalkings for USA Network, Reyes y Rey for Telemundo and Silver Spoons for Columbia Pictures among others. Soto has directed commercials for, among others, AT&T, Budweiser, Pepsi, American Express, McDonald's, US Army, USPS, ARCO, and Folgers. Among his documentaries he has directed Reflections Of Our Past for PBS and Dream of Empire for National Geographic and The St. Augustine Historical Society.

Soto has served on The New York Council of the Arts as well as The Directors Guild of America Latino Committee. The Vuelva Film Festival recognized Luis for his work and invited him to head seminars and screened his films.

Soto directed at The Eugene Theater Conference in Connecticut, under the artistic direction of Lloyd Richards, then the Dean of The Yale School of Drama. He is a member of The Actors Studio, Playwrights/Directors Unit West. Soto attended the Interamerican University of Puerto Rico and graduated with a Master of Arts from the State University of New York.

He is currently in the post-production stage of his most recent film, Just Below Sunset.

Soto was awarded The Purple Heart Medal for his combat service in the Vietnam war.
