= Jack Shea (director) =

American television director (1928–2013)

- Born: John Francis Shea, Jr. August 1, 1928; New York City, U.S.
- Died: April 28, 2013 (aged 84); Tarzana, California, U.S.
- Occupation: Director
- Years active: 1958–1997
- Spouse: Patt Shea (m. 1954)

Jack Shea (August 1, 1928 – April 28, 2013) was an American television and film director. He was the president of the Directors Guild of America from 1997 to 2002.

== Life and career ==
Born John Francis Shea, Jr., Shea's father was a traveling salesman and his mother a bookkeeper. He received a parochial high school education, later attaining a degree in history from Fordham University. Shea broke into the entertainment industry in 1951, initially as a stage manager for the TV series Philco Playhouse, and, following two years of service with the United States Air Force, serving from 1952 to 1954, during the Korean War, making instructional films in Los Angeles, and later becoming an associate director.

Among the TV shows he contributed to during this period include The Jerry Lewis Show and The Bob Hope Specials, where he later shared a Primetime Emmy Award nomination for in 1961. By the late 1950s, Shea had become instrumental in forming the Radio and Television Directors Guild (merged with the Screen Directors Guild in 1960 to form the Directors Guild of America) and was a strong voice for the hiring of minorities in the industry. He directed the 1971 film The Strange Monster of Strawberry Cove. During the 1970s, he began an association with producers Bud Yorkin and Norman Lear, directing episodes from two of their projects in the 1970s, the series Sanford and Son and The Jeffersons (110 episodes for the latter). Among his other credits include The Waltons, Silver Spoons (91 episodes), Growing Pains and Designing Women, the last earning him a second Primetime Emmy Award nomination. From 1997 until 2002, he served as president of the Directors Guild.

A lifelong Catholic, Shea was a co-founder, with his wife Patt and other prominent Catholics in the Hollywood entertainment community, of the Hollywood-based Catholics in Media Associates (CIMA), which he was also past president of. Shea and Patt Shea jointly received the CIMA Lifetime Achievement Award in 2002 from the organization of Catholic entertainment industry professionals, which celebrated its 20th anniversary in 2013. Shea was also a former member of the United States Conference of Catholic Bishops Committee for Communications.

=== Personal life and family ===
On January 2, 1954, Shea married the former Patricia C. Carmody, who, later known as Patt Shea, became a three-time Humanitas Award-nominated screenwriter whose credits include the CBS-TV series All in the Family, story editor and/or writer for 38 episodes of Archie Bunker's Place, in addition to screenwriter for episodes of Lou Grant, Valerie, Cagney & Lacey, In The Heat of The Night, Bagdad Café, and the CBS pilot for Gloria, Sally Struthers’ spin-off from the popular All In The Family TV series, among many other television series. The couple, who resided in Studio City, CA for over 30 years, have five children, three of whom are currently DGA members* and 1st Assistant Directors*: Shawn Shea*; Elizabeth (now deceased); William (“Bill”) Shea*; Michael J. Shea* and John Francis (“Jay”) Shea III.

== Death ==
Shea died of complications from Alzheimer's disease.
