= An Elephant Makes Love to a Pig =

- South Park episode
- Episode no.: Season 1 Episode 5
- Directed by: Trey Parker (uncredited)
- Written by: Trey Parker; Matt Stone; Dan Sterling
- Production code: 105
- Original air date: September 10, 1997

Episode chronology
← Previous "Big Gay Al's Big Gay Boat Ride"	Next → "Death"
- South Park season 1

"An Elephant Makes Love to a Pig" is the fifth episode of the first season of the American animated television series South Park. It first aired on Comedy Central in the United States on September 10, 1997. In the episode, the boys of South Park try to force Kyle Broflovski's pet elephant to crossbreed with Eric Cartman's pet pig for a class project on genetic engineering. Meanwhile, Stan Marsh tries to deal with his elder sister Shelley, who keeps beating him up.

This episode was written by series creators Trey Parker and Matt Stone along with Dan Sterling. "An Elephant Makes Love to a Pig" episode served as both a parody of genetic engineering and a statement against its potential evils. The scenes of Stan getting beat up by his sister were inspired by Parker's real-life childhood experiences with his own sister, who is also named Shelley.

"An Elephant Makes Love to a Pig" was met with generally positive reviews, and has been described as one of the most popular early South Park episodes. Several commentators praised its satirical elements with regard to genetic engineering. The episode marked the first appearance of Shelley Marsh, Stan's mother Sharon Marsh (at the time named Carol), the mad scientist Dr. Alphonse Mephesto, who was inspired by the title character of the 1996 film, The Island of Dr. Moreau, as well as revealing that Randy the geologist from the earlier episode "Volcano" is Stan's father.

== Plot ==
The boys are waiting at the bus stop when Eric Cartman notices Stan Marsh has a black eye and it turns out his elder sister Shelley has been beating him up, all because she got new headgear at the dentist. Kyle Broflovski has problems of his own; his mother Sheila will not let him keep his new pet elephant in the house. At school, Mr. Hat teaches the class about genetic engineering, which prompts Kyle to decide to crossbreed his elephant with Cartman's pot-bellied pig, Fluffy, to make little "pot-bellied elephants", which he could keep in his house. Upon hearing this, Terrance Mephesto bets Kyle that he can clone a whole person before Kyle can create a pot-bellied elephant. Their teacher Mr. Garrison suggests the boys use their genetic modifications for the upcoming science fair and go to the South Park Genetic Engineering Ranch.

At the ranch, Dr. Alphonse Mephesto shows them his genetically engineered collection, including several different animals with four pairs of buttocks, such as a monkey, ostrich and mongoose. Mephesto then explains that, just like the Loverboy song says, "pig and elephant DNA just won't splice", and steals a blood sample from Stan and the boys leave. At school the boys learn Terrance has cloned a human foot. The boys go to Chef with their genetic engineering problem, and after he too cites the Loverboy song, he gives them the idea to try to have the animals "make sweet love" to breed.

Meanwhile, back at the ranch, Mephesto and his assistant Kevin have created a human clone of Stan for Terrance. The boys attempt to get the pig and the elephant drunk and to mate, but it does not seem to be working until Chef stops by and sings to the animals with a little help from Elton John. The cloned Stan breaks free from Mephesto's ranch and proceeds to terrorize the town. The boys eventually find the clone and take it to Stan's house and convince it to attack Shelley; however she easily defeats it and the clone decides to destroy the house and indirectly kills Kenny McCormick, by flinging him into a microwave, with a chair. Mephesto shows up and shoots the clone, but Stan is afraid he will be in trouble for everything the clone did. However, in a brief moment of kindness, Shelley takes the blame, after which she beats up Stan.

When the science projects are due, Terrance presents a monkey with five pairs of buttocks, known as the "Five-Assed Monkey", but Kyle has nothing until the pig gives birth to a pot-bellied pig that looks like Mr. Garrison, implying the pig was impregnated by Mr. Garrison before the elephant. Garrison quickly awards it first prize over Terrance's monkey.

== Production ==
"An Elephant Makes Love to a Pig" was written by show creators Trey Parker and Matt Stone, and Dan Sterling. It first aired on September 10, 1997, in the United States on Comedy Central. Parker and Stone intended to call this episode "An Elephant Fucks a Pig", but changed the title under pressure from Comedy Central. The network also made them cut a scene in which Shelley sets Stan on fire, to keep the show from coming under the same controversy for showing dangerous acts that can easily be imitated as MTV's Beavis and Butt-Head and later, MTV's Jackass. On early reruns of "An Elephant Makes Love to a Pig", water under Stan would appear without an explanation. It was until later when South Park was re-released in HD when the water under Stan was removed. It was during the writing of this episode that Parker and Stone decided Kyle would be the good student and "school-smarter than the other kids".

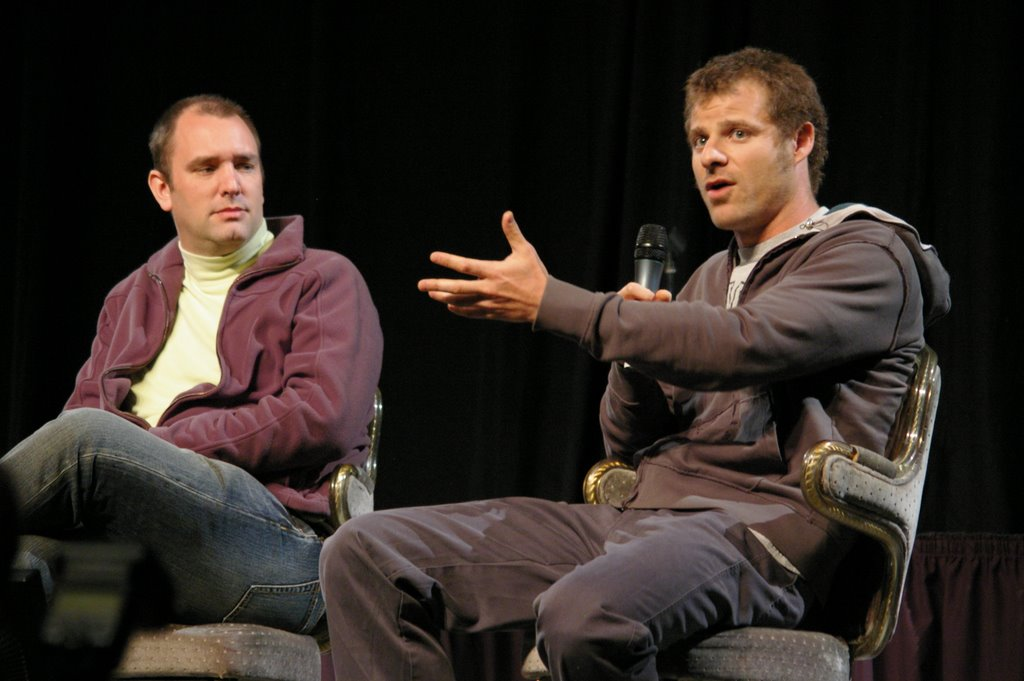
South Park co-creators Trey Parker and Matt Stone wrote "An Elephant Makes Love to a Pig"

The subplot with Stan getting beat up by his sister Shelley came from Parker's real-life experiences getting beat up as a child by his sister, also named Shelley, who is three years his elder. Parker said although his sister would later deny it, she regularly beat him up or locked him out of the house for hours. He stated that the scene when Stan says "You're my sister and I love you" in order to try to avoid a beating, but was subsequently beat even harder, was based on an actual experience with his sister. A scene in which Stan asks the giant mutant Stan to attack Shelley is based on Parker's childhood fantasy of having a larger version of himself beat up his sister. The resolution to the subplot, in which Shelley takes the blame for Stan's mistakes, and then beats up Stan when he tries to thank her, was also based on experiences Parker had when his sister would bail him out of trouble.

The dialogue spoken by the giant mutant Stan was performed by Parker and Stone. According to Parker and Stone, the character could only say phrases like "Bubba chop, bubba chewy chomp", and both men took turns voicing mutant Stan to sound the same way. Isaac Hayes, who does the voice of Chef, recorded all his lines via phone from New York City. Parker and Stone said they were nervous to ask him to repeat the line, "Now I know how all those white women felt", but he had no problem repeating it. The genetic mutations Dr. Mephesto creates, including the animals with multiple asses and the goldfish with bunny ears, were inspired by things Parker drew during high school.

The scene in the cafeteria, in which the four boys are annoyed by Pip Pirrup, is a cut scene from the original version of the South Park pilot, "Cartman Gets an Anal Probe". As such, the animation in that individual scene is actually traditional paper cutout stop motion, while the animation throughout the rest of the episode is done with computers. In order to illustrate the aftermath after the destruction scenes, Parker and Stone smudged the paper sets with their fingerprints and stains to make them look like scorch burns.

== Cultural references ==
The Baltimore Sun writer Tamara Ikenberg equated the episode as both a parody of genetic engineering and a statement against its potential evils, particularly through its portrayal of the giant mutant Stan wreaking havoc through South Park. This episode marked the first appearances of the characters Shelley and Sharon Marsh, Stan's elder sister and mother respectively, as well as that of Dr. Mephesto. Dr. Mephesto is based on Marlon Brando's character Dr. Moreau in the 1996 film, The Island of Dr. Moreau, which is based on the 1896 H. G. Wells novel of the same name. Mephesto is named after Mephistopheles, the demon in the Faust legend. Kevin, the companion of Dr. Mephesto, is based on the small creature who resembles and dresses like a miniature version of Brando's character in the film.

Elton John, the English singer and songwriter, appears as a guest vocalist for Chef's song, in one of the earliest celebrity spoof appearances on South Park. Trey Parker, who provided the voice for Elton John, said many people thought it was the actual John singing because his impression was so accurate. In another musical reference featured in the episode, several characters claim the real-life Canadian rock group Loverboy wrote a song about the fact that the DNA of an elephant and pig will not splice. "An Elephant Makes Love to a Pig" includes several pop cultural references to films and television shows. The last line in the episode, "That'll do pig", spoken by Cartman, is a reference to the final line of the 1995 film Babe, a movie about a talking pig, which Stone has described as one of his favorite films. When the boys try to tell police officer Barbrady about the clone, he suggests that the boys have seen too many episodes of The X-Files. In the scene in which Pip is introduced, Stan asks Pip about his peculiar name, but Cartman interrupts Pip during his answer. Pip's reply – "my father's family name being Pirrip and my Christian name Phillip, my infant tongue--" – is identical to the opening line of the Charles Dickens novel Great Expectations, which is narrated by its protagonist, Pip. The fourth season episode "Pip" is a parody and comedic retelling of the novel, and stars Pip, who assumes the role of his namesake.

== Reception ==
Several media outlets described "An Elephant Makes Love to a Pig" as one of the most popular early South Park episodes. Tom Carson of Newsday said it was the most outrageous South Park episode until "Mr. Hankey, the Christmas Poo" aired three months later. Many reviewers said the mere title demonstrated the crudeness and originality of South Park, then still a relatively new show. Chris Vognar of The Dallas Morning News said, "With episode titles such as, 'An Elephant Makes Love to a Pig,' suffice it to say there ain't much on the air like it."

Tamara Ikenberg of The Baltimore Sun said the episode demonstrated the show's ability to address ethically challenging issues like genetic engineering with an "imaginative, unconventional flair". Howard Rosenberg of the Los Angeles Times praised the episode, and said the bestiality hinted at in the final scene of the episode illustrated the outrageousness of the show, as well as the fact that the show would probably not be enjoyed by all audiences.

Rick Bentley of The Fresno Bee said the biggest laughs from the episode come from the song Chef sings to the elephant and pig. In 2008, Alicia Wade of the Daily Egyptian said the episode and its theme about genetic engineering still felt fresh more than 10 years after its original broadcast. In 2009, Travis Fickett from IGN rated the episode an 8.3 out of 10, and concluded, "It's a bit shocking, perhaps offensive to some, but in the context of murdering mutants and five-assed monkeys created by Brando parodies in Hawaiian moo-moos – it all makes perfect sense. And it's all quintessentially South Park."

== Home media ==
"An Elephant Makes Love to a Pig" was released, alongside five other episodes, in a three-set VHS on May 5, 1998, marking the first time South Park was made available on video. The episode was released on the "Volume III" video, along with "Death"; other featured episodes included "Cartman Gets an Anal Probe", "Volcano", "Weight Gain 4000" and "Big Gay Al's Big Gay Boat Ride". The episode was re-released by Warner Home Video in 2002, as part of the DVD box set South Park – The Complete First Season.

"Tonight is Right for Love", the song sung by Chef to encourage the elephant and pig to make love, is featured in the 1998 South Park soundtrack "Chef Aid: The South Park Album". In the track, rock singer Meat Loaf sings the song along with Isaac Hayes, the actor who voices Chef.

The distribution license for "An Elephant Makes Love to a Pig" was among six South Park episodes purchased in 2000 by the Pittsburgh-based company and website SightSound.com. The site made the episodes available for download $2.50 for a two-day download and $4.95 for a permanent copy. It was one of the first experiments with making television videos available for Internet download, making "An Elephant Makes Love to a Pig" one of the first of any television episode made legally available on the Internet.
