= Leonard Lightfoot =

American film and television actor

- Born: December 2, 1947 (age 78); Carlisle, Pennsylvania, U.S.
- Occupations: Film and television actor
- Years active: 1977–1997

Leonard Lightfoot (born December 2, 1947) is an American film and television actor. He is known for playing the attorney Leonard Rollins in the first season of the television sitcom series Silver Spoons. He also played Dep. Alvin Wiggins in the sitcom television series She's the Sheriff and Detective Henderson in Murder, She Wrote.

Lightfoot guest-starred in television programs including Seinfeld, Married... with Children, Quantum Leap, Diff'rent Strokes and The Pretender. He also appeared in three episodes of The Jeffersons as Officer Barrett.

== Filmography ==
=== Film ===
| Year | Title | Role | Notes |
|---|---|---|---|
| 1977 | Tentacles | Deputy | |
| 1981 | Cutter's Way | Black #3 | |
| 1984 | Summer Fantasy | Smitty | TV movie |
| 1986 | The Check Is In the Mail... | Burglar #1 | |
| 1987 | Open House | TJ | |
| 1995 | Virus | Attendant | |
| 1995 | Captain Nuke and the Bomber Boys | Warehouse Worker | |

=== Television ===
| Year | Title | Role | Notes |
|---|---|---|---|
| 1979 | The White Shadow | Teacher | 2 episodes |
| 1979 | The Incredible Hulk | Brubeck | 1 episode |
| 1980 | Buck Rogers in the 25th Century | Cirus | 1 episode |
| 1981 | The Brady Brides | Wayne Anderson | 1 episode |
| 1981–1982 | Hill Street Blues | Tibbs/Ellis | 4 episodes |
| 1981–1982 | The Jeffersons | Officer Barrett | 3 episodes |
| 1982 | The Greatest American Hero | Lieutenant | 1 episode |
| 1982 | Diff'rent Strokes | The Younger Cop | 1 episode |
| 1982–1983 | Silver Spoons | Leonard Rollins | 8 episodes |
| 1984–1985 | Gimme a Break! | Dr. Jamel Anderson/Louis | 2 episodes |
| 1986 | The New Mike Hammer | Ruben Washington | 1 episode |
| 1987 | What's Happening Now!! | Billy | 1 episode |
| 1987–1989 | She's the Sheriff | Dep. Alvin Wiggins | 45 episodes |
| 1987 | Roomies | Coach | 1 episode |
| 1990 | Married... with Children | Oliver | 1 episode |
| 1990 | Hunter | Lester Smith | 1 episode |
| 1991 | Quantum Leap | Officer Little | 1 episode |
| 1991 | Major Dad | Col. Bradshaw | 1 episode |
| 1992 | A Different World | Ted Selman | 1 episode |
| 1993–1994 | Murder, She Wrote | Detective Henderson | 5 episodes |
| 1996 | Seinfeld | Clyde | 1 episode |
| 1997 | The Pretender | Reb McElroy | 1 episode |
| 1997 | Brooklyn South | Det. Calvin Cox | 1 episode |
