= List of roles and awards of Trey Parker =

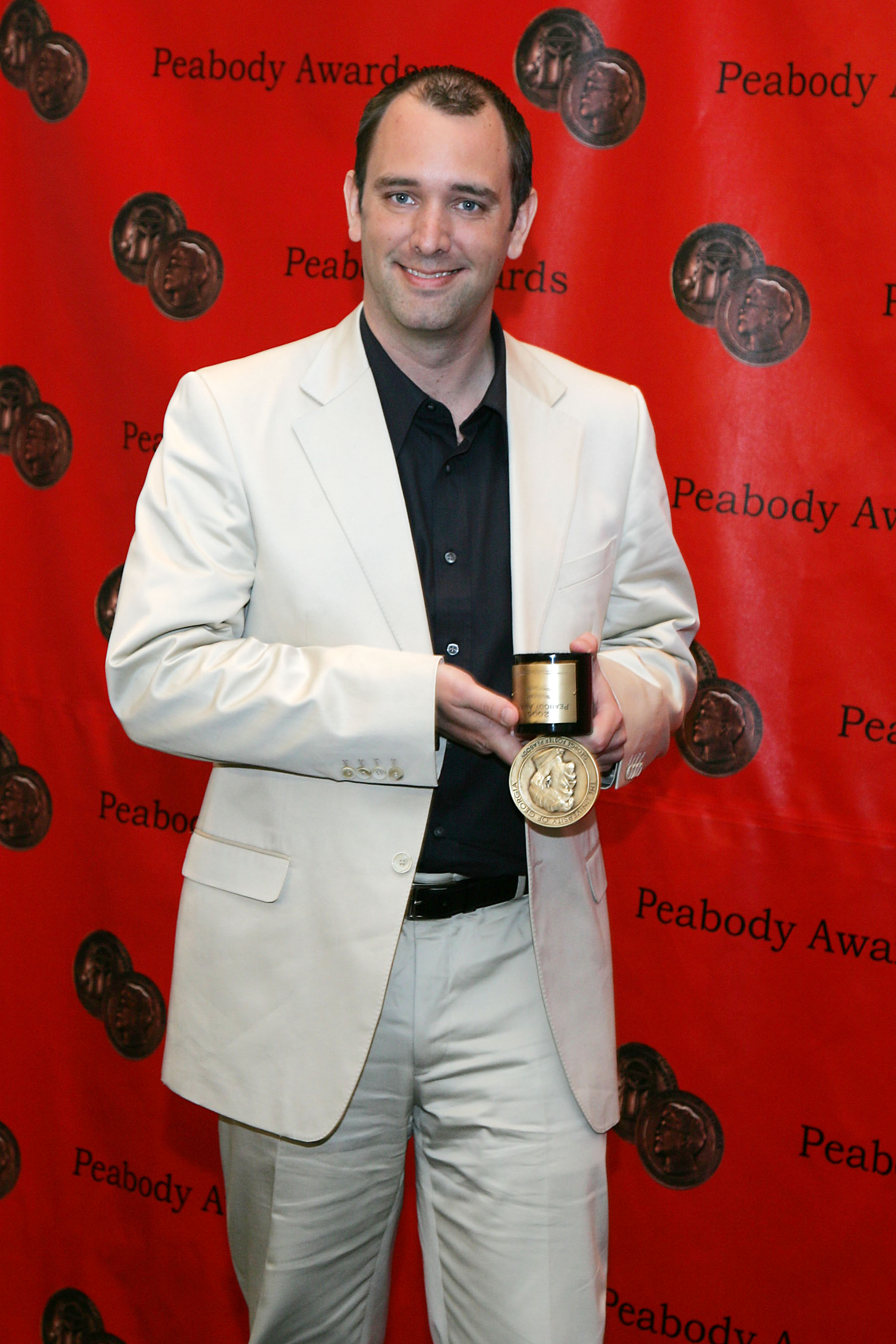
Parker at the Peabody Awards in 2006.

The following is the filmography of American animator, writer, producer, director, actor and songwriter Trey Parker.

== Film ==
Year	Title	Functioned as				Role	Notes	Ref(s)
Year	Title	Director	Writer	Producer	Actor	Role	Notes	Ref(s)
1992	American History	Yes	Yes	No	Yes	Various voices	Student film	
1992	Jesus vs. Frosty	Yes	Yes	Yes	Yes	Stan Marsh, Eric Cartman (voice)	Student film Also animator and editor	
1993	Cannibal! The Musical	Yes	Yes	Yes	Yes	Alfred Packer		
1995	Jesus vs. Santa	Yes	Yes	Yes	Yes	Stan Marsh, Eric Cartman (voice)	Short film Also animator and editor	
1995	Your Studio and You	Yes	Yes	No	Yes	Narrator (voice)	Short film	
1996	For Goodness Sake II	Yes	No	No	Yes	Interviewer	Short film	
1997	Orgazmo	Yes	Yes	Yes	Yes	Joe Young / Orgazmo	Also editor	
1998	BASEketball	No	No	No	Yes	Joe Cooper		
1999	South Park: Bigger, Longer & Uncut	Yes	Yes	Yes	Yes	Stan Marsh, Eric Cartman, Mr. Garrison, Randy Marsh, Various voices		
1999	Terror Firmer	No	No	No	Yes	Hermaphrodites	Uncredited	
1999	Revenge of the Roadkill Rabbit	No	No	No	Yes	Father Rabbit (voice)	Short film	
2002	Run Ronnie Run!	No	No	No	Yes	Himself	Cameo	
2004	Tales from the Crapper	No	No	No	Yes	Steve Keen		
2004	Team America: World Police	Yes	Yes	Yes	Yes	Gary Johnston, Joe, Carson, Kim Jong Il, Various voices		
2005	The Aristocrats	No	No	No	Yes	Eric Cartman (voice)	Cameo	
2015	A Lego Brickumentary	No	No	No	Yes	Himself	Documentary	
2017	Despicable Me 3	No	No	No	Yes	Balthazar Bratt (voice)		
2024	¡Casa Bonita Mi Amor!	No	No	No	Yes	Himself	Documentary	
2026	Minions & Monsters	No	No	No	Yes	Goomi (voice)		
TBA	Whitney Springs	Yes	TBA	Yes	TBA	N/A	Post-production	

== Television ==
Year	Title	Functioned as					Role	Notes	Ref(s)
Year	Title	Creator	Director	Writer	Producer	Actor	Role	Notes	Ref(s)
1997–present	South Park	Yes	Yes	Yes	Executive	Yes	Stan Marsh, Eric Cartman, Mr. Garrison, Randy Marsh, Various voices		
1997	19th CableACE Awards	No	No	No	No	Yes	Stan Marsh, Eric Cartman (voice)	TV special	
1997	The Tonight Show with Jay Leno	No	No	No	No	Yes	Stan Marsh, Eric Cartman, Mr. Garrison (voice)	Episode: "5.203"	
1999	Python Night – 30 Years of Monty Python	No	No	No	No	Yes	Himself / Eric Cartman (voice)	TV special	
2000	2000 MTV Movie Awards	No	No	No	No	Yes	Stan Marsh, Eric Cartman, Various voices	TV special	
2001	That's My Bush!	Yes	No	Yes	Executive	No	None	8 episodes	
2001	Princess	Yes	Yes	Yes	Executive	Yes	Husband (voice)	2 episodes	
2006	58th Primetime Emmy Awards	No	No	No	No	Yes	Stan Marsh, Randy Marsh (voice)	TV special	
2007–2008	Kenny vs. Spenny	No	No	No	Executive	No	None	10 episodes	
2009	How's Your News?	No	No	No	Executive	No	None	6 episodes	
2012	2012 Spike Video Game Awards	No	No	No	No	Yes	Eric Cartman (voice)	TV special	
2018	The Shivering Truth	No	No	No	No	Yes	Various voices	2 episodes	
2020	Sassy Justice	Yes	Yes	Yes	Executive	Yes	Al Gore	Pilot	
2022	South Park: The 25th Anniversary Concert	No	No	No	No	Yes	Himself	TV special	

== Theatre ==
Year	Title	Director	Writer	Music	Actor	Role	Notes	Ref(s)
2011	The Book of Mormon	Yes (Note: Co-director with Casey Nicholaw)	Yes	Yes (Note: Co-author, co-composer and co-lyricist with Robert Lopez and Matt Stone)	Yes (Note: 15th Anniversary Special Performances)	Jesus Christ		

== Video games ==
Title	Year	Director	Writer	Actor	Role	Ref(s)
1998	South Park	No	No	Yes	Stan Marsh, Eric Cartman, Mr. Garrison, Various voices	
1999	South Park: Chef's Luv Shack	No	No	Yes	Stan Marsh, Eric Cartman, Various voices	
1999	South Park Rally	No	No	Yes	Stan Marsh, Eric Cartman, Mr. Garrison, Various voices	
2009	South Park Let's Go Tower Defense Play!	No	No	Yes	Stan Marsh, Eric Cartman, Randy Marsh, Jimmy Valmer Various voices	
2012	South Park: Tenorman's Revenge	No	No	Yes	Stan Marsh, Eric Cartman, Various voices	
2014	South Park: The Stick of Truth	No	Yes	Yes	Stan Marsh, Eric Cartman, Mr. Garrison, Randy Marsh, Jimmy Valmer, Various voices	
2017	South Park: The Fractured but Whole	Yes	Yes	Yes	Stan Marsh, Eric Cartman, Randy Marsh, Jimmy Valmer, Various voices	
2017	South Park: Phone Destroyer	Yes	Yes	Yes	Stan Marsh, Eric Cartman, Mr. Garrison, Randy Marsh, Jimmy Valmer, Various voices	
2024	South Park: Snow Day!	No	Yes	Yes	Stan Marsh, Eric Cartman, Randy Marsh, Jimmy Valmer, Various voices	
2026	Fortnite Battle Royale	No	No	Yes	Stan Marsh, Eric Cartman, Bus Driver	

== Music videos ==
Title	Performer(s)	Director(s)	Album	Year	Ref.
"Even If You Don't"	Ween	Trey Parker; Matt Stone	White Pepper	2000	

== Awards and nominations ==
Awards and nominations of Trey Parker
Title	Year (Note: Refers to the year in which the ceremony was held.)	Award	Category	Result	Ref(s)
American History	1993	Student Academy Award	Animation – Silver Medal	Won	
Jesus vs. Santa	1997	Florida Film Festival	Best Short	Won	
South Park	1997	CableACE Award	Animated Programming Special or Series	Won	
South Park	1997	Environmental Media Awards	Best Television Episodic Comedy for "Volcano"	Nominated	
Jesus vs. Santa	1997	Los Angeles Film Critics Association	Best Animated Film	Won	
South Park	1998	Producers Guild of America Award	Most Promising Producer in Television	Won	
South Park	1998	GLAAD Media Award	Outstanding Individual TV Episode for "Big Gay Al's Big Gay Boat Ride"	Nominated	
South Park	1998	TCA Awards	Program of the Year	Nominated	
South Park	1998	TCA Awards	Outstanding New Program	Nominated	
South Park	1998	Primetime Emmy Award	Outstanding Animated Program for "Big Gay Al's Big Gay Boat Ride"	Nominated	
South Park	1998	Annie Awards	Outstanding Achievement in an Animated Primetime or Late Night Television Program	Nominated	
South Park	1999	Teen Choice Awards	Choice Comedy Series	Nominated	
South Park: Bigger, Longer & Uncut	1999	Los Angeles Film Critics Association	Best Music	Won	
South Park: Bigger, Longer & Uncut	1999	New York Film Critics Circle	Best Animated Film	Won	
South Park: Bigger, Longer & Uncut	1999	Annie Awards	Best Animated Feature	Nominated	
South Park: Bigger, Longer & Uncut	1999	Annie Awards	Best Writing in a Feature Production	Nominated	
South Park: Bigger, Longer & Uncut	2000	Satellite Awards	Best Animated or Mixed Media Feature	Nominated	
South Park: Bigger, Longer & Uncut	2000	Satellite Awards	Best Original Song for "Mountain Town"	Nominated	
South Park: Bigger, Longer & Uncut	2000	Chicago Film Critics Association	Best Original Score	Won	
South Park: Bigger, Longer & Uncut	2000	Academy Awards	Best Original Song for "Blame Canada"	Nominated	
South Park: Bigger, Longer & Uncut	2000	MTV Movie Awards	Best Original Score for "Uncle Fucka"	Won	
South Park	2000	Primetime Emmy Award	Outstanding Animated Program for "Chinpokomon"	Nominated	
South Park	2001	American Comedy Awards	Funniest Television Series – Animated	Nominated	
South Park	2002	Primetime Emmy Award	Outstanding Animated Program for "Osama Bin Laden Has Farty Pants"	Nominated	
South Park	2003	Santa Monica Film Festival & Moxie Awards	Maverick Filmmakers Award	Won	
South Park	2004	Primetime Emmy Award	Outstanding Animated Program for "It's Christmas in Canada"	Nominated	
Team America: World Police	2005	People's Choice Awards	Favorite Animated Movie	Nominated	
Team America: World Police	2005	Online Film Critics Society	Best Animated Film	Nominated	
Team America: World Police	2005	Satellite Awards	Best Animated or Mixed Media Feature	Nominated	
Team America: World Police	2005	MTV Movie Awards	Best Action Sequence	Nominated	
Team America: World Police	2005	Teen Choice Awards	Choice Movie: Comedy: Animated/Computer Generated	Nominated	
South Park	2005	Primetime Emmy Award	Outstanding Animated Program for "Best Friends Forever"	Won	
South Park	2005	Satellite Awards	Outstanding DVD Release of a Television Show	Nominated	
Team America: World Police	2006	Empire Awards	Best Comedy	Won	
South Park	2006	Peabody Award		Won	
South Park	2006	Teen Choice Awards	Choice Animated Series	Nominated	
South Park	2006	Primetime Emmy Award	Outstanding Animated Program for "Trapped in the Closet"	Nominated	
South Park	2007	American Film Institute Awards	TV Program of the Year	Won	
South Park	2007	Teen Choice Awards	Choice Animated Series	Nominated	
South Park	2007	Primetime Emmy Award	Outstanding Animated Program for "Make Love, Not Warcraft"	Won	
Kenny vs. Spenny	2008	Gemini Awards	Best Comedy Program or Series	Nominated	
South Park	2008	Teen Choice Awards	Choice Animated Series	Nominated	
South Park	2008	Primetime Emmy Award	Outstanding Animated Program for "Imaginationland"	Won	
South Park	2009	People's Choice Awards	Favorite Animated Comedy	Nominated	
South Park	2009	Teen Choice Awards	Choice Animated Series	Nominated	
South Park	2009	Primetime Emmy Award	Outstanding Animated Program for "Margaritaville"	Won	
South Park Let's Go Tower Defense Play!	2009	Spike Video Game Awards	Best Game Based On A Movie/TV Show	Won	
South Park Let's Go Tower Defense Play!	2009	Spike Video Game Awards	Best Cast	Nominated	
South Park	2010	Teen Choice Awards	Choice Animated Series	Nominated	
South Park	2010	Primetime Emmy Award	Outstanding Animated Program for "200"/"201"	Nominated	
South Park	2011	The Comedy Awards	Best Animated Comedy Series	Won	
The Book of Mormon	2011	Drama Desk Awards	Outstanding Musical	Won	
The Book of Mormon	2011	Drama Desk Awards	Outstanding Director of a Musical	Won	
The Book of Mormon	2011	Drama Desk Awards	Outstanding Book of a Musical	Nominated	
The Book of Mormon	2011	Drama Desk Awards	Outstanding Music	Won	
The Book of Mormon	2011	Drama Desk Awards	Outstanding Lyrics	Won	
The Book of Mormon	2011	New York Drama Critics' Circle	Best Musical	Won	
The Book of Mormon	2011	Outer Critics Circle Awards	New Broadway Musical	Won	
The Book of Mormon	2011	Outer Critics Circle Awards	Outstanding Director of a Musical	Won	
The Book of Mormon	2011	Outer Critics Circle Awards	Outstanding New Score	Won	
The Book of Mormon	2011	Tony Award	Best Musical	Won	
The Book of Mormon	2011	Tony Award	Best Direction of a Musical	Won	
The Book of Mormon	2011	Tony Award	Best Book of a Musical	Won	
The Book of Mormon	2011	Tony Award	Best Original Score	Won	
South Park	2011	Primetime Emmy Award	Outstanding Animated Program for "Crack Baby Athletic Association"	Nominated	
The Book of Mormon	2012	Grammy Award	Best Musical Theater Album	Won	
South Park	2012	The Comedy Awards	Best Animated Comedy Series	Nominated	
South Park: The Stick of Truth	2012	Game Critics Awards	Best Role Playing Game	Won	
South Park: The Stick of Truth	2012	Spike Video Game Awards	Most Anticipated Game	Nominated	
	2012	Britannia Awards	Charlie Chaplin Britannia Award for Excellence in Comedy	Honored	
South Park	2013	Annie Awards	Best General Audience Animated TV/Broadcast Production for "Raising the Bar"	Nominated	
South Park	2013	Annie Awards	Best Writing in an Animated Television or Other Broadcast Venue Production for "Jewpacabra"	Won	
South Park	2013	Primetime Emmy Award	Outstanding Animated Program for "Raising the Bar"	Won	
The Book of Mormon	2013	Evening Standard Theatre Awards	Best Musical	Nominated	
The Book of Mormon	2013	Evening Standard Theatre Awards	Best Night Out	Won	
South Park: The Stick of Truth	2013	VGX Award	Most Anticipated Game	Nominated	
South Park	2014	TCA Awards	TCA Heritage Award	Nominated	
South Park	2014	Primetime Emmy Award	Outstanding Animated Program for "Black Friday"	Nominated	
South Park: The Stick of Truth	2014	Golden Joystick Award	Game of the Year	Nominated	
South Park: The Stick of Truth	2014	Golden Joystick Award	Best Storytelling	Nominated	
The Book of Mormon	2014	WhatsOnStage Awards	Best New Musical	Won	
The Book of Mormon	2014	Laurence Olivier Award	Best New Musical	Won	
The Book of Mormon	2014	Laurence Olivier Award	Outstanding Achievement in Music	Nominated	
South Park: The Stick of Truth	2014	The Game Awards	Best Best Role-Playing Game	Nominated	
South Park: The Stick of Truth	2014	The Game Awards	Best Narrative	Nominated	
South Park: The Stick of Truth	2014	The Game Awards	Best Performance	Won	
South Park	2015	People's Choice Awards	Favorite Animated TV Show	Nominated	
South Park	2015	Critics' Choice Television Award	Best Animated Series	Nominated	
South Park: The Stick of Truth	2015	D.I.C.E. Awards	Outstanding Achievement in Story	Nominated	
South Park	2015	Primetime Emmy Award	Outstanding Animated Program for "Freemium Isn't Free"	Nominated	
South Park	2016	People's Choice Awards	Favorite Animated TV Show	Nominated	
South Park	2016	Critics' Choice Television Award	Best Animated Series	Nominated	
South Park	2016	Primetime Emmy Award	Outstanding Animated Program for "You're Not Yelping"	Nominated	
South Park	2016	Primetime Emmy Award	Outstanding Character Voice-Over Performance	Nominated	
South Park	2016	Critics' Choice Television Award	Best Animated Series	Nominated	
South Park	2017	People's Choice Awards	Favorite Animated TV Show	Nominated	
The Book of Mormon	2017	Helpmann Awards	Best Musical	Won	
The Book of Mormon	2017	Helpmann Awards	Best Direction of a Musical	Won	
The Book of Mormon	2017	Helpmann Awards	Best Original Score	Nominated	
South Park	2017	Primetime Emmy Award	Outstanding Animated Program for "Member Berries"	Nominated	
South Park: The Fractured but Whole	2017	The Game Awards	Best Best Role-Playing Game	Nominated	
South Park	2018	Primetime Emmy Award	Outstanding Animated Program for "Put It Down"	Nominated	
South Park	2019	Critics' Choice Television Award	Best Animated Series	Nominated	
South Park	2021	Dorian TV Award	Best Animated Show	Nominated	
South Park	2021	Primetime Emmy Award	Outstanding Animated Program for "The Pandemic Special"	Nominated	
South Park	2022	Hollywood Critics Association TV Awards	Best Streaming Animated Series or TV Movie	Nominated	
South Park	2023	Dorian TV Award	Best Animated Show	Nominated	
South Park	2023	Astra Awards	Best Broadcast Network or Cable Animated Series or Television Movie	Won	
South Park	2024	Astra Awards	Best Animated Series or TV Movie	Nominated	
South Park	2025	Annie Awards	Best Mature Audience Animated Television/Broadcast Production for "South Park: The End of Obesity"	Nominated	
	2025	Inkpot Award	Excellence in Animation	Won	
South Park	2026	Critics' Choice Television Award	Best Animated Series	Won	
South Park	2026	Annie Awards	Best TV/Media – Mature for "Sermon on the 'Mount"	Nominated	
South Park	2026	Producers Guild of America Awards	Outstanding Producer of Episodic Television – Comedy	Nominated	
South Park	2026	Dorian TV Award	Best Animated Show	Won	
South Park	2026	TCA Awards	Outstanding Achievement in Animation	Nominated	
South Park	2026	Astra Awards	Best Animated Series	Nominated	
South Park	2026	Television Academy Honors Award		Honored	
	2026	Television Hall of Fame		Honored	
South Park	2026	Primetime Emmy Award	Outstanding Animated Program for "Sermon on the 'Mount"	Won	
South Park	2026	Primetime Emmy Award	Outstanding Character Voice-Over Performance	Nominated	
South Park	2026	Primetime Emmy Award	Outstanding Original Music and Lyrics for "Christian Woman"	Nominated	

In 2025, Parker and Stone would be recipients of the Inkpot Award at the annual San Diego Comic Con.

== See also ==
- List of roles and awards of Matt Stone
