= Princess (web series) =

Online animated series

Princess is a Flash animation series by Matt Stone and Trey Parker, the creators of South Park. The story follows a Lhasa Apso dog.

On March 21, 2000, Daily Variety reported that Parker and Stone were going to produce 39 shorts that were to be 3-5 minutes long, and would have full creative and artistic control of the series.

The animated short was originally produced with Macromedia Flash in 2001 and was meant to be showcased on Macromedia's sister-site Shockwave. Shockwave executives shelved the project after two episodes due to its crudeness.

Parker has stated that he and Stone would love to do more episodes if someone wanted to distribute them and has encouraged fans with Flash skills to continue the story themselves.

== Plot ==
=== Princess Hears a Strange Noise ===
Princess is awakened by a strange squishing sound. It is her owner Richard being manually masturbated by his wife. She is unsuccessful in bringing him to orgasm because he has taken a large dose of Viagra. After three hours of sexual activity, the woman begins performing fellatio. When the fellatio is unsuccessful, Richard plays a porn movie on the television. When the porn movie is unsuccessful, he changes the channel to a show about interior decorating featuring Christopher Lowell, at which point he reaches orgasm. The force from the hours of sexual activity causes the semen to fly right through her head, killing her in the process. The episode ends with the semen-covered dog sneezing as Richard asks her "What are we going to do?"

=== Princess Meets Officer Friendly ===
Later in the morning, as police officers survey the scene, the husband gives information about the crime scene to Officer Friendly, the man in charge of the investigation. Officer Friendly says this is the 18th case of the aforementioned incident since Viagra was introduced to the public. Richard then goes to inform his son, Tommy, about the wife. Meanwhile, a man claiming to be a coroner enters the house and asks for 20 minutes alone with the body. In reality, he is a necrophiliac, and performs anal sex on the corpse. Princess tries to tell Officer Friendly and his partner (a parody of the television show Lassie) but they assume the dog is in heat. Princess then enters Tommy's room where Richard unsuccessfully attempts to explain to his son what happened. Princess barks and Tommy thinks the dog is telling him to "see Mommy". The episode ends with Tommy opening his parents' bedroom door to find the necrophiliac engaged in sexual acts with his mother's corpse.

=== Princess Finds a Red Balloon ===
At the end of the "Officer Friendly" episode, the viewers are invited to see the next installment, "Princess Finds A Red Balloon". However, according to South Park Studios, the episode was never produced following the rejection of the first two.
