= The Book of Mormon: Original Broadway Cast Recording =

Album of the stage musical The Book of Mormon

Cast recording by Andrew Rannells, Josh Gad, Rory O'Malley, Nikki M. James, and Original Broadway Cast
- Released: May 17, 2011
- Recorded: March 21, 22 and 28, 2011 at MSR Studios (Studio A), (New York City)
- Genres: Showtunes, musical comedy
- Length: 67:54
- Label: Ghostlight Records
- Producers: Stephen Oremus, Trey Parker, Robert Lopez, Matt Stone, Anne Garefino, Scott Rudin and Kurt Deutsch (exec.)

The Book of Mormon: Original Broadway Cast Recording contains the songs from the American musical The Book of Mormon, with music, lyrics, and book by Trey Parker, Robert Lopez, and Matt Stone. It was recorded by the musical's original Broadway cast and released on May 17, 2011 to digital outlets. The album saw a physical release on June 7, 2011, in a deluxe package with liner notes provided by former The New York Times theatre critic Frank Rich, as well as full lyrics and a synopsis of the musical. The Book of Mormon was named best musical theater album at the 2012 Grammy Awards.

Parker, Lopez, and Stone wrote the musical progressively over a period of six years, beginning in 2004. The recording for the album took place over three days, with the orchestra recording for one and the cast recording for another. Stephen Oremus, Parker, Lopez, and Stone were the primary producers of the album. The Book of Mormon original cast recording was recorded at MSR Studios, Studio A in New York City. The record has received positive reviews.

The recording received substantial commercial success after its initial digital release broke iTunes Store records and the subsequent album made a relatively strong debut on the US Billboard 200 chart. After the show's success at the 2011 Tony Awards and an aggressive marketing campaign, the recording skyrocketed to number 3 on the chart and became the highest charting Broadway cast album in over four decades. A two-LP vinyl version was released in November 2016.

== Recording and post-production ==
The cast recording for The Book of Mormon was recorded on March 21, 22 and 28, 2011. The two former dates were shortly before the show officially opened and the latter was days afterward. The record was recorded at Studio A in MSR Studios (formerly Right Track Recording) in New York City. The show's creators, Trey Parker, Matt Stone, and Robert Lopez, served as producers for the album, as did The Book of Mormon producers Anne Garefino and Scott Rudin. In addition, Stephen Oremus (music director for Wicked) and Kurt Deutsch (co-founder of Sh-K-Boom Records, owner of Ghostlight Records) also served as producer and executive producer, respectively.

Because of payment schedules imposed by union rules, Broadway cast recordings are traditionally recorded over a single 15-hour day, with all instruments and vocals tracked together. In addition to reducing costs, this approach enables the singers to control the tempo of the songs. But according to Frank Filipetti, who both recorded and mixed the album, The Book of Mormon's complex vocal arrangements called for a different strategy in which the instrumental tracks were recorded first, followed by a separate day dedicated to the cast. Filipetti said that the arrangements had "vocal parts within vocal parts within vocal parts. Trying to do all of that with the principal singers, rhythm section, orchestra, all in two or three takes in an all-day session wasn’t going to work." He credited Oremus and drummer Sean McDaniel for being able to anticipate the singers' phrasing. Other mixing challenges included "creating enough air and clarity for all the vocalists while still maintaining the vibrancy of [Lopez's] orchestral arrangements", as well as dealing with the score's wide range of musical styles.

Oremus and Lopez were heavily involved in the orchestra recording, whereas Stone and Parker were more invested in the vocal session. According to Filipetti, their main concern was making sure the jokes were coming across. The album was recorded to Pro Tools allowing multiple tracks of recordings to be present in the final cut. Mixing and mastering were done in April at Filipetti's studio in West Nyack, New York. The album was mastered by Scott Hull. Filipetti set up Source Connect to enable the core producers—Oremus, Lopez, Parker and Stone—to listen in on the session in real time from Manhattan, with Skype providing an audio/video connection between the two locations.

== Track listing ==
All tracks are written by Trey Parker, Robert Lopez, Matt Stone.

No.	Title	Performer(s)	Length
1.	"Hello!"	Andrew Rannells, Josh Gad, Rory O'Malley, Scott Barnhardt, Justin Bohon, Kevin Duda, Clark Johnsen, Benjamin Schrader, Brian Sears, Jason Michael Snow, Lewis Cleale	2:51
2.	"Two By Two"	Andrew Rannells, Josh Gad, Rory O'Malley, Scott Barnhardt, Justin Bohon, Kevin Duda, Clark Johnsen, Benjamin Schrader, Brian Sears, Jason Michael Snow, Lewis Cleale	4:30
3.	"You and Me (But Mostly Me)"	Andrew Rannells, Josh Gad	2:41
4.	"Hasa Diga Eebowai"	Michael Potts, Andrew Rannells, Josh Gad, Michael James Scott, Lawrence Stallings, Rema Webb, Maia Nkenge Wilson, Tommar Wilson, Darlesia Cearcy, John Eric Parker, Ta'Rea Campbell, Tyson Jennette, Brian Tyree Henry	4:23
5.	"Turn It Off"	Rory O'Malley, Andrew Rannells, Josh Gad, Scott Barnhardt, Justin Bohon, Kevin Duda, Clark Johnsen, Benjamin Schrader, Brian Sears, Jason Michael Snow	5:00
6.	"I Am Here for You"	Andrew Rannells, Josh Gad	2:02
7.	"All-American Prophet"	Andrew Rannells, Josh Gad, Rory O'Malley, Scott Barnhardt, Justin Bohon, Kevin Duda, Clark Johnsen, Benjamin Schrader, Brian Sears, Jason Michael Snow, Lewis Cleale, Jared Gertner, Graham Bowen, Nick Spangler, Michael James Scott	6:12
8.	"Sal Tlay Ka Siti"	Nikki M. James	3:38
9.	"Man Up"	Josh Gad, Company	4:02
10.	"Making Things Up Again"	Josh Gad, Lewis Cleale, Nikki M. James, Rory O'Malley, Scott Barnhardt, Asmeret Gebremichael, John Eric Parker, Michael James Scott, Brian Sears, Rema Webb, Ensemble	4:16
11.	"Spooky Mormon Hell Dream"	Benjamin Schrader, Kevin Duda, Brian Tyree Henry, Maia Nkenge Wilson, Lewis Cleale, Andrew Rannells, Michael Potts, Ensemble	4:28
12.	"I Believe"	Andrew Rannells, Ensemble	4:42
13.	"Baptize Me"	Josh Gad, Nikki M. James	4:15
14.	"I Am Africa"	Rory O'Malley, Scott Barnhardt, Justin Bohon, Kevin Duda, Josh Gad, Clark Johnsen, Benjamin Schrader, Brian Sears, Jason Michael Snow	2:21
15.	"Joseph Smith American Moses"	Nikki M. James, Michael Potts, Michael James Scott, Lawrence Stallings, Rema Webb, Maia Nkenge Wilson, Tommar Wilson, Darlesia Cearcy, John Eric Parker, Ta'Rea Campbell, Tyson Jennette, Brian Tyree Henry	6:12
16.	"Tomorrow Is a Latter Day"	Andrew Rannells, Josh Gad, Nikki M. James, Company	6:02

=== Song parody sources ===
In the recording's liner notes, Frank Rich wrote that The Book of Mormon "scrupulously follows the old testament of Broadway circa 1945–1965, A.D., even while fondly spoofing it". He compares "I Believe” to “I Have Confidence” from The Sound of Music, the opening number "Hello!" to “The Telephone Hour” in Bye Bye Birdie, and “Turn It Off” to “I’ll Never Be Jealous Again” from The Pajama Game. Other songs, he writes, owe much to the parodies of Tom Lehrer.

Kristin Rawls, in her critique of the score, draws several parallels to other musicals. She also likens "I Believe" to "I Have Confidence" from The Sound of Music, citing similarities in their lyrics, and makes a comparison between the Ugandans' version and presentation of Joseph Smith's story in "Joseph Smith American Moses" to "Uncle Tom's Cabin" from The King and I, as well as the recalling and overlap of previous numbers in "Man Up" to Les Misérables's "One Day More".

== Release ==
As the audio was being mixed, the musical's popularity exploded, giving the show a much higher profile than when the album was first recorded. The cast album was promoted through advertisements running during Parker and Stone's South Park on Comedy Central. A free preview of the entire recording was released on NPR starting on May 9, 2011. Excerpts from the cast recording are featured in an extended Fresh Air interview.

=== Commercial performance ===
During its first week of its iTunes Store release, the recording became "the fastest-selling Broadway cast album in iTunes history", according to representatives for the production, ranking No. 2 on its day of release on the iTunes Top 10 Chart. According to Playbill, "It's a rare occurrence for a Broadway cast album to place among the iTunes best sellers. The cast album for the Green Day musical American Idiot also ranked among the top 10 when it debuted in 2010." The album debuted at number 31 on the US Billboard 200 chart, with first-week sales of 13,000. The start for The Book of Mormon was also the best debut sales week for a cast set since The Little Mermaid cast album in 2008. The cast album also started at No. 1 on the Top Cast Albums chart – the 24th topper since the list began in 2006. After its initial success, the record fell to number 124 on the Billboard 200 with only 4,000 copies sold, and soon fell off the chart.

However, after the show's success at the 2011 Tony Awards, The Book of Mormon cast album broke sales records again when it skyrocketed up the Billboard charts back to number 3 on the Billboard 200 on June 15, making it the highest charting Broadway cast album–and first top 10–since 1969, when Hair spent 13 straight weeks at No. 1. It sold over 61,000 copies, the largest sales week for any cast album since Nielsen SoundScan began tracking data in 1991. The previous best sales week for a cast set belonged to the original London cast recording of Highlights from The Phantom of the Opera, which sold 54,000 over the Christmas week of 1992. Many news outlets attributed its chart success not only to its physical release on June 7 and publicity from the Tony Awards, but to Amazon MP3's sale pricing of the digital album. The retailer offered it at just $1.99 for three days during the sales tracking week that ended on Sunday (the night of the Tony broadcast). Amazon MP3 promoted the record aggressively through Twitter and through a commercial in the Tony Awards telecast. As a result, 85 percent of the sales were digital downloads, a much higher ratio than usual.

=== Critical reception ===
Matthew Perpetua of Rolling Stone complimented the recording's witty lyrics and memorable songs and stated the album would leave listeners "desperate to score tickets to see the actual show". David Jeffries of Allmusic stated that the music's style was vivid but traditional and the songs were "inspired" and provided a mixture of the "satirical, controversial, and the musical", but noted their coarse and blasphemic nature in his recommendation.

== Charts ==
Chart (2011)	Peak position
US Billboard 200 (Billboard)	3
US Cast Albums (Billboard)	1

=== Year-end charts ===
Chart (2011)	Peak position
US Cast Albums (Billboard)	1

Chart (2012)	Peak position
US Cast Albums (Billboard)	2

Chart (2013)	Peak position
US Cast Albums (Billboard)	2

Chart (2014)	Peak position
US Cast Albums (Billboard)	2

Chart (2015)	Peak position
US Cast Albums (Billboard)	3

Chart (2016)	Peak position
US Cast Albums (Billboard)	5

Chart (2017)	Peak position
US Cast Albums (Billboard)	9

Chart (2018)	Peak position
US Cast Albums (Billboard)	11

== Certifications ==
Region	Certification	Certified units/sales
United States (RIAA)	Gold	500,000^{‡}
^{‡} Sales+streaming figures based on certification alone.
