= Deep Voodoo =

Deepfake studio

- Shortened logo of Deep Voodoo

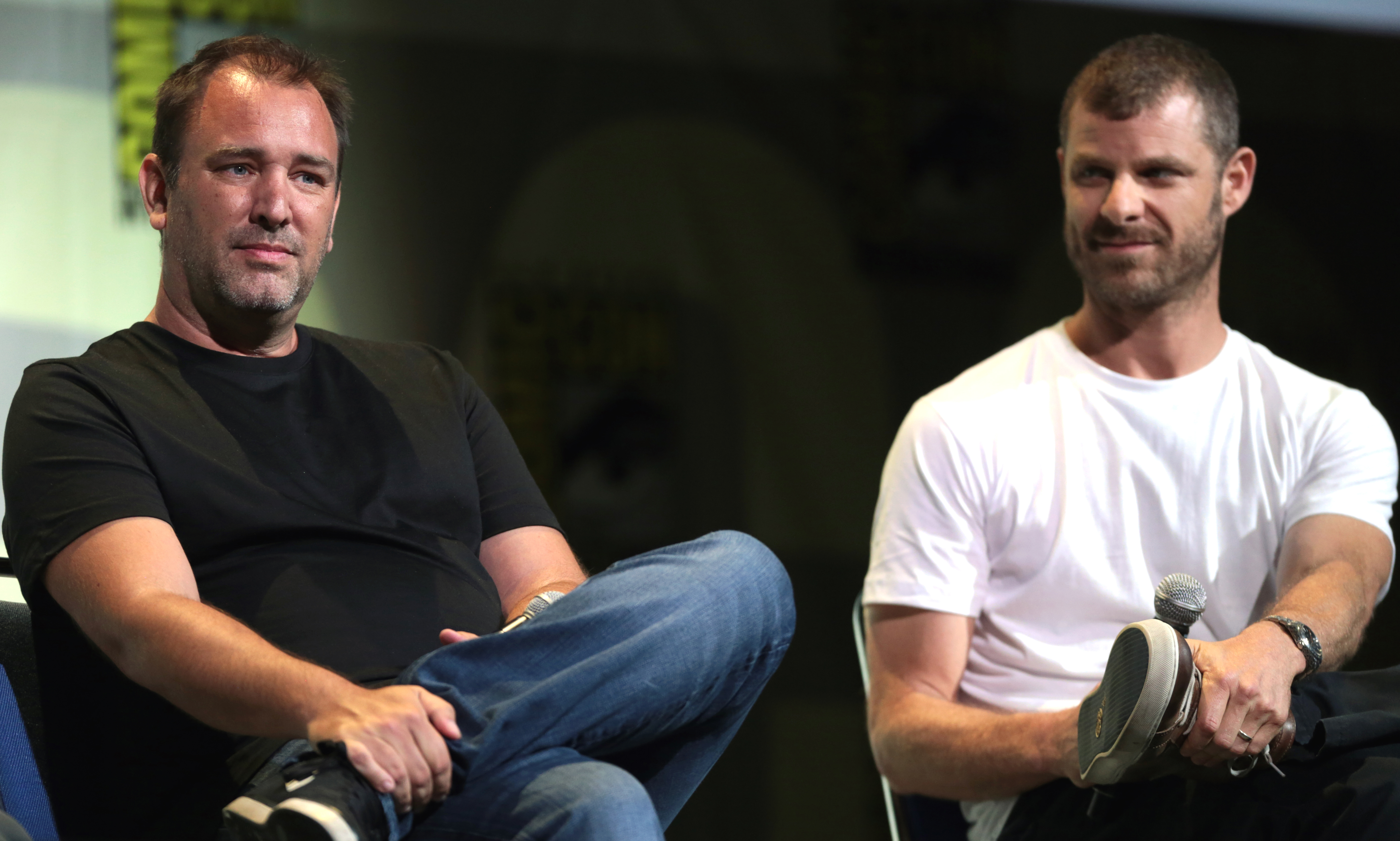
- South Park creators Trey Parker (left) and Matt Stone, the founders of Deep Voodoo.
- Type: Private
- Industry: Artificial intelligence
- Founded: 2020; 6 years ago
- Founders: Matt Stone; Trey Parker
- Key people: Afshin Beyzaee, CEO; Jennifer Howell, CCO
- Products: Deepfakes
- Services: Visual effects
- Website: deepvoodoo.com

Deep Voodoo is an artificial intelligence-based visual effects studio created by Matt Stone and Trey Parker in 2020. The studio utilizes deepfake technology to create hyperrealistic effects for entertainment purposes.

== History ==
Deep Voodoo was established in early 2020 after being spun out of Matt Stone and Trey Parker's independent entertainment company, Park County, to develop deepfake technology. The team, originally composed of more than twenty computer graphics artists, had been assembled for a film project that was interrupted due to the COVID-19 pandemic. Following this, the studio pivoted to creating deepfake tools for the entertainment industry.

In 2022, the studio raised $20 million in funding through Connect Ventures, an investment partnership between the Creative Artists Agency and New Enterprise Associates, a venture capital firm. Prior to this outside funding, Deep Voodoo was entirely funded by Trey Parker and Matt Stone's Park County.

== Projects ==
Deep Voodoo's first project was titled Sassy Justice, a parody of television investigative reports, which was done in collaboration with actor Peter Serafinowicz. The series was released in 2020 and was described by Trey Parker as "probably the single most expensive YouTube video ever made".

In 2022, Deep Voodoo made deepfakes for Kendrick Lamar, putting the faces of O.J. Simpson, Jussie Smollett, Nipsey Hussle, Kobe Bryant, and Kanye West on Kendrick for the music video for "The Heart Part 5". The video was the first in a partnership between Lamar's PGLang company and the South Park creator's Park County, which will produce a feature film for Paramount Pictures.

The studio was credited as a provider of visual effects on South Park's live-action depiction of Donald Trump in the first episode of season 27, "Sermon on the 'Mount". It also helped to create a music video for Billy Joel's song, "Turn the Lights Back On", where the artist is depicted playing the song at different at multiple ages in his life. Deep Voodoo's de-aging technology was used on the Apple TV series, Before, the music video for the Rolling Stones song, In the Stars, as well as the second season of the Peacock series, Ted.

Deep Voodoo was credited for its work on a Dunkin' Donuts advertisement featuring Ben Affleck, which aired during Super Bowl LX.
