= Blame Canada =

1999 single by Mary Kay Bergman and Trey Parker

Promotional single by Mary Kay Bergman and Trey Parker

from the album South Park: Bigger, Longer & Uncut
- Released: June 15, 1999
- Recorded: 1999
- Genre: Satire
- Length: 1:35
- Label: Atlantic
- Songwriters: Trey Parker and Marc Shaiman
- Producer: Darren Higman

Film clip
- "Blame Canada" from South Park: Bigger, Longer & Uncut on YouTube

"Blame Canada" is a satirical song from the 1999 animated film South Park: Bigger, Longer & Uncut, written by Trey Parker and Marc Shaiman. The song satirizes scapegoating and parents who fail to control "their children's consumption of popular culture", with the fictional South Park parents, led by Sheila Broflovski (Mary Kay Bergman), blaming the nation for children imitating the Terrance and Phillip film Asses of Fire.

"Blame Canada" was nominated for the Academy Award for Best Original Song at the 72nd Academy Awards. Parker and Matt Stone arrived at the ceremony in dresses previously worn by Jennifer Lopez and Gwyneth Paltrow, and later claimed to be under the influence of LSD while on the red carpet.

An 8-bit remix of the song appears in the 2014 game South Park: The Stick of Truth, included as one of the overworld themes for the Canada level. The song appears again in the game's 2017 sequel, South Park: The Fractured but Whole, near the Canadian wall.

Shaiman wrote new lyrics for the song in 2023 reflecting conspiracy theories about the Canadian wildfires that year.

Blame Canada was referenced in the 2025 teaser trailer for the twenty-seventh season of South Park.

== Reception ==
The song was nominated for the Academy Award for Best Original Song at the 72nd Academy Awards (1999). This created controversy because all nominated songs are traditionally performed during the Oscar broadcast, but the song contained the word fuck, which the FCC prohibits using in prime time broadcasts. At the awards ceremony, comedian Robin Williams performed the song with a chorus that gasped when the word was to be sung (Williams turned around at the crucial moment and did not actually sing it). He included digs at Margaret Trudeau and Bryan Adams, partially taken from lyrics of Sheila Broflovski's reprise of the song in "La Resistance". He referenced Celine Dion as well. Mary Kay Bergman, the voice actress who sang the female parts in the song, committed suicide months before the performance, forcing the organizers to search for a replacement for her and Trey Parker, who did the male voices. Williams introduced the song by speaking with duct tape over his mouth so that his speech resembled that of Kenny McCormick, then tearing it off and finally saying Stan Marsh's trademark line, "Oh my god! They killed Kenny!"

There was also some concern about the fact the song referred to well-known Canadian singer Anne Murray as a "bitch", but Murray indicated that she was not offended by the tongue-in-cheek lyric (Murray was invited to sing the song herself on the Oscar telecast but had to decline due to a prior commitment). When asked, the Canadian Consul General (and former prime minister) Kim Campbell said that she was not offended by the song since it was clearly a silly satirical piece and not intended to insult her country. This is made clear in the final line of the song:

We must blame them and cause a fuss.
Before somebody thinks of blaming us!

Coincidentally, the Canadian Oscar telecast in which Williams sang the song included the premiere of the Molson Canadian "I Am Canadian" rant advertisement, which counters many perceived Canadian stereotypes.

The song lost to Phil Collins' song "You'll Be in My Heart" from Tarzan, which was parodied on an episode of South Park released the following year, "Timmy 2000", as "You'll Be in Me".

== See also ==
- Anti-Canadian sentiment
- Moral panic

== Bibliography ==
- Johnson-Woods, Toni (2007). Blame Canada. New York: Continuum International Publishing Group. ISBN 978-0-8264-1731-2.
