= Santa Monica Film Festival & Moxie Awards =

American film festival and awards show

- Location: Santa Monica, California, United States
- Founded: 1996
- Disestablished: 2001
- Website: facebook.com/SantaMonicaFilm

The Santa Monica Film Festival & Moxie Awards is an annual film series and awards show held in Santa Monica, California, United States.

== History ==
The Santa Monica Film Festival & Moxie Awards was created by Albert Birdie deQuay, also known as Birdie deQuay, in 1997. In 2001, Birdie C Quay decided to focus exclusively on his activities with New Media Agency in Venice Beach, and handed all festival management activities to Dallas-based non-profit group Deep Ellum Film Festival, until it was later dissolved in 2003. Its unique format ran throughout the year screening films every third Thursday as part of their X Series at the Aero Theatre and the Laemmle Monica 4-Plex, both in Santa Monica. The films were voted on by the audiences, then later awarded the Moxie Award at an annual week-long award ceremony called the MOXIE Awards.

During the Moxie Awards, the Santa Monica Film Festival honored entertainers such as Ray Bradbury, (who attended the Sci-Fi themed ceremony on 2000), Ray Harryhausen and Forrest J. Ackerman.

The Under the Stars Summer Series included summer night film exhibitions at venues such as Bergamot Station and Santa Monica Pier. Films shown included classics such as “Nuovo Cinema Paradiso” and “Grease” projected in their original format. Proceeds went to benefit the Santa Monica Art Museum charity.

Past participating filmmakers included Spike Jonze, Gore Verbinski, Jason Reitman, Dennis Franz, and Joe Mantegna. The Santa Monica Film Festival and Moxie! Awards are no longer in operation.
