= Teen Choice Award for Choice Animated Series =

Entertainment award category

The following is a list of Teen Choice Award winners and nominees for Choice Animated Series. Family Guy receives the most wins with 6.

== Winners and nominees ==
=== 2000s ===
Year	Winner	Nominees	Ref.
2006	Family Guy	American Dad!; The Boondocks; King of the Hill; The Simpsons; South Park	
2007	The Simpsons	Aqua Teen Hunger Force; Family Guy; Lil' Bush; South Park	
2008	Family Guy	American Dad!; Aqua Teen Hunger Force; The Simpsons; South Park	
2009	SpongeBob SquarePants	American Dad!; Family Guy; The Simpsons; South Park	

=== 2010s ===
Year	Winner	Nominees	Ref.
2010	Family Guy	American Dad!; The Cleveland Show; South Park; Star Wars: The Clone Wars	
2011	The Simpsons	American Dad!; Bob's Burgers; The Cleveland Show; Family Guy	
2012	The Simpsons	Beavis and Butt-Head; Bob's Burgers; Family Guy; Robot Chicken	
2013	The Simpsons	Adventure Time; Bob's Burgers; Family Guy; Gravity Falls	
2014	The Simpsons	Adventure Time; Family Guy; Gravity Falls; Regular Show	
2015	Family Guy	Adventure Time; Gravity Falls; Regular Show; The Simpsons; Star Wars Rebels	
2016	Family Guy	Descendants: Wicked World; Gravity Falls; Over the Garden Wall; Steven Universe; The Simpsons	
2017	Family Guy	Bob's Burgers; Gravity Falls; Rick and Morty; Sonic Boom; Steven Universe	
2018	Miraculous: Tales of Ladybug & Cat Noir	Bob's Burgers; Family Guy; Rick and Morty; The Simpsons; Steven Universe	

== See also ==
- List of animation awards
