= Critics' Choice Television Award for Best Animated Series =

Television award

The Critics' Choice Television Award for Best Animated Series is one of the award categories presented annually by the Critics' Choice Television Awards (BTJA). It was introduced in 2012. The winners are selected by a group of television critics that are part of the Broadcast Television Critics Association.

== Winners and nominees ==
indicates the winner

=== 2010s ===
Year	Series	Network
2012	Archer	FX
2012	Adventure Time	Cartoon Network
2012	Bob's Burgers	Fox
2012	Family Guy	Fox
2012	Star Wars: The Clone Wars	Cartoon Network
2013	Archer	FX
2013	Adventure Time	Cartoon Network
2013	Phineas and Ferb	Disney Channel
2013	Regular Show	Cartoon Network
2013	The Simpsons	Fox
2013	Star Wars: The Clone Wars	Cartoon Network
2014	Archer	FX
2014	Adventure Time	Cartoon Network
2014	Bob's Burgers	Fox
2014	Family Guy	Fox
2014	Phineas and Ferb	Disney Channel
2014	The Simpsons	Fox
2015	Archer	FX
2015	Bob's Burgers	Fox
2015	Gravity Falls	Disney XD
2015	The Simpsons	Fox
2015	South Park	Comedy Central
2015	Star Wars Rebels	Disney XD
2016	BoJack Horseman	Netflix
2016	Bob's Burgers	Fox
2016	The Simpsons	Fox
2016	South Park	Comedy Central
2016	Star Wars Rebels	Disney XD
2017	BoJack Horseman	Netflix
2017	Archer	FX
2017	Bob's Burgers	Fox
2017	The Simpsons	Fox
2017	Son of Zorn	Fox
2017	South Park	Comedy Central
2018	Rick and Morty	Adult Swim
2018	Archer	FXX
2018	Bob's Burgers	Fox
2018	BoJack Horseman	Netflix
2018	Danger & Eggs	Amazon Prime Video
2018	The Simpsons	Fox
2019	BoJack Horseman	Netflix
2019	Adventure Time	Cartoon Network
2019	Archer	FXX
2019	Bob's Burgers	Fox
2019	The Simpsons	Fox
2019	South Park	Comedy Central

=== 2020s ===
Year	Series	Network
2020	BoJack Horseman	Netflix
2020	Big Mouth	Netflix
2020	The Dark Crystal: Age of Resistance	Netflix
2020	She-Ra and the Princesses of Power	Netflix
2020	The Simpsons	Fox
2020	Undone	Prime Video
2021 (Note: The award was presented at the 1st Critics' Choice Super Awards.)	BoJack Horseman	Netflix
2021	Archer	FXX
2021	Big Mouth	Netflix
2021	Central Park	Apple TV+
2021	Harley Quinn	HBO Max
2021	Rick and Morty	Adult Swim
2021	Star Trek: Lower Decks	CBS All Access
2022	What If...?	Disney+
2022	Big Mouth	Netflix
2022	Bluey	Disney Junior
2022	Bob's Burgers	Fox
2022	The Great North	Fox
2022	Q-Force	Netflix
2023	Harley Quinn	HBO Max
2023	Bluey	Disney+
2023	Bob's Burgers	Fox
2023	Genndy Tartakovsky's Primal	Adult Swim
2023	Star Trek: Lower Decks	Paramount+
2023	Undone	Prime Video
2024	Scott Pilgrim Takes Off	Netflix
2024	Bluey	Disney+
2024	Bob's Burgers	Fox
2024	Harley Quinn	Max
2024	Star Trek: Lower Decks	Paramount+
2024	Young Love	Max
2025	X-Men '97	Disney+
2025	Batman: Caped Crusader	Prime Video
2025	Bluey	Disney+
2025	Bob's Burgers	Fox
2025	Invincible	Prime Video
2025	The Simpsons	Fox
2026	South Park	Comedy Central
2026	Bob's Burgers	Fox
2026	Harley Quinn	HBO Max
2026	Long Story Short	Netflix
2026	Marvel Zombies	Disney+
2026	Your Friendly Neighborhood Spider-Man	Disney+

== Multiple wins ==
5 wins

- BoJack Horseman (2 consecutive, 3 consecutive)

4 wins

- Archer (consecutive)

== Multiple nominations ==
12 nominations

- Bob's Burgers

9 nominations

- The Simpsons

8 nominations

- Archer

6 nominations

- BoJack Horseman

5 nominations

- South Park

4 nominations

- Adventure Time
- Bluey
- Harley Quinn

3 nominations

- Big Mouth
- Star Trek: Lower Decks

2 nominations

- Family Guy
- Phineas and Ferb
- Rick and Morty
- Star Wars: The Clone Wars
- Star Wars Rebels
- Undone

== See also ==
- Annie Award for Best Animated Television Production
- Primetime Emmy Award for Outstanding Animated Program
