= Matt Stone =

American animator, filmmaker, songwriter and actor (born 1971)

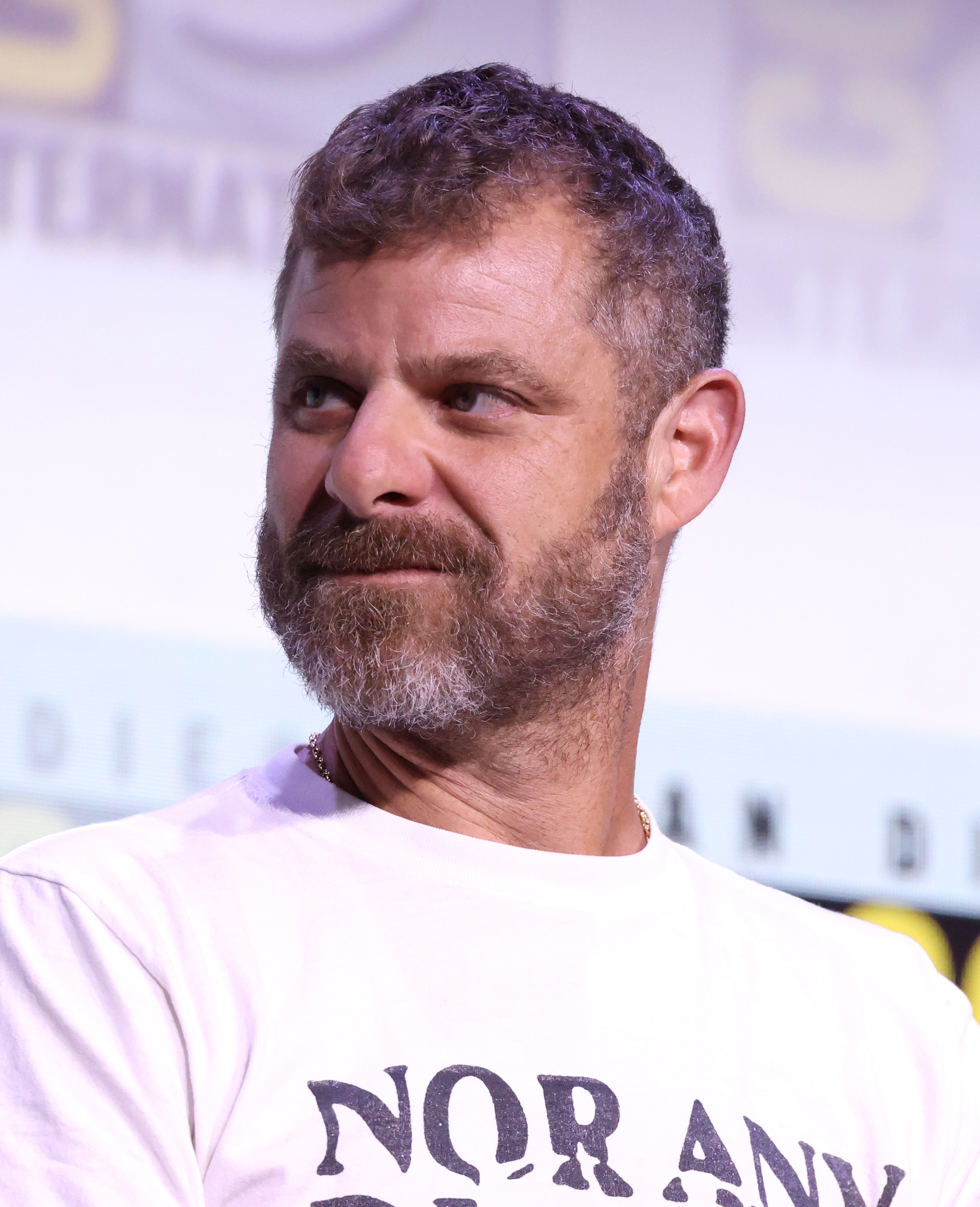
- Stone in 2025
- Born: Matthew Richard Stone; May 26, 1971 (age 55); Houston, Texas, U.S.
- Education: University of Colorado Boulder
- Occupations: Actor; animator; writer; producer; songwriter
- Years active: 1992–present
- Works: Filmography and awards
- Spouse: Angela Howard (m. 2008)
- Children: 2

Matthew Richard Stone (born May 26, 1971) is an American animator, filmmaker, songwriter and actor. He studied film and mathematics at the University of Colorado Boulder, where he met his creative partner Trey Parker. As students, they made the independent film Cannibal! The Musical (1993). They found fame with the animated satire South Park (since 1997) and the film South Park: Bigger, Longer & Uncut (1999). Their satirical action film Team America: World Police (2004) stars a cast of marionettes. With Robert Lopez, they co-created the musical The Book of Mormon (2011).

Stone is the recipient of numerous accolades, including five Primetime Emmy Awards and a Peabody for South Park and three Tony Awards and a Grammy Award for The Book of Mormon. In 2026, he was inducted into the Television Hall of Fame. The Colorado History Museum exhibited South Park: Handmade in Colorado from December 6, 2026, through October 3, 2027 that "traces the origins of the show and its creators, Colorado natives Matt Stone and Trey Parker."

== Early life ==
Matthew Richard Stone was born on May 26, 1971, in Houston, Texas, the son of Sheila Lois (née Belasco) and Gerald Whitney Stone Jr., an economist. He is of Irish-American heritage from his father's side and Jewish heritage from his mother's side. The South Park characters Gerald and Sheila Broflovski were named after them. Stone and his younger sister Rachel were raised in Littleton, Colorado, a Denver suburb, where they attended Heritage High School. He played drums, and early musical influences included Rush and The Police. He attended the University of Colorado Boulder. His father, fearing his son would "become a musician and a bum", insisted that he major in something "practical". Stone graduated with a double-major degree in mathematics and film in 1993. At CU, he met Trey Parker, and the pair bonded over anti-authoritarian ethos and love of Monty Python. They studied with the experimental filmmaker Stan Brakhage, whom they cast in their first feature film.

== Career ==
=== Beginnings ===
==== The Spirit of Christmas and Cannibal! The Musical (1992–1994) ====
In 1992, Parker, Stone, Jason McHugh and Ian Hardin founded a production company, Avenging Conscience, named for a film which the group hated. Its first production was The Spirit of Christmas (1992, referred to as Jesus vs. Frosty), a short pitting the religious figure against Frosty the Snowman. Observing the showdown are four foulmouthed friends who would feature in their later work.

The quartet created a three-minute trailer for a fictional film, Alfred Packer: The Musical. Alfred Packer, the "Colorado Cannibal", was a prospector convicted for consuming his companions during a harsh winter (the CU cafeteria is named for him). The trailer became a sensation among students and Virgil Grillo, the chairman and founder of the film department, convinced the quartet to expand it into a feature film. Parker was a longtime musical theater fan and dreamed of doing something in the genre. Stone had a "musical-deprived childhood" (aside from Fiddler on the Roof and Monty Python numbers) but Parker showed him the ropes. Parker, under the alias Juan Schwartz, starred, directed and co-produced, creating an Oklahoma!-style musical with ten original show tunes. The movie was shot on Loveland Pass as winter was ending, and the crew endured freezing weather. Filming locations included the Lake City, Colorado courthouse where Packer was tried. Stone and McHugh costarred, and Brakhage had a bit part.

Alferd Packer: The Musical premiered in Boulder, Colorado on October 31, 1993. The group submitted it to the Sundance Film Festival, which did not respond. Parker said he had a "vision" they needed to be at the festival, so the group rented out a conference room in a nearby hotel and put on their own screenings. MTV did a short news segment on The Big Picture about the film, and they made industry connections through the festival. The film was sold to Troma Entertainment in 1996, where it was retitled Cannibal! The Musical, and upon the duo's later success, it became their best-selling title. It has become a cult classic and adapted as a stage play by community theater groups and even high schools nationwide.

==== Your Studio and You and Orgazmo (1995–1997) ====
Following the succès de scandale' of Cannibal!, the group, sans Hardin, moved to Los Angeles. Upon arrival, they met a lawyer for the William Morris Agency who connected them with producer Scott Rudin. The duo acquired a lawyer, an agent and a script deal. Despite initially believing themselves to be on the verge of success, the duo struggled for several years. Stone slept on dirty laundry for upwards of a year because he could not afford a mattress. They unsuccessfully pitched a children's program, Time Warped, which would have involved fictionalized stories of historical figures, to Fox Kids. The trio created two separate pilots, spaced a year apart, and despite the approval of executive Pam Brady, the network disbanded Fox Kids.

David Zucker, who was a fan of Cannibal!, asked the duo to make a 15-minute film for a party celebrating Seagram's acquisition of Universal Studios. Due to miscommunication, they improvised much of the film an hour before it was shot. Your Studio and You is a spoof of 1950s educational films starring Sylvester Stallone, Demi Moore, Steven Spielberg and others. Parker recalled, "You could probably make a feature film out of the experience of making that movie because it was just two dudes from college suddenly directing Steven Spielberg."

Between shooting the pilots for Time Warped, Parker penned Orgazmo, about a Mormon missionary moonlighting as a porn star. When it entered production, half of the budget came from Kuki, a Japanese porn company which wanted to feature its performers in mainstream Western media. Independent distributor October Films purchased the film rights for one million dollars after its screening at the Toronto International Film Festival. The film received an NC-17 rating from the Motion Picture Association of America, which resulted in poor box office performance. Parker and Stone attempted to negotiate with the organization on what to delete from the final print, but the MPAA would not give specific notes. They reasoned that the organization cared less because it was an independent distributor which would bring it significantly less money.

Brian Graden (then at Fox) asked the duo to produce a video Christmas card that he could send to friends. The Spirit of Christmas (1995, referred to as Jesus vs. Santa), is a variation on the theme of their earlier short. Graden sent copies to Hollywood executives; meanwhile, someone digitized it and put it on the internet, where it became one of the first viral videos. George Clooney is said to have made 300 copies for friends. Parker and Stone began talks of developing the short into a television series. Comedy Central's Doug Herzog said of the short "It literally was the funniest thing I'd ever seen. We said, 'Develop a show.'"

=== South Park ===
==== Premiere and initial success (1997–1998) ====
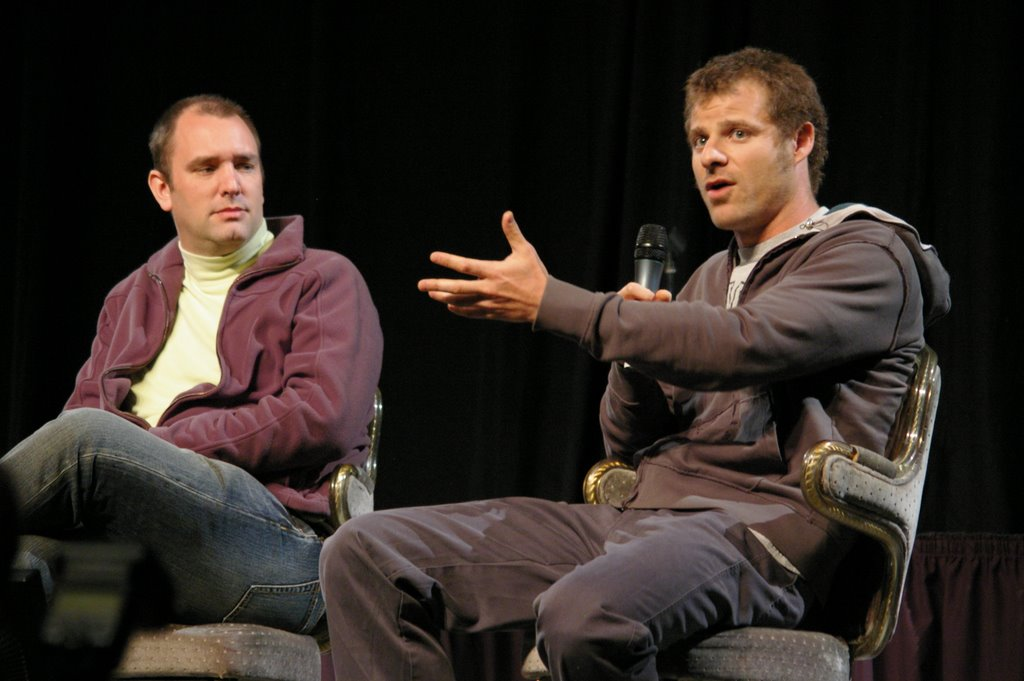
Trey Parker (left) and Matt Stone (right) do most of the writing, directing and voice acting on South Park.

The pilot episode of South Park was made on a budget of $300,000, and took between three and three and a half months to complete, and animation took place in a small room at Celluloid Studios in Denver during the summer of 1996. Like Parker and Stone's Christmas shorts, the original pilot was animated entirely with cutout animation. The idea for the town of South Park came from the Colorado basin where a lot of folklore and news reports originated about "cattle mutilations and UFO and bigfoot sightings". The setting provided a home for the show's surreal, subversive humor. Starring are four foul-mothed friends, Stan Marsh, Kyle Broflovski, Eric Cartman and Kenny McCormick.

South Park premiered in August 1997 and immediately became one of the most popular shows on cable television, averaging consistently between 3.5 and 5.5 million viewers. The show transformed the then-fledgling Comedy Central into "a cable industry power almost overnight". At the time, the cable network had a low distribution of just 21 million subscribers. Comedy Central marketed the show aggressively before its launch, billing it as "why they created the V-chip." The resulting buzz led to the network earning an estimated $30 million in T-shirts sales alone before the first episode was even aired. Due to the success of the series' first six episodes, Comedy Central requested an additional seven; the series completed its first season in February 1998. An affiliate of the MTV Network until then, Comedy Central decided, in part due to the success of South Park, to have its own independent sales department. By the end of 1998, Comedy Central had sold more than $150 million worth of merchandise for the show, including T-shirts and dolls. Over the next few years, Comedy Central's viewership spiked largely due to South Park, adding 3 million new subscribers in the first half of 1998 alone and allowed the network to sign international deals with networks in several countries. Their philosophy of taking every deal (which had surfaced as a result of their lack of trust in the early success of South Park) led to their appearances in films, albums and outside script deals. Among these was BASEketball (1998), a comedy which was a critical and commercial flop.

Stone was a fan of Primus and asked them to do the South Park theme song. Comedy Central released spinoff albums, including Chef Aid: The South Park Album and Mr. Hankey's Christmas Classics, in the late 1990s. The song "Chocolate Salty Balls" (sung by Isaac Hayes's Chef) was released as a single in the UK in 1998 and became a number one hit. He directed many of the show's musical guests, like Hayes and Radiohead.

==== Bigger, Longer, and Uncut and continued success (1999–present) ====
Parker and Stone signed a deal with Comedy Central in April 1998 that contracted the duo to producing South Park episodes until 1999, gave them a slice of the lucrative spinoff merchandising the show generated within its first year, as well as an unspecified seven-figure cash bonus to bring the show to theaters. During the time, the team was also busy writing the second and third seasons of the series, the former of which Parker and Stone later described as "disastrous". As such, figuring the phenomenon would be over soon, they decided to write a personal, fully committed musical, South Park: Bigger, Longer & Uncut. The duo fought with the MPAA to keep the film R-rated; for months the ratings board insisted on the more prohibitive NC-17. The film was only certified an R rating two weeks prior to its release, following contentious conversations between Parker/Stone, Rudin and Paramount Pictures. The film opened in cinemas in June 1999, receiving critical acclaim and grossing $83 million at the box office. "Blame Canada", cowritten by Parker and Marc Shaiman, was nominated for an Academy Award for Best Original Song. The duo attended the ceremony in drag and on LSD.

A lot of the stuff, the subject matter we've tackled, the way we found ourselves there, is simply by trying to do something that no one else has touched. And so it's like, "There's a reason why people haven't touched that." And we're like, "Oh yeah, 'cause we want to do jokes other people haven't done."

— Stone on his subversive humor

Starting in the fifth season (specifically "Scott Tenorman Must Die"), Cartman has gone from spoiled brat to scheming sociopath. Also in that season, the sweet Leopold "Butters" Stotch became a de facto fifth main character. Parker and Stone continue to write, direct, and voice most characters on South Park. Over time, the show has adopted a unique production process, in which an entire episode is written, animated and broadcast in one week. Parker and Stone state that subjecting themselves to a one-week deadline creates more spontaneity amongst themselves in the creative process, which they feel results in a funnier show. Although initial reviews for the show were negative in reference to its crass humor, the series has received numerous accolades, including five Primetime Emmy Awards, a Peabody Award and numerous inclusions in various publications' lists of greatest television shows.. In 2012, South Park cut back from producing 14 episodes per year (seven in the spring and seven in the fall) to a single run of 10 episodes in the fall, to allow the duo to explore other projects the rest of the year.

Parker and Stone had little to do with the early video games based on the series, but took full creative control of South Park: The Stick of Truth, a 2014 game based on the series that received positive reviews and for which they won the 2014 Writing in a Comedy award and Stone (as Various) was nominated for Performance in a Comedy, Supporting by National Academy of Video Game Trade Reviewers (NAVGTR). Broadcast syndication rights to South Park were sold in 2003, and all episodes are available for free full-length on-demand legal streaming on the official South Park Studios website. In 2007, the duo, with the help of their lawyer Kevin Morris cut a 50–50 joint venture with Comedy Central on all revenue not related to television; this includes digital rights to South Park, as well as movies, soundtracks, T-shirts and other merchandise, in a deal worth $75 million. The show's unique production was chronicled in Arthur Bradford's 6 Days to Air.

=== Television and film projects ===
==== That's My Bush! (2000–2001) ====
In 2000, Parker and Stone began plotting a sitcom centered on the winner of the 2000 presidential election. The duo were "95 percent sure" that Democratic candidate Al Gore would win, and tentatively titled the show Everybody Loves Al (after Everybody Loves Raymond).The main goal was to parody sitcom tropes, such as a lovable main character, the sassy maid and the wacky neighbor, in the context of the White House household. Parker said the producers did not want to make fun of politics, but instead lampoon sitcoms. They threw a party the night of the election with the writers, with intentions to begin writing the following Monday and shooting the show in January 2001 with the inauguration. With the confusion of whom the President would be, the show's production was pushed back. The show was filmed at Sony Pictures Studios, and was the first time Parker and Stone shot a show on a production lot. Timothy Bottoms starred as a fictionalized George W. Bush.

Although That's My Bush!, which ran between April–May 2001, received a fair amount of publicity and critical notice, according to Stone and Parker the cost per episode was too high at "about $1 million an episode". Comedy Central officially cancelled the series in August 2001 as a cost-cutting move; Stone was quoted as saying "A super-expensive show on a small cable network ... the economics of it were just not going to work." Comedy Central continued the show in reruns, considering it a creative and critical success. Caryn James wrote "That's My Bush! is a satire of hero worship itself; it is the anti-West Wing."

==== Team America (2002–2004) ====
In 2002, the duo began work on Team America: World Police, a satire of big-budget action films and the war on terror. It was inspired by Gerry Anderson's Thunderbirds: "We thought it would be cool if someone used the Thunderbirds kind of look but made the film fast-moving and funny. Then we realised that the only people stupid enough to do that would be us." Team America was produced using a crew of about 200 people, including three dozen highly skilled marionette operators. The puppets were designed by The Chiodo Brothers. The execution of some very simple acts by the marionettes proved to be very difficult, with a simple shot such as a character drinking taking a half-day to complete. Stone called it "the worst time of my life - I never want to see a puppet again." The film was barely completed in time for its October release date, but reviews were positive and it made a modest sum at the box office. The duo battled with the MPAA over a love scene; finally, it was rated R for "graphic, crude, sexual humor; violent images and strong language–all involving puppets."

=== Broadway and movie studio ===
==== The Book of Mormon (2011–present) ====
Parker and Stone went to see the puppet musical Avenue Q on Broadway, and found they were thanked in the Playbill. Robert Lopez, the show's writer-composer, spotted them in the audience and struck up a conversation. He expressed interest in a musical on Mormonism, a subject which had long fascinated the duo. The musical, then The Book of Mormon: The Musical of the Church of Jesus Christ of Latter-day Saints, was worked on over a period of eight years; working around their South Park schedule, they flew between New York City and Los Angeles often, first writing songs for the musical in 2006. Developmental workshops began in 2008, and the crew embarked on the first of a half-dozen workshops that would take place during the next four years. Originally, Scott Rudin planned to open The Book of Mormon Off-Broadway at the New York Theatre Workshop in summer 2010, but opted to premiere it on Broadway, "[s]ince the guys [Parker and Stone] work best when the stakes are highest."

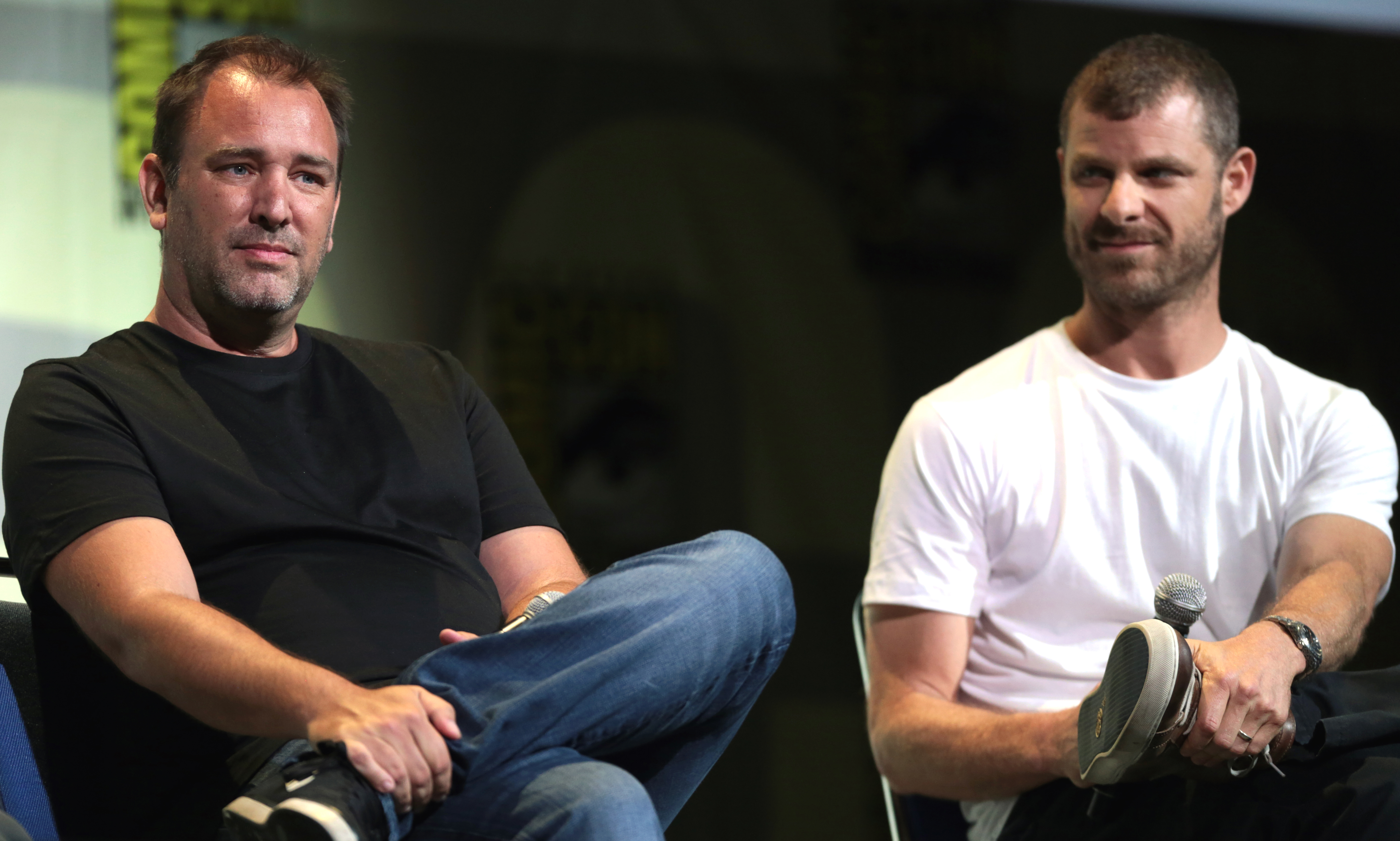
Parker (left) and Stone at San Diego Comic-Con in July 2016

After a frantic series of rewrites, rehearsals and previews, The Book of Mormon premiered at the Eugene O'Neill Theatre on March 24, 2011. The Book of Mormon follows a pair of mismatched Mormon missionaries (Josh Gad and Andrew Rannells) who are dispatched to a war-torn, AIDS-plagued village in Uganda. It received broad critical praise for the plot, score, performances, direction and choreography. The cast album became the highest-charting Broadway cast album in over four decades. The musical received nine Tony Awards, including Best Musical and a Grammy Award for Best Musical Theater Album. The national tour kicked off at the Denver Center for the Performing Arts. It has expanded to include productions in Chicago and London. Parker and Stone have confirmed a film adaption is in pre-production. The Mormon Church offered a measured response. Stone says "The official church response was something along the lines of The Book of Mormon the musical might entertain you for a night, but the Book of Mormon,' — the book as scripture — 'will change your life through Jesus'. Which we actually completely agree with. The Mormon church's response to this musical is almost like our Q.E.D. at the end of it. That's a cool, American response to a ribbing — a big musical that's done in their name. ... We weren't that surprised by the church's response. We had faith in them."

==== Future projects (2013–present) ====
With sufficient funds from their work on South Park and The Book of Mormon, the duo announced plans to create their own production studio, Important Studios, in January 2013. The studio will approve projects ranging from films to television to theatre.

In the midst of the COVID-19 pandemic, Parker, Stone, and Peter Serafinowicz created a web series, Sassy Justice. The series uses deepfake technology to insert unrelated celebrities and politicians into the fictional world of a television reporter. The first episode was posted to YouTube on October 26, 2020. The team was originally assembled for a film project that was interrupted due to the pandemic, who made the video based on a series of impressions that Serafinowicz developed of a "sassy" Donald Trump. The creators have a handful of shorter videos alongside a 15-minute first episode that may be turned into an ongoing series, film, or other type of project.

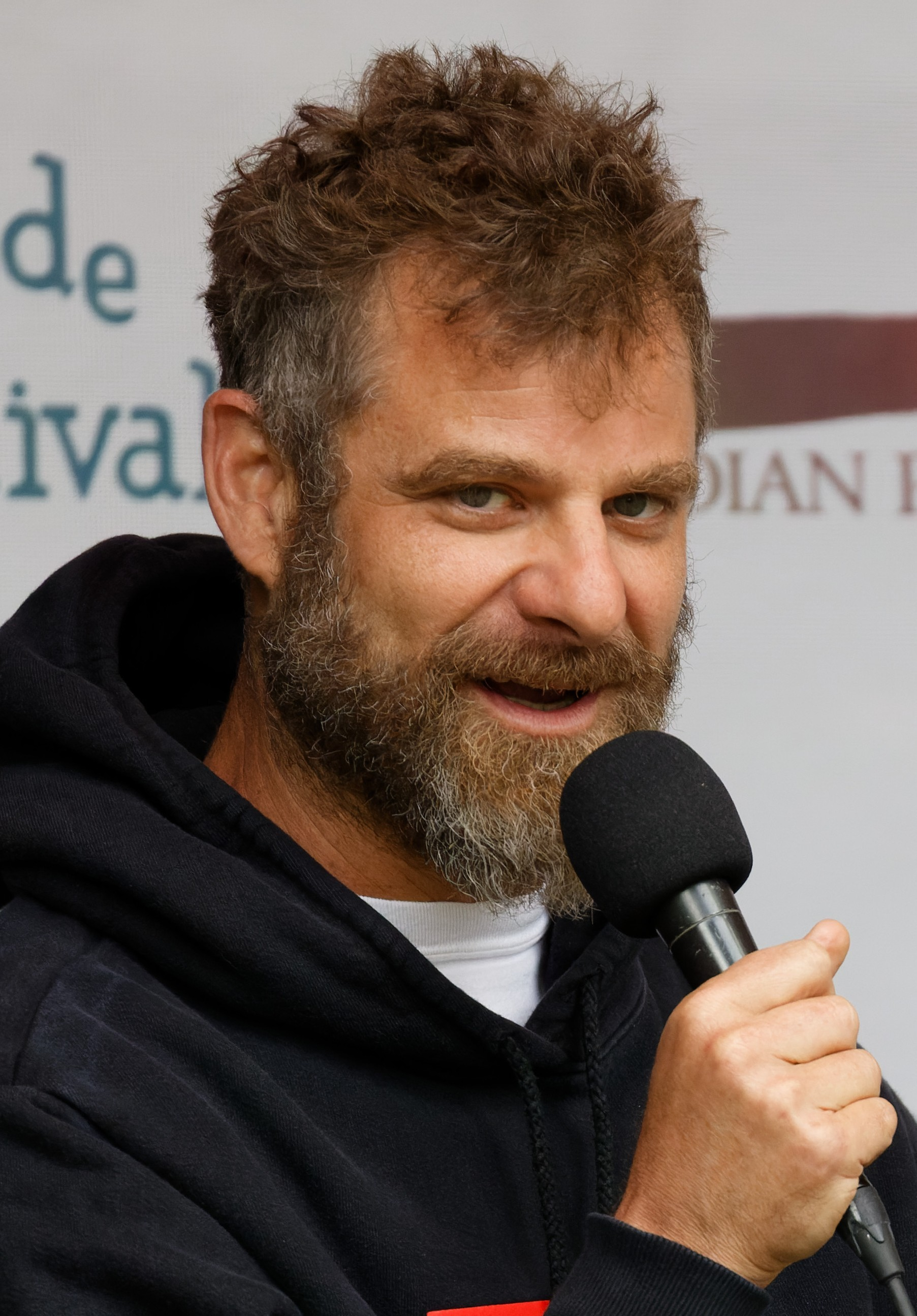
Stone at the 2024 Telluride Film Festival

In August 2021, Stone and Parker signed a $900 million deal with Paramount Global to make six additional seasons of South Park and 14 movies in the South Park universe for streaming. After the HBO Max streaming rights expired in late June 2025, on July 21, 2025, Stone and Parker announced a five-year agreement with Paramount+ to stream the series exclusively and to have 10 episodes produced per year. After signing the deal with Paramount, Stone and Parker became billionaires.

In conversation with Colorado governor Jared Polis, Parker and Stone announced that they had bought Casa Bonita. The Mexican "eatertainment" restaurant was a childhood favorite of Parker and Stone, and featured in a South Park episode. Their objection was later withdrawn, and the sale was completed by November 19. They spent $40 million renovating the restaurant and hired Chef Dana Rodriguez to update the menu. The restaurant had a soft opening on May 26, 2023. In early June, Casa Bonita began taking reservations although a formal opening date had not been set. Stone and Parker amended the employee compensation system at Casa Bonita, removing the need for wait staff to earn tips, instead paying every employee $30 per hour, much higher than the Colorado minimum wage, $13.65. The duo's endeavors were chronicled in Arthur Bradford's iCasa Bonita Mi Amor!.

In January 2022, it was announced Stone will produce an untitled film with Parker through their now-renamed production company Park County and Kendrick Lamar and Dave Free's multi-disciplinary media company PGLang. The film will mark the first theatrical collaboration, and second overall, between Parker, Stone, Lamar, and Free. Parker and Stone developed the deepfakes used in the music video for Lamar's promotional single "The Heart Part 5" (2022) through their artificial intelligence startup studio Deep Voodoo. In March 2023, it was reported that Parker will direct the film. It will be distributed by Paramount Pictures. The live-action comedy film, written by Vernon Chatman, addresses racial issues. Production began in the fall of 2024.

==== Casa Bonita controversy ====
On October 30, 2025, 57 performers at Stone and Parker's Casa Bonita went on strike for at least three days after alleging that Parker and Stone paid them unfair wages and subjected them to a less safe working environment. Actors' Equity Association president Brooke Shields criticized Stone and Parker as well, with Casa Bonita lead negotiator Andrea Hoeschen also stating that their Casa Bonita management only offered "an additional 11 cents over their last unfair wage offer, and very little for future layoff protections." It would also be revealed that the restaurant's labor union Casa Bonita United filed a National Labor Relations Board unfair labor practices charge against the restaurant in September 2025.

== Personal life ==
Stone met Comedy Central executive Angela Howard in 2001, and they began a relationship shortly after. They got married in 2008, in a ceremony officiated by Andrew Sullivan, and have two children together.

Stone has described himself as ethnically Jewish due to his mother being Jewish. He is an atheist. He dislikes New Atheism, arguing that its adherents "have set atheism back a few decades. And I'm a self-described atheist." Stone says he and Parker are "atheists who don't hate religion, who are fascinated by it and kind of admire it." He describes The Book of Mormon as "an atheist's love letter to religion". He explains "There's a catharsis in being able to really laugh at some of the goofier ideas of religion without necessarily laughing at the people practicing them. We never like to make a 'point,' per se. We want to give you room to feel what the show is saying to you. We don't want to tell anybody what the point is, or what the politics are. It's up to you to figure out what it meant." He calls the Mormon Church's response to the musical "a big-hearted, American, First Amendment-loving reaction."

A. J. Jacobs writes that "On South Park, they've mocked Big Government (smoking bans, the drug war) and remain free-speech diehards." Stone said in 2001, regarding his political views, "I hate conservatives, but I really fucking hate liberals." When asked about that quote during a 2010 interview, Stone stated: "We don't want you to come to it thinking, 'These guys are going to bash liberals,' … It's so much more fun for us to rip on liberals only because nobody else does it, and not because we think liberals are worse." In 2006, Stone described himself as libertarian. Parker and Stone have consistently defended free speech. "Cartoon Wars Part I" and "Cartoon Wars Part II" address the Jyllands-Posten Muhammad cartoons controversy, with Kyle arguing that the First Amendment right of freedom of speech protects the right to offend: "Either it's all okay, or none of it is."

He was interviewed in Michael Moore's Bowling For Columbine. Moore cuts from the interview to a South Park-style short, which Parker and Stone were not involved with. They were not amused, as evidenced by their depiction of Moore in Team America. Stone explained: "he didn't misrepresent me in the film at all. But what he did that really pissed Trey off, and kind of pissed me off too, was put a little animation right after our interview. Tons of people have come up to us and said: 'Oh I love that animation you guys did in Bowling For Columbine'. It's very South Park-esque but we didn't do it. ... It was a good lesson in what Michael Moore does in films. He doesn't necessarily say explicitly this is what it is, but he creates meaning where there is none by cutting things together. But I don't really hate the guy." He appears in Kirby Dick's This Film is Not Yet Rated, a critique of the MPAA, arguing that the board is harder on independent films than studio productions, and more lenient on violence than sex.

He speaks of how Colorado shaped his politics: "look at the way Colorado's gone politically in the last few elections, it's now gay-friendly, weed-friendly, gun-friendly. There's an element of Colorado that I think is in us." In the South Park episode "ManBearPig", Al Gore is obsessed with the eponymous entity (a stand-in for climate change), which is implied to be imaginary. In the episodes "Time to Get Cereal" and "Nobody Got Cereal?", ManBearPig is revealed to be real in the South Park universe, and the boys admit Gore was right. In conversation with Colorado governor Jared Polis, Parker and Stone are asked about how to combat ManBearPig. "He hates carbon taxes" Stone said.

In 2026, Bill Hader inducted Parker and Stone into the Television Hall of Fame. He is a fan of the band Rush, and appears in Rush: Beyond the Lighted Stage. He played drums with Geddy Lee and Alex Lifeson at the South Park Anniversary Concert at Red Rocks Amphitheatre.

== Discography ==
=== Albums ===
==== Soundtrack albums ====
List of soundtrack albums, with selected chart positions
Title	Details	Peak chart positions	
Title	Details	US	Can
Chef Aid: The South Park Album	Release date: November 24, 1998; Label: Columbia Records; Formats: CD, vinyl, digital download	16	14
South Park: Bigger, Longer & Uncut	Release date: June 15, 1999; Label: Atlantic Records; Formats: CD, vinyl, digital download	28	20
Mr. Hankey's Christmas Classics	Release date: November 23, 1999; Label: Sony Music Entertainment; Formats: CD, vinyl, digital download	—	—
Team America: World Police	Release date: October 19, 2004; Label: Atlantic Records; Formats: CD, vinyl, digital download	—	—
"—" denotes releases that did not chart

==== Cast recording ====
List of cast recording albums, with selected chart positions
Title	Details	Peak chart positions
Title	Details	US
The Book of Mormon: Original Broadway Cast Recording	Release date: May 17, 2011; Label: Ghostlight Records; Formats: CD, vinyl, digital download	3
"—" denotes releases that did not chart

== Filmography and accolades ==
- Cannibal! The Musical (1993)
- Orgazmo (1997)
- BASEketball (1998)
- South Park: Bigger, Longer & Uncut (1999)
- Terror Firmer (1999)
- Bowling for Columbine (2002)
- Run Ronnie Run (2002)
- Team America: World Police (2004)
- The Aristocrats (2005)
- This Film Is Not Yet Rated (2006)
- Electric Apricot: Quest for Festeroo (2007)
- Rush: Beyond the Lighted Stage (2010)
