= Whitney Springs =

Upcoming film by Trey Parker

- Directed by: Trey Parker
- Written by: Vernon Chatman
- Produced by: Trey Parker; Matt Stone; Kendrick Lamar; Dave Free
- Production companies: PGLang; Park County
- Distributed by: Paramount Pictures
- Country: United States
- Language: English

Whitney Springs is an upcoming American musical comedy film directed by Trey Parker and written by Vernon Chatman. The film is co-produced by Parker and longtime creative collaborator Matt Stone through Park County, along with Kendrick Lamar and Dave Free through PGLang.

Principal photography began in October 2024. The film is set to be released by Paramount Pictures in the United States.

== Premise ==
The film will depict the past and present coming to a head, when a young black man who is interning as a slave reenactor at a living history museum discovers that his white girlfriend's ancestors once owned his.

== Production ==
=== Development ===
Trey Parker and Matt Stone have worked with Vernon Chatman on their animated sitcom South Park since 2001. In addition to serving as a producer and writing consultant for the series, Chatman has voiced the anthropomorphic recurring character Towelie since the character's titular episodic debut.

The film will mark the first theatrical collaboration, and second overall, between Parker, Stone, Kendrick Lamar, and Dave Free. Parker and Stone developed the deepfakes used in the music video for Lamar's promotional single "The Heart Part 5" (2022) through their artificial intelligence startup studio Deep Voodoo. The film will also mark the first feature film to be produced through PGLang, Lamar and Free's creative company, and Park County, Parker and Stone's renamed production company.

=== Pre-production ===
The film was announced by Deadline Hollywood in January 2022. Chatman penned the screenplay, which Brian Robbins, president and chief executive officer of Paramount Pictures, called "one of the funniest and most original scripts" he has ever read. When news broke of the film's development, a director was not yet attached. By March 2023, Parker had reportedly signed on to direct the film.

=== Filming ===
Principal photography was initially scheduled to commence in the spring of 2022, but was pushed back due to Parker and Stone's prior commitments to South Park. During Paramount's CinemaCon presentation on April 11, 2024, the company confirmed that production was set to begin during the summer. Filming ultimately began in October 2024 in Pomona, California.

== Release ==
In January 2022, Paramount Pictures acquired the film's theatrical distribution, home entertainment, and television licensing rights, with Paramount+ acquiring streaming rights. In an accompanying statement (predating a rebranding of ViacomCBS as Paramount Global), Brian Robbins wrote that the film studio and the wider ViacomCBS family were "look[ing] forward to ushering in the first theatrical collaboration from these creative visionaries, and galvanizing audiences worldwide around a powerful storytelling experience."

In April 2024, Paramount scheduled the film to be released on July 4, 2025, in a nod to Independence Day. In March 2025, the film was delayed to March 20, 2026. Later that month, reports circulated that the film was titled Whitney Springs, and would be released exclusively on Paramount+ instead of in theaters. It was later debunked, but a feature film marketing opportunity webpage officially affiliated with Paramount Pictures confirmed the title and listed "musical" as one of the genres. In November 2025, Park County and PGLang announced that the film had been delayed indefinitely as post-production was not finished in time for the March 2026 release date. In September 2026, Parker and Stone publicly apologized and claimed responsibility for delays to the film, stating that they still believed in the project, though no new release date was given.
