= Sassy Justice =

TV comedy series

Sassy Justice is a web series created by Trey Parker, Matt Stone and Peter Serafinowicz that uses deepfake technology to insert unrelated celebrities and politicians into the fictional world of a television reporter. The first episode was posted to YouTube on October 26, 2020.

== Production and development ==
The series was created by the newly-formed Deep Voodoo studio, made up of over twenty computer graphics artists. The team was originally assembled for a film project that was interrupted due to the COVID-19 pandemic, who made the video based on a series of impressions that Serafinowicz developed of a "sassy" Donald Trump. The first video, which featured deepfakes of Donald Trump and Mark Zuckerberg, went viral after airing on television and YouTube in 2020. The creators have a handful of shorter videos alongside a 15-minute first episode that may be turned into an ongoing series, film, or other type of project.

Sassy Justice started filming for a second show in Cheyenne, Wyoming between August 23 and August 27, 2021. Multiple filming locations were observed including locations in downtown, midtown, and north Cheyenne. A holiday special was released in December 2020.

== Premise ==
The series follows reporter Fred Sassy of Cheyenne, Wyoming (played by Peter Serafinowicz, whose face is superimposed with a deepfake of Donald Trump) who investigates the news itself, including the dangers posed by media manipulation and fake news. Serafinowicz had previously overdubbed Trump's voice in internet videos titled "Sassy Trump".

== Reception and impact ==
Mark Frauenfelder of BoingBoing considers the first episode "terrific deepfake satire".

In 2022, Parker and Stone received $20 million in funding for their deepfake studio Deep Voodoo based on this short.

== Celebrities deepfaked ==
- Julie Andrews as Louise "Lou" Xiang, a computer technician; she is actually played by Sarah Alexander
- Michael Caine as a fictionalized version of himself (episode 1, actually Serafinowicz)
- Al Gore as a fictionalized version of himself (episode 1, actually Parker)
- Jared Kushner as a fictionalized version of himself (episode 1, actually Betty Boogie Parker)
- Donald Trump as a fictionalized version of himself (episode 1) and Fred Sassy, local investigative reporter; both are in reality Serafinowicz
- Ivanka Trump as a fictionalized version of herself (episode 1, actually Parker)
- Chris Wallace as a fictionalized version of himself (episode 1)
- Mark Zuckerberg as the Dialysis King of Cheyenne (actually Stone)
- Tom Cruise as a fictionalized version of himself (episode 1, actually Parker)

== See also ==
- Borat Subsequent Moviefilm
- Spitting Image
