= Trey Parker =

American animator, filmmaker, songwriter and actor (born 1969)

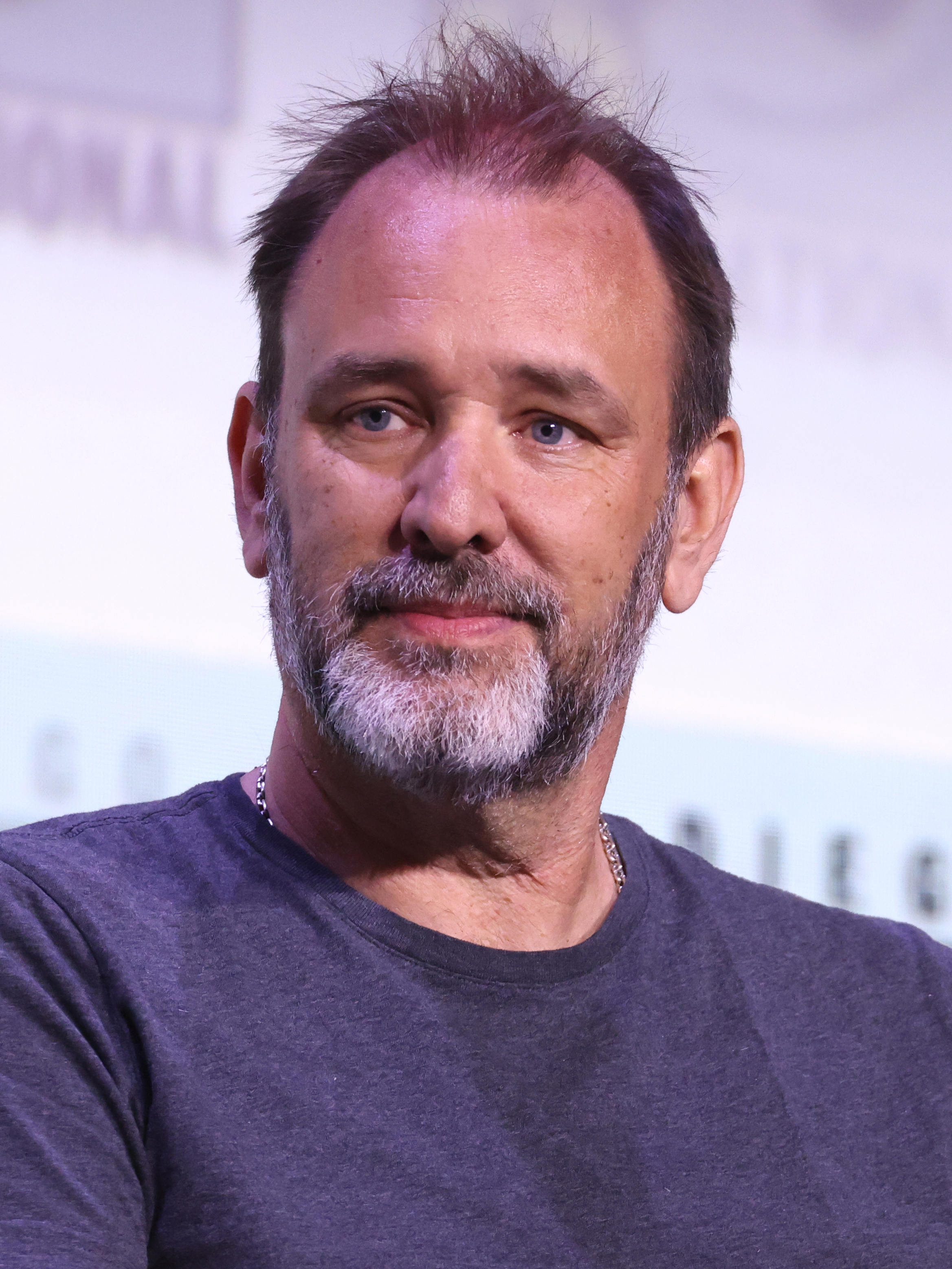
- Parker in 2025
- Born: Randolph Severn Parker III; October 19, 1969 (age 57); Conifer, Colorado, U.S.
- Education: University of Colorado Boulder
- Occupations: Actor; animator; writer; producer; director; songwriter
- Years active: 1992–present
- Works: Filmography and awards
- Spouses: Emma Sugiyama (m. 2006; div. 2008) Boogie Tillmon (m. 2014; div. 2019)
- Children: 1

Randolph Severn "Trey" Parker III (born October 19, 1969) is an American animator, filmmaker, songwriter and actor.

Born in Conifer, Colorado, Parker studied film and Japanese at the University of Colorado Boulder, where he met his creative partner Matt Stone. As students, they made the independent film Cannibal! The Musical (1993). They found fame with the animated satire South Park (since 1997) and the feature South Park: Bigger, Longer & Uncut (1999). Their satirical action film Team America: World Police (2004) stars a cast of marionettes. With Robert Lopez, they cowrote the musical The Book of Mormon, which premiered on Broadway to positive reviews.

Parker has received five Primetime Emmy Awards and a Peabody for South Park, four Tony Awards and a Grammy Award for The Book of Mormon and an Academy Award nomination for the song "Blame Canada" from South Park: Bigger, Longer & Uncut, co-written with Marc Shaiman. In 2026, he was inducted into the Television Hall of Fame. The Colorado History Museum exhibited South Park: Handmade in Colorado from December 6, 2026, through October 3, 2027, that "traces the origins of the show and its creators, Colorado natives Matt Stone and Trey Parker."

== Early life ==
Randolph Severn Parker III was born in Conifer, Colorado, the son of insurance saleswoman Sharon and geologist Randolph "Randy" Parker II. His nickname "Trey" refers to him being the third generation of his family to be named Randolph Parker. He was a shy child who took honors classes. He idolized Monty Python, and his later ventures into animation were influenced by Terry Gilliam. He was inspired to write funny songs after seeing This Is Spinal Tap (1984). He played piano, and early influences included country music and Elton John.

Parker has described himself as "the typical big-dream kid." He made short films with a group which included his future collaborator Eric Stough. He developed a love for musical theatre and joined the Evergreen Players, a community theater company. He sang in The Best Little Whorehouse in Texas and Flower Drum Song and designed sets for Little Shop of Horrors. At 17, he wrote and recorded a comedy album, Immature: A Collection of Love Ballads For The '80's Man, with friend David Goodman. He was president of the Evergreen High School choir counsel and played Danny Zuko in the Evergreen production of Grease.

After graduating high school in 1988, Parker spent a semester at Berklee College of Music before transferring to the University of Colorado Boulder, where he majored in film and Japanese. He took a film class where he met Matt Stone—a math major from the nearby town of Littleton—and the two immediately bonded over anti-authoritarian ethos and Monty Python. Parker made Giant Beavers of Southern Sri Lanka (1989), a Godzilla parody with beavers; fellow student Jason McHugh recalled that the idea nearly got him laughed out of class.

Parker and Stone wrote and acted in many short films together, among them First Date, Man on Mars and Job Application. Parker recalled that he and Stone shot a film nearly every week, but he has lost most of them. Parker used cutout animation on American History (1992), a short made for his animation class. It caused an unexpected sensation, earning Parker a Student Academy Award. At CU, the duo studied with experimental filmmaker Stan Brakhage, whom they cast in their first feature film.

== Career ==
=== Beginnings ===
==== The Spirit of Christmas and Cannibal! The Musical (1992–1994) ====
In 1992, Parker, Stone, McHugh and Ian Hardin founded a production company, Avenging Conscience, named after a film which all four hated. Parker employed cutout animation on Avenging Conscience's first film, The Spirit of Christmas (1992, referred to as Jesus vs. Frosty), a short pitting the religious figure against Frosty the Snowman. Observing the showdown are four foulmouthed friends who would feature in his later work.

The quartet created a three-minute trailer for the fictional film Alferd Packer: The Musical. Parker had long been fascinated by Alferd Packer, a nineteenth-century Colorado prospector accused of cannibalism. Parker's relationship with his fiancée fell apart and, "horribly depressed", he funneled his frustrations into the project, naming Packer's "beloved but disloyal" horse after her. The trailer became a sensation among students, leading Virgil Grillo, the chairman and founder of the university's film department, to convince the quartet to expand it to a feature film. The group raised $125,000 from family and friends. Parker, under the alias Juan Schwartz, co-produced, directed and starred, creating an Oklahoma!-style musical with ten original show tunes. Parker needed a three-syllable word and coined shpadoinkle as a placeholder. It became is a running gag in the film. It was shot in Loveland Pass as winter was ending, and the crew endured freezing weather. Filming locations included the Lake City, Colorado courthouse where Packer was tried.

Alferd Packer: The Musical premiered in Boulder, Colorado on October 31, 1993. The group submitted it to the Sundance Film Festival, which did not respond. Parker told McHugh he had a "vision" they needed to be at the festival, so they rented a conference room in a nearby hotel and put on their own screenings. MTV did a short segment on The Big Picture regarding the film, and they made industry connections through the festival.The film was sold to Troma Entertainment in 1996, and was retitled Cannibal! The Musical. Upon the duo's later success, it became their biggest-selling title. It has become a cult classic and adapted as a stage play by community theater groups and even high schools nationwide. Lloyd Kaufman submitted the film to Comedy Central, which replied: "Thank you for submitting and resubmitting Cannibal! The Musical, but it is simply not up to our standards for broadcasting." Today, the letter is displayed in Parker's office at Comedy Central.

==== Your Studio and You and Orgazmo (1995–1997) ====
Following Cannibal!, the group, sans Hardin, moved to Los Angeles. Upon arrival, they met a lawyer for the William Morris Agency who connected them with producer Scott Rudin. As a result, they acquired a lawyer, an agent and a script deal. Despite believing themselves to be on the verge of success, the duo struggled for several years. Cannibal! got the attention of producer Pam Brady. They unsuccessfully pitched Time Warped', which would have involved fictionalized stories of historical figures, to Fox Kids. The first pilot, "Rom and Jul", involved romance between Australopithecus and Homo erectus. The trio created two separate pilots but, despite Brady's approval, the network disbanded Fox Kids.

David Zucker, a fan of Cannibal!, asked the duo for a 15-minute film for a party celebrating Seagram's acquisition of Universal Pictures. Zucker told Parker, "The script is really funny. You'll have a blast." Parker found there was no script. Zucker explained, "Oh, no. I meant the script I know you're going to write is going to be really funny." The duo improvised much of it an hour before it was shot. Your Studio and You is a spoof of 1950s educational films starring Sylvester Stallone, Demi Moore, Steven Spielberg and others. Parker recalled "You could probably make a feature film out of the experience of making that movie because it was just two dudes from college suddenly directing Steven Spielberg."

Between shooting the pilots for Time Warped, Parker penned Orgazmo, about a Mormon missionary moonlighting as a porn star. When it later entered production, half of the budget came from Kuki, a Japanese porn company which wanted to feature its performers in mainstream Western media. Independent distributor October Films purchased the rights for one million dollars after its premiere at the Toronto International Film Festival. The film received an NC-17 rating from the Motion Picture Association of America, which resulted in poor box office performance. Parker and Stone attempted to negotiate with the organization on what to delete from the final print, but the MPAA would not give specific notes. The duo later theorized that the organization cared less because it was an independent distributor which would bring it significantly less money.

Brian Graden (then at Fox) asked the duo to produce a video Christmas card that he could send to friends. The Spirit of Christmas (1995, referred to as Jesus vs. Santa), is a variation on the theme of their earlier short. Graden sent copies to Hollywood executives; meanwhile, someone digitized it and put it on the internet, where it became one of the first viral videos. George Clooney is said to have made 300 copies for friends. Parker and Stone began talks of developing the short into a television series. Comedy Central's Doug Herzog said of the short "It literally was the funniest thing I'd ever seen. We said, 'Develop a show.'"

=== South Park ===
==== Premiere and initial success (1997–1998) ====
The pilot episode of South Park was made on a budget of $300,000 and took between three and three and a half months to complete; animation took place at Celluloid Studios in Denver during the summer of 1996. Like Parker and Stone's Christmas shorts, the original pilot was animated entirely with traditional cutout animation. The town of South Park was named for the real Colorado basin, where, according to the creators, a lot of folklore and news reports originated about "UFO sightings, and cattle mutilations, and Bigfoot sightings." The setting provided a home for the show's subversive, surreal humor. Starring are four foul-mothed friends, Stan Marsh, Kyle Broflovski, Eric Cartman and Kenny McCormick.

At the time, Comedy Central had a distribution of just 21 million subscribers. The company marketed the show aggressively before its launch, billing it as "why they created the V-chip". The resulting buzz led to the network earning an estimated $30 million in T-shirts sales alone before the first episode was even aired. South Park premiered in August 1997 and immediately became one of the most popular shows on cable television, consistently averaging between 3.5 and 5.5 million viewers. The show transformed the fledgling network into "a cable industry power almost overnight". Due to the success of the first six episodes, Comedy Central requested an additional seven; South Park completed its first season in February 1998. An affiliate of the MTV Network until then, Comedy Central decided, in part due to the success of South Park, to have its own independent sales department. By the end of 1998, Comedy Central had sold more than $150 million worth of merchandise for the show, including T-shirts and dolls. Over the next few years, Comedy Central's viewership spiked, largely due to South Park, adding 3 million new subscribers in the first half of 1998 alone, and allowed the network to sign international deals with networks in several countries.

Parker and Stone's philosophy of taking every deal led to their appearances in films, albums and outside script deals. Among them was BASEketball, (1998), a critical and commercial flop, and rights to produce a prequel to Dumb and Dumber, which was never completed. Comedy Central released Chef Aid: The South Park Album and Mr. Hankey's Christmas Classics in the late 1990s. "Chocolate Salty Balls" (sung by Isaac Hayes's Chef) was a number one hit in the UK.

==== Bigger, Longer & Uncut and continued success ====
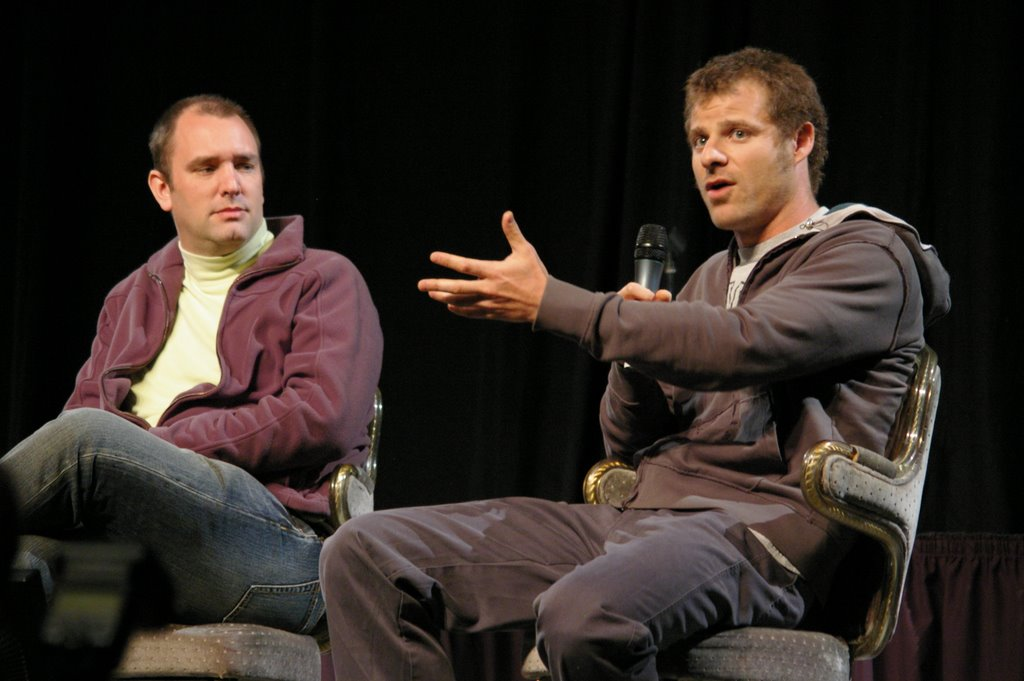
Parker (left) and Matt Stone (right) continue to do most of the writing, directing and voice acting on South Park.

Parker and Stone signed a deal with Comedy Central in April 1998 that contracted them to produce South Park episodes until 1999, gave them a slice of the spinoff merchandising and an unspecified seven-figure cash bonus to bring it to the big screen. The team was writing the second and third seasons, and described the former as "disastrous". Figuring the phenomenon would soon be over, they decided to write a personal, fully committed musical. Parker and Stone fought with the MPAA to keep the film R-rated; for months the ratings board insisted on the more prohibitive NC-17. It was only given an R rating two weeks prior to its release, following contentious conversations between Parker/Stone, Rudin and Paramount Pictures. They were overwhelmed during the production process, especially between April and the film's opening in late June. Parker admitted that press coverage proclaiming the end of South Park was near bothered him. South Park: Bigger, Longer & Uncut opened in June 1999 to critical acclaim and grossed $83 million at the box office. "Blame Canada", cowritten with Marc Shaiman, was nominated for Academy Award for Best Original Song. Of the ceremony he said, "I guess we should go, but it's sort of everything that South Park is against." The duo decided to attend in drag and on LSD. He recalls, "There's the moment where we just lost to Phil Collins, and you're sitting there coming down off the acid in a dress, surrounded by people in this theater, and you're like, 'Dude, we have to get the fuck out of here.'" Stephen Sondheim penned Parker a letter calling Bigger, Longer & Uncut the best movie musical in 15 years. Parker called the praise of an artist he revered more meaningful than an Academy Award.

Starting in the fifth season (specifically "Scott Tenorman Must Die"), Cartman went from spoiled brat to scheming sociopath. Also in that season, the sweet Leopold "Butters" Stotch became a de facto fifth main character. Parker and Stone continue to write, direct and voice most characters on South Park. The show has adopted a unique production process, in which an entire episode is written, animated and broadcast in one week. Parker and Stone state that subjecting themselves to a one-week deadline creates more spontaneity, which they feel results in a funnier show. The series has received numerous accolades, including five Primetime Emmy Awards, a Peabody Award and inclusions in various publications' lists of greatest TV shows.

In 2012, South Park cut back from producing 14 episodes per year (seven in the spring and seven in the fall) to a single run of 10 episodes in the fall, to allow the duo to explore other projects the rest of the year. It parodies pop culture, as in "The Return of the Fellowship of the Ring to the Two Towers". The Church of Scientology objected to the explication of its teachings in "Trapped in the Closet" (an illustrative segment has the subtitle "This is what Scientologists actually believe.") "Cartoon Wars Part I" and "Cartoon Wars Part II" address the Jyllands-Posten Muhammad cartoons controversy, with Kyle arguing that the First Amendment right of freedom of speech protects the right to offend: "Either it's all okay, or none of it is." Broadcast syndication rights to South Park were sold in 2003, and all episodes are available for free full-length on-demand legal streaming on the South Park Studios website. In 2007, the duo, with the help of their lawyer, Kevin Morris, cut a 50–50 joint venture with Comedy Central on all revenue not related to television; this includes digital rights to South Park, as well as films, soundtracks, T-shirts and other merchandise, in a deal worth $75 million. Parker and Stone had little to do with the development of earlyvideo games based on the series, but took full creative control of South Park: The Stick of Truth (2014), which received positive reviews. They shared (with Eric Fenstermaker) the 2014 Writing In A Comedy, and Parker won the Performance in a Comedy, Supporting award by National Academy of Video Game Trade Reviewers (NAVGTR).

In August 2021, Parker and Stone signed a $900 million deal with ViacomCBS to renew the series for six additional seasons and 14 projects on Paramount+. The show's unique production was chronicled in Arthur Bradford's 6 Days to Air.

=== Television and film projects ===
==== That's My Bush! (2000–2001) ====
In 2000, Parker and Stone began plotting a sitcom centered on the winner of the 2000 presidential election. They were "95 percent sure" that Democratic candidate Al Gore would win, and tentatively titled the show Everybody Loves Al. Parker said they did not want to parody politics; the goal was to send up sitcom tropes, such as a lovable main character, the sassy maid and the wacky neighbor. They threw a party the night of the election with the writers, with intentions to begin writing the following Monday and shooting the show in January 2001 with the inauguration. With the uncertainty about the election results, the show's production was pushed back. The show was filmed at Sony Pictures Studios, and was the first time Parker and Stone shot a show on a production lot. It starred Timothy Bottoms as a fictionalized Bush.

Although That's My Bush!, which ran between April and May 2001, received a fair amount of publicity and critical notice, per Parker and Stone, the production cost was too expensive, "about $1 million an episode." Comedy Central officially cancelled the series in August 2001 as a cost-cutting move; Stone was quoted as saying "A super-expensive show on a small cable network...the economics of it were just not going to work." Comedy Central continued the show in reruns, considering it a creative and critical success. Parker believed the show would not have survived after the September 11 attacks anyway, and Stone agreed, saying it would not "play well".

==== Team America (2002–2004) ====
In 2002, the duo began working on Team America: World Police, a satire of big-budget action films and the war on terror. It was inspired by the 1960s British marionette series, Thunderbirds.

Team America was produced using a crew of about 200 people, including three dozen highly skilled marionette operators. Execution of very simple acts by the marionettes proved very difficult, with a simple shot such as a character drinking taking a half-day to complete successfully. The film was barely completed in time for its October release date, but reviews were positive and it made a modest sum at the box office. Sondheim sent Parker a second letter, revealing that he voted for Team America for Best Picture. Sondheim signed off, "Would you ever be interested in writing a stage musical with an old traditionalist, namely me?"

=== Broadway and film studio ===
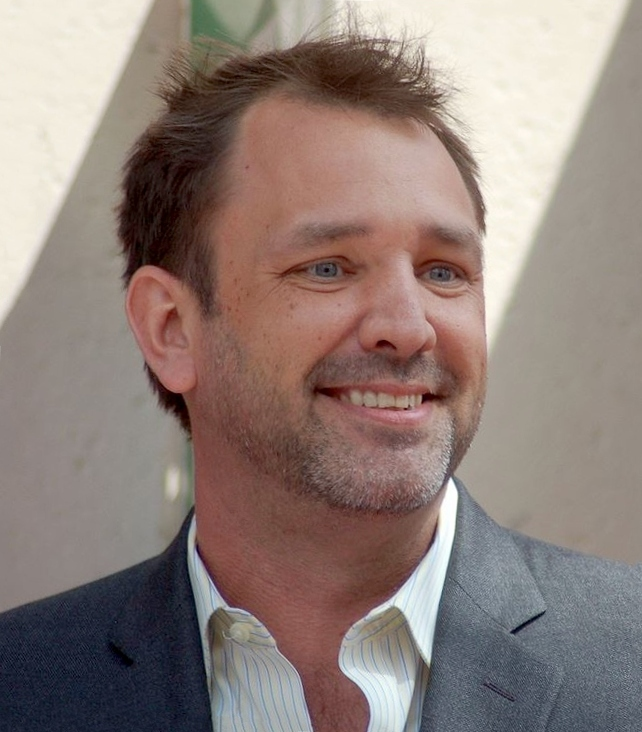
Parker at a ceremony for Penn & Teller to receive a star on the Hollywood Walk of Fame in 2013

==== The Book of Mormon ====
Parker and Stone went to see the puppet musical Avenue Q on Broadway, and found they were thanked in the Playbill. They met the show's co-composer, Robert Lopez. Lopez expressed interest in doing a musical on Mormonism, a subject which had long fascinated the duo. The musical, then The Book of Mormon: The Musical of the Church of Jesus Christ of Latter-day Saints, was worked on over a period of eight years; working around their South Park schedule, they flew between New York City and Los Angeles often, first writing songs for the musical in 2006. Developmental workshops began in 2008, and the crew embarked on the first of a half-dozen workshops that would take place during the next four years. Originally, Scott Rudin planned to open the musical Off-Broadway at the New York Theatre Workshop in summer 2010, but opted to premiere it directly on Broadway, "[s]ince the guys [Parker and Stone] work best when the stakes are highest."

After a frantic series of rewrites, rehearsals and previews, The Book of Mormon premiered at the Eugene O'Neill Theatre on March 24, 2011. It starred Josh Gad and Andrew Rannells as a pair of mismatched Mormon missionaries dispatched to war-torn Uganda. Parker codirected it with Casey Nicholaw. The Book of Mormon received broad critical praise for the plot, score, performances, direction and choreography. Ben Brantley wrote that it is "blasphemous, scurrilous and more foul-mouthed than David Mamet on a blue streak. But trust me when I tell you that its heart is as pure as that of a Rodgers and Hammerstein show. That's right, the same Rodgers and Hammerstein who wrote the beloved Sound of Music and King and I, two works specifically (and deliciously) referenced here." Frank Rich wrote "However skeptical their show may be of the Church of Latter-day Saints in particular and religion in general, its faith in the Broadway brand of tuneful, funny, well-told and uplifting musicals is orthodox and unshakeable. The Book of Mormon scrupulously follows the old testament of Broadway circa 1945-1965, A.D., even while fondly spoofing it."

The cast recording became the highest-charting Broadway cast album in over four decades. The musical received nine Tony Awards, including Best Musical and a Grammy Award for Best Musical Theater Album. The production has since expanded to two national tours, a Chicago production and a UK production. As of 2014 Parker and Stone had confirmed that a film adaption was in pre-production. The Church of Jesus Christ of Latter-day Saints offered a measured response; issuing a statement reading "The production may attempt to entertain audiences for an evening, but the Book of Mormon as a volume of scripture will change people's lives forever by bringing them closer to Christ." The church put ads in the Playbill; one featured a smiling Mormon and the text "The book is always better."

==== Future projects ====
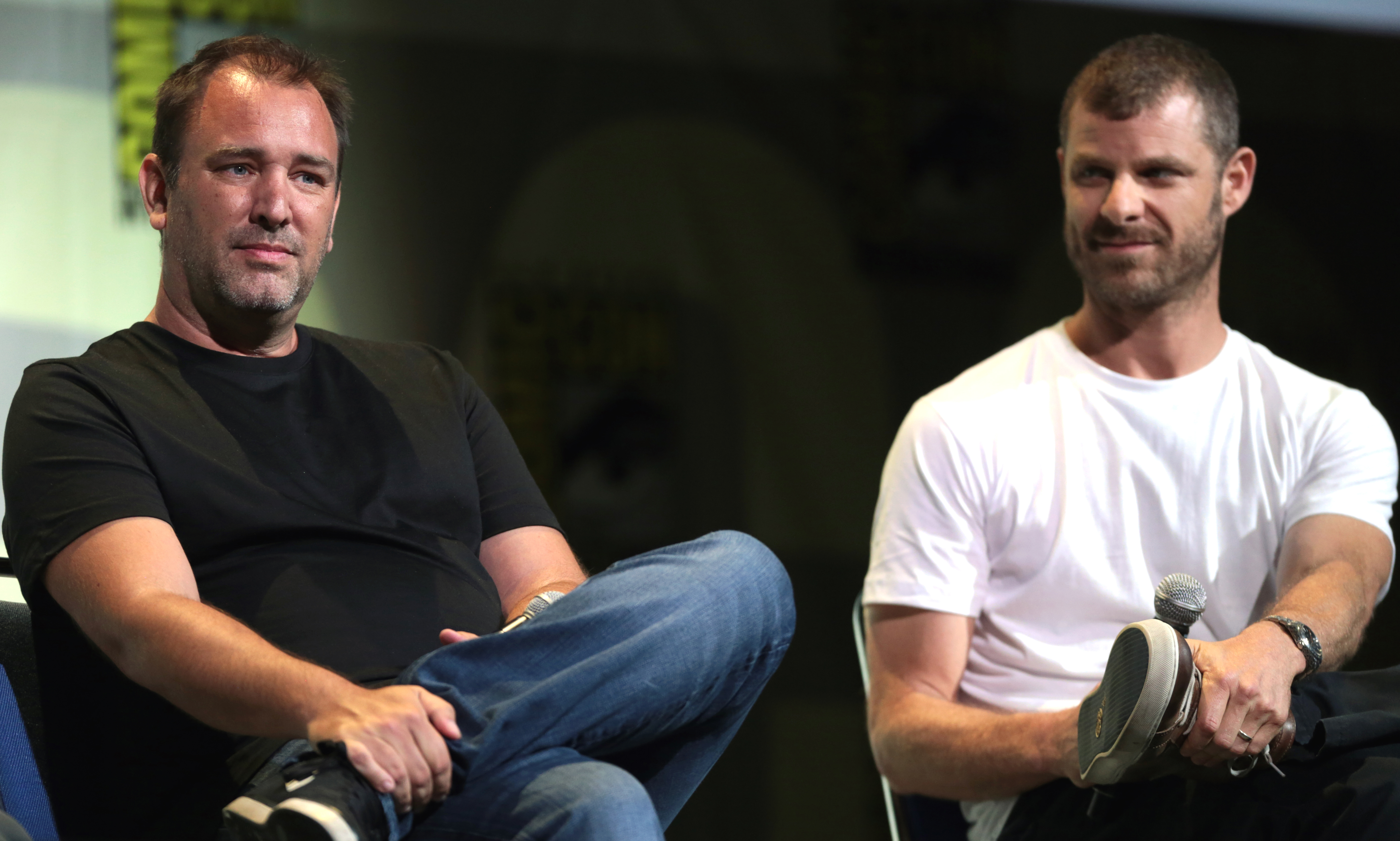
Parker (left) and Stone (right) at San Diego Comic-Con in July 2016

With funds from South Park and The Book of Mormon, the duo announced plans to create their own production company, Important Studios, in January 2013. The studio will approve projects ranging from films to television to theatre.

On April 13, 2016, Universal Pictures announced that Parker would voice the villain Balthazar Bratt in Despicable Me 3. The film, released in June 2017, was Parker's first voice role not scripted by either him or Matt Stone.

In the midst of the COVID-19 pandemic, Parker, Stone, and Peter Serafinowicz created a web series, Sassy Justice. The series uses deepfake technology to insert unrelated celebrities and politicians into the fictional world of a television reporter. The first episode was posted to YouTube on October 26, 2020. The team was originally assembled for a film project that was interrupted due to the pandemic, who made the video based on a series of impressions that Serafinowicz developed of a "sassy" Donald Trump. The creators have a handful of shorter videos alongside a 15-minute first episode that may be turned into an ongoing series, film, or other type of project.

In August 2021, Parker and Stone signed a $900 million deal with Paramount Global to make six additional seasons of South Park and 14 movies in the South Park universe for streaming. After the HBO Max streaming rights expired in late June 2025, on July 21, 2025, Parker and Stone announced a five-year agreement with Paramount+ to stream the series exclusively and to have 10 episodes produced per year. After signing the deal with Paramount, Parker and Stone became billionaires.

In conversation with Jared Polis, Parker and Stone announced an agreement to purchase Casa Bonita for $3.1 million. The Mexican "eatertainment" restaurant was a childhood favorite of Parker and Stone, and featured in a South Park episode. A group named "Save Casa Bonita" filed an objection to Parker and Stone's purchase, pointing out that they had in fact made an offer first. Their objection was later withdrawn, and the sale was completed by November 19. They spent $40 million renovating the restaurant and hired Chef Dana Rodriguez to update the menu. The restaurant had a soft opening on May 26, 2023. In early June, Casa Bonita began taking reservations although a formal opening date had not been set. Parker and Stone amended the employee compensation system at Casa Bonita, removing the need for wait staff to earn tips, instead paying every employee $30 per hour, much higher than the Colorado minimum wage, $13.65. The duo's endeavors were chronicled in Arthur Bradford's iCasa Bonita Mi Amor!.

In January 2022, it was announced Parker will produce a film entitled Whitney Springs with Stone through their now-renamed production company Park County and Kendrick Lamar and Dave Free's multi-disciplinary media company PGLang. The film will mark the first theatrical collaboration, and second overall, between Parker, Stone, Lamar, and Free. Parker and Stone developed the deepfakes used in the music video for Lamar's promotional single "The Heart Part 5" (2022) through their artificial intelligence startup studio Deep Voodoo. In March 2023, it was reported that Parker will direct the film. It will be distributed by Paramount Pictures. The live-action comedy film, written by Vernon Chatman, addresses racial issues. Production began in the fall of 2024.

==== Casa Bonita controversy ====
On October 30, 2025, 57 performers at Parker and Stone's Casa Bonita went on strike for at least three days after alleging that Parker and Stone paid them unfair wages and subjected them to a less safe working environment. Actors' Equity Association (AEA) president Brooke Shields also criticized Parker and Stone as well, with AEA lead negotiator Andrea Hoeschen also stating that their Casa Bonita management only offered "an additional 11 cents over their last unfair wage offer, and very little for future layoff protections." It would also be revealed that restaurant's labor union Casa Bonita United also filed a National Labor Relations Board unfair labor practices charge against the restaurant in September 2025.

== Personal life ==
Parker married Emma Sugiyama in 2006. Their marriage was officiated by 1970s sitcom producer Norman Lear. The marriage ended in divorce in 2008.

Parker subsequently began a relationship with Boogie Tillmon, whom he later married in 2014. Parker gained a stepson through this relationship. Their daughter was born in 2013. The couple filed for divorce in 2019, citing irreconcilable differences. While they remain divorced, they still have an amicable relationship and co-parent their child, who voices characters on South Park

Parker resides in Los Angeles, California. He owns properties in Steamboat Springs, Colorado; Kauai, Hawaii; Seattle, Washington; and Midtown Manhattan in New York City.

In a September 2006 edition of the ABC News program Nightline, Parker expressed his views on religion, stating that he believes in "a God" and that "there is knowledge that humanity does not yet possess" while cautioning that it would take a long time to explain exactly what he meant by his belief in God. Parker believes all religions are "silly". He stated: "All the religions are super funny to me... The story of Jesus makes no sense to me. God sent His only Son. Why could God only have one son and why would He have to die? It's just bad writing, really. And it's really terrible in about the second act." Parker further remarked,

Basically... out of all the ridiculous religion stories which are greatly, wonderfully ridiculous—the silliest one I've ever heard is, 'Yeah... there's this big giant universe and it's expanding, it's all gonna collapse on itself and we're all just here just 'cause... just 'cause'. That, to me, is the most ridiculous explanation ever.

Parker and Stone are free speech fundamentalists. He explained: "What we've stood behind for 10 years is: It's got to all be OK or none of it is. Because as soon as you start picking, 'Well, OK, we won't do this,' then all of a sudden the ones you did about that shouldn't be OK either." A 2001 Los Angeles Times article described Parker as "not overly political" and quoted him as saying he was "a registered Libertarian". In 2004, Parker summed up his views with the comment:

What we're sick of—and it's getting even worse—is: you either like Michael Moore or you wanna fuckin' go overseas and shoot Iraqis. There can't be a middle ground. Basically, if you think Michael Moore's full of shit, then you are a super-Christian right-wing whatever. And we're both just pretty middle-ground guys. We find just as many things to rip on on the left as we do on the right. People on the far left and the far right are the same exact person to us.

Parker says two causes he and Stone support are "gay marriage and guns. We're for both of those."

In 2026, Bill Hader inducted Parker and Stone into the Television Hall of Fame. In his speech, Parker said

It's incredible to know that there are millions of people around the globe who think a lot like we do. People who aren't on one extreme or another, people who question things, people who change their minds, people who can see how ridiculous both sides can get. People who believe, that, no matter what, we can't stop laughing, at ourselves, at each other, because when any one group takes itself too seriously, really, really bad shit happens, as we're seeing right now.

Irrationality is a theme of their work: "That's why we've been around for twenty-four years."

== Discography ==
=== Albums ===
==== Soundtrack albums ====
List of soundtrack albums, with selected chart positions
Title	Details	Peak chart positions	
Title	Details	US	Can
Chef Aid: The South Park Album	Release date: November 24, 1998; Label: Columbia Records; Formats: CD, vinyl, digital download	16	14
South Park: Bigger, Longer & Uncut	Release date: June 15, 1999; Label: Atlantic Records; Formats: CD, vinyl, digital download	28	20
Mr. Hankey's Christmas Classics	Release date: November 23, 1999; Label: Sony Music Entertainment; Formats: CD, vinyl, digital download	—	—
Team America: World Police	Release date: October 19, 2004; Label: Sony Music Entertainment; Formats: CD, vinyl, digital download	—	—
"—" denotes releases that did not chart

==== Cast recording ====
List of cast recording albums, with selected chart positions
Title	Details	Peak chart positions
Title	Details	US
The Book of Mormon: Original Broadway Cast Recording	Release date: May 17, 2011; Label: Ghostlight Records; Formats: CD, vinyl, digital download	3
"—" denotes releases that did not chart

=== Songwriting and other appearances ===
Year	Song	Artist	Album	Contribution
1998	"Chocolate Salty Balls"	Isaac Hayes	Chef Aid: The South Park Album	Writer
1999	"Blame Canada"	Mary Kay Bergman	South Park: Bigger, Longer & Uncut	Co-writer, composer
2000	"Timmy and the Lords of the Underworld"	Himself and Matt Stone	Non-album single	Co-writer, composer
2017	"Hug Me"	Pharrell Williams and himself	Despicable Me 3: Original Motion Picture Soundtrack	Co-writer, composer

== Filmography and accolades ==
- Cannibal! The Musical (1993)
- Orgazmo (1997)
- BASEketball (1998)
- South Park: Bigger, Longer & Uncut (1999)
- Terror Firmer (1999)
- Run Ronnie Run! (2002)
- Team America: World Police (2004)
- The Aristocrats (2005)
- Despicable Me 3 (2017)
- Minions & Monsters (2026)
- Whitney Springs (2026)
