= Your Studio and You =

- Directed by: Trey Parker
- Written by: Trey Parker; Matt Stone
- Starring: Sylvester Stallone; Demi Moore; Steven Spielberg; Michael J. Fox; Brian Grazer
- Narrated by: Trey Parker
- Cinematography: Kenny Gioseffi
- Distributed by: Universal Pictures
- Release date: 1995
- Running time: 14 minutes
- Country: United States
- Language: English

Your Studio and You is a 1995 American comedy short film created by Matt Stone and Trey Parker. The two made it for Universal Pictures and commissioned by comedic filmmaker David Zucker. It was to be played at a party Seagram threw for its employees acquired as a result of its Universal take-over. It parodies the style of 1950s educational films such as Duck and Cover, while poking fun at Universal and its talent. It was shot in the Universal Studios Lot, and it runs approximately 14 minutes.

Upon commissioning the duo to make this film, David Zucker failed to mention that there was no script, so everything was written by Parker and Stone less than an hour before it was shot.

The film is notable in that it was Stone and Parker's first Hollywood gig. Parker has said that "you could probably make a feature film out of the experience of making that movie because it was just two dudes from college suddenly directing Steven Spielberg." This film has still seen no public release as it was intended to be strictly an internal film (indeed, its creators were not even allowed a copy), but copies of the film have surfaced on the Internet. Ifilm.com had the video on its site for a limited time. The video was promoted on the site in ad banners. These advertisements included the date that ifilm.com would stop hosting the video.

Stone and Parker would make their first major studio-produced feature, BASEketball, for Universal with David Zucker directing (albeit one in which they merely starred). Parker would very later appear in the 2017 animated Universal/Illumination film Despicable Me 3 as the antagonist Balthazar Bratt.

== Celebrity appearances ==
The film is also notable for its use of a number of celebrity actors, musicians, writers, producers, and directors in the Universal family, including Andrew Bergman, James Cameron (shown improving the Universal Studios landscaping), Shaun Cassidy, Robin Cook, Shelley Fabares, Michael J. Fox, Brian Grazer, Heavy D, Jeffrey Katzenberg, Barry Kemp, Angela Lansbury (shown painting the Psycho House), Mike Lobell, Traci Lords, Kevin Misher, Demi Moore, Darrin Pfeiffer, John Singleton, Steven Spielberg (shown as a Universal Studios Guide), Sylvester Stallone (in his Rocky Balboa character, and subtitled for comedic effect), Marty Stuart, David Zucker, and Jerry Zucker.

Matt Stone appears with Trey Parker as two guys at a food stand during the "It's UCS for me!" segment.
