= Orgazmo =

1997 film by Trey Parker

- Theatrical release poster
- Directed by: Trey Parker
- Written by: Trey Parker
- Produced by: Matt Stone; Jason McHugh; Fran Rubel Kuzui
- Starring: Trey Parker; Matt Stone; Dian Bachar; Robyn Lynne; Michael Dean Jacobs
- Cinematography: Kenny Gioseffi
- Edited by: Michael R. Miller; Trey Parker
- Music by: Paul Robb
- Production company: Avenging Conscience
- Distributed by: October Films
- Release dates: September 6, 1997 (Toronto); October 23, 1998 (United States)
- Running time: 94 minutes
- Country: United States
- Language: English
- Budget: $1 million
- Box office: $602,302

Orgazmo is a 1997 American superhero sex comedy film written, directed and edited by Trey Parker and produced by Matt Stone, Jason McHugh, and Fran Rubel Kuzui. It stars Trey Parker, Matt Stone, Dian Bachar, Robyn Lynne, and Michael Dean Jacobs. The plot follows Joe Young (Trey Parker), a devout Mormon missionary who, to pay for his and his fiancée's dream wedding and home, acts in a pornographic film as the superhero Orgazmo with his side-kick Choda Boy (Dian Bachar).

The film was conceived by Trey Parker, with collaborators Matt Stone and Jason McHugh, as a raunchy satire reflecting their own move from Colorado to Hollywood, using the sex industry as a backdrop to heighten its absurdity. Though initially met with resistance from major studios, the film was ultimately funded partly by a Japanese porn company and secured distribution through October Films. While Orgazmo received mixed reviews, and struggled at the box office after receiving an NC-17 rating from the MPAA, it endures as a cult film among fans of Parker and Stone's South Park.

== Plot ==
Mormon missionary Joseph Young, assigned with his mission partner to Los Angeles, finds the city to be a hostile and unenthusiastic place for their work. The problems worsen when they knock on the door of sleazy porn director Maxxx Orbison and several security guards are sent to dispose of them. Joe defeats them all singlehandedly with a variety of martial arts skills. Impressed by his performance and bored by his project's lead actor, Orbison attempts to hire Joe to play the title character and lead of his pornographic superhero film, Orgazmo. Joe is conflicted because of his religious beliefs, but the $20,000 salary offered would pay for a wedding in the temple in Utah where his fiancée Lisa has expressed a strong desire to wed. After learning that a stunt cock would stand in for him during explicit close-up scenes, Joe reluctantly accepts despite being given a very clear sign from God to refuse.

Joe finds the crew of the film intimidating but befriends co-star Ben Chapleski, a technical genius and MIT alumnus who works in the pornographic industry to satiate his overactive libido. He plays Orgazmo's sidekick Choda Boy, who assists Orgazmo with specially designed sex toys, including Orgazmo's signature weapon, the Orgazmorator, a ray gun that forces orgasm upon whomever it is fired. Ben invites Joe to his home and shows Joe a real Orgazmorator he has built, and he and Joe spend an evening using it on unsuspecting citizens for amusement.

At a sushi bar owned by Ben's Japanese friend G-Fresh, the two witness a group of thugs vandalizing the bar to force out G-Fresh so their dance club next door can expand. When Ben and Joe are gone, G-Fresh is coerced to leave after the same thugs assault him. Upon finding this out, Joe and Ben don costumes and use their film props and the Orgazmorator to sneak into the club and steal back the contract G-Fresh was forced to sign. Joe is agitated after nearly being shot in the head, but Ben is excited by being a real superhero.

Orgazmo becomes an success, both financially and critically, and Orbison withholds Joe's paycheck to keep him in town long enough to announce a sequel. Tempted by a doubled salary, Joe is confronted by Lisa, who has found out what he has been doing and leaves him. Facing production difficulties and harassment from Orbison's unsympathetic nephew A-Cup, Joe tries to back out of the project, but Orbison refuses. When Joe stands up to him, Orbison has Lisa kidnapped. Ben realizes the thugs who assaulted G-Fresh work for Orbison, and he joins Joe in storming Orbison's mansion before Lisa can be forced to perform in one of Orbison's films.

Fighting through Orbison's group of henchmen, Joe and Ben meet their match in A-Cup. Joe encourages Ben to unleash his long-repressed Hamster Style discipline of martial arts, allowing Ben to beat A-Cup. After repairing his damaged Orgazmorator, Joe repeatedly shoots Orbison with it, incapacitating him and capturing all the henchmen. Ben blows up the mansion with another device, the "Cock Rocket", destroying Orbison's base of operations. Joe and Lisa reconcile, and she gives him her blessing to remain in Los Angeles and continue being a hero alongside Ben.

A doctor tells Orbison that after so many orgasms in a row, his testicles have swollen to the size of oranges, and surgical removal is the only option. An insane Orbison declares revenge on Orgazmo and becomes the personification of A-Cup's character, who is immune to the Orgazmorator: Neutered Man.

== Cast ==
- Trey Parker as Joe Young/Orgazmo
- Dian Bachar as Ben Chapleski/Choda Boy
  - Robert Lansing as Young Ben
- Robyn Lynne Raab as Lisa
- Michael Dean Jacobs as Maxxx Orbison
- Matt Stone as Dave The Lighting Guy
- Masao Maki as G-Fresh
- Toddy Walters as Georgi
- Ron Jeremy as Clark/Jizzmaster Zero
- David Dunn as A-Cup/Neutered Man
- Chasey Lain as Candi
- Juli Ashton as Saffi
- Shayla LaVeaux as Greek Porn Actress
- Jill Kelly as Nurse
- Lloyd Kaufman as Doctor
- Max Hardcore as Award Show Presenter
- Christi Lake
- Jeanna Fine
- Jacklyn Lick
- Mike Eaton as Meatfish
- Melissa Hill
- Serenity

== Production ==
The film was conceived by Trey Parker, who collaborated on its development with Jason McHugh and Matt Stone, his creative partner and future co-creator of South Park. Parker, Stone, and McHugh produced the movie under their production banner, Avenging Conscience. Prior to this, the trio had created Alferd Packer: The Musical—later renamed Cannibal! The Musical—a Western black comedy filmed during their time at the University of Colorado Boulder. Parker began drafting Orgazmo while still working on Cannibal! and continued refining the script as the group relocated from Colorado to Los Angeles in the mid-1990s.

The movie is a metaphor for that experience, emerging from the Midwest as fresh-faced newcomers trying to make it the underbelly of the Hollywood studio system. Setting the film in the porn industry was a way to double the outrageousness of the concept. Stone called the film an "innocent and sweet examination of a totally demented and weird business." They landed representation through the William Morris Agency, and spent their early years trying to sell the script. They booked meetings to pitch the film to distributors such as TriStar and Caravan Pictures; Stone recalled that executives were confused and resistant to its content. He said that it was only when they met the film's producer, Fran Rubel Kuzui, that the project took off. Half of the budget for the picture came from a Japanese porn company called Kuki, who wanted to feature its performers in mainstream Western media. In partnering with veterans of the porn industry, they were surprised to find them less "sleazy" than the Hollywood types they had met. A party was held at the Playboy Mansion to celebrate the release of the film in 1998; Metallica played in a tent set up on the grounds.

== Release ==
Orgazmo premiered at the Toronto International Film Festival in 1997. Independent distributor October Films purchased the rights to the film for one million dollars after the screening. The film received an NC-17 rating from the Motion Picture Association of America, which resulted in the poor box office performance of the film. The Motion Picture Association of America gave the film an NC-17 rating, resulting in a very limited release in the US. Parker and Stone attempted to negotiate with the organization on what to delete from the final print, but the MPAA would not give specific notes. The duo theorized that the organization cared less because it was an independent distributor which would bring it significantly less money.

An unrated version was released on the two-sided DVD set along with the theatrical version; it is two minutes shorter than the original 94-minute release. The film was released via Blu-ray on May 12, 2015. This includes both versions of the film and all the features from the DVD.

== Critical reception ==
As of September 2022, the review-aggregation website Rotten Tomatoes gave the film a score of 48% and an average rating of 4.90/10 based on 33 reviews. The website's critical consensus read: "More juvenile than provocative, Orgazmo may have enough good-natured raunch to satisfy writer-director Trey Parker's fans, but its satire is too soft to compete with the South Park co-creator's best work." As of September 2020, the film had a score of 48 out of 100 on Metacritic based on 17 critics, indicating "mixed or average reviews".

Roger Ebert gave the film half a star out of four, arguing that Orgazmo had little of the clever wit Parker and Stone brought to South Park and calling it "callow, gauche, obvious and awkward, and designed to appeal to those with similar qualities". James Berardinelli gave the film three out of four stars, calling it "crude, rude, profane, and funny" and the kind of movie that makes "for a great event at parties". Reviewing for Entertainment Weekly, Ty Burr found the film middling, but praised the performance of Dian Bachar.

Orgazmo has been deemed a cult film, mostly by fans of South Park, which Parker and Stone subsequently released to critical acclaim. Its reception and rating by the MPAA is discussed in the 2006 documentary This Film Is Not Yet Rated.

== See also ==
- Bat Pussy
- Flesh Gordon
- Portrayals of Mormons in popular media
