= Harry Heye Tammen =

American businessman and journalist (1856–1924)

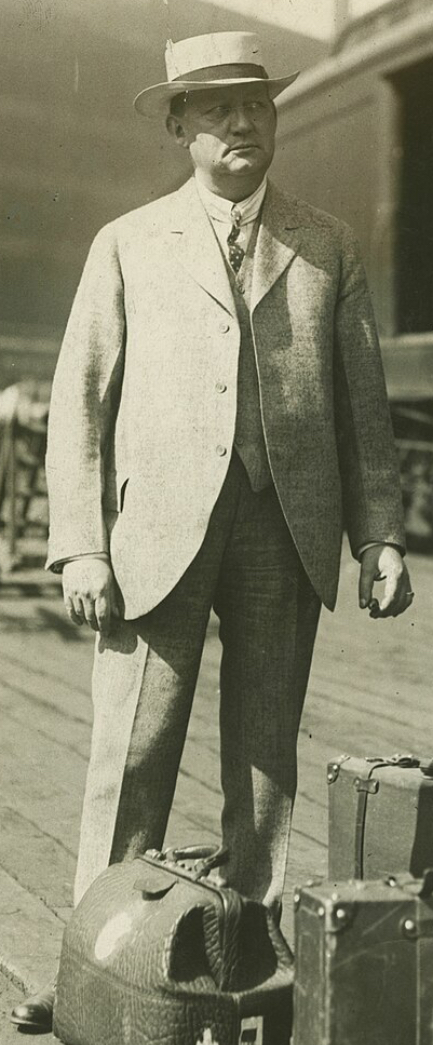
- Tammen in 1913
- Born: Heinrich Heye Tammen; March 6, 1856; Baltimore, Maryland, US
- Died: July 19, 1924 (68 years old); Denver, Colorado, US
- Burial place: Fairmount Cemetery
- Other names: H. H. Tammen
- Occupations: Businessman; journalist; publisher
- Employer: The Denver Post
- Parents: Heye Henrich (father); Caroline Henrietta Piepenbruker (mother)

Heinrich Heye "Tam" Tammen (March 6, 1856 – July 19, 1924) was an American journalist, publisher, and businessman. He worked alongside Frederick Gilmer Bonfils and co-owned The Denver Post, the Kansas City Post, and the Sells Floto Circus.

== Early life ==
Tammen was born on March 6, 1856, in Baltimore. His father was a pharmacist and supposed attaché for the Netherlands named Heye Henrich. His mother was named Caroline Henrietta (née Piepenbruker). Both were immigrants from Hanover, Germany.

He grew up working for beer gardens and became a bartender before he was 21. He moved to Philadelphia, then to Denver in 1880 to continue bartending at the Windsor Hotel. In 1881, he founded the H. H. Tammen Curio Company. The company sold inauthentic skookum dolls, Navajo blankets, arrowheads, and other fake Native American memorabilia.

== Journalism ==
While working at the Windsor Hotel, Tammen met his business partner, Fredrick Gilmer Bonfils. Tammen and Bonfils—known collectively as "Tam and Bon"—bought The Denver Post in 1895.

With their silent partner, J. Ogden Armour, they also acquired the Kansas City Post. They owned The Post until 1922, when they sold it to Walter S. Dickey, who combined it with the Kansas City Journal, and made the Kansas City Journal-Post.

They also bought the Sells Brothers Circus. After buying the circus, Tammen renamed it to the Sells Floto circus, naming it after Otto Floto, because he liked the name Floto. Tammen and Bonfils owned the circus until 1921, when they sold it to the American Circus Corporation.

In December 1899, he and Bonfils were shot by W. W. Anderson, an attourney representing Alferd Packer. Tammen's life was saved by newspaper editor Polly Pry, who used her skirt to bandage the wounds.

In 1900, Tammen and Bonfils were involved in the Teapot Dome scandal, after they received $250,000 in bribes from Harry Ford Sinclair to not report on the oil drilling in Teapot Rock.

Tammen was a close friend with mobster Lou Blonger. After he was arrested, Tammen refused to publish a story about it. Bonfils insisted a story be published, calling it a "Million-Dollar Bunco Ring".

Tammen died on July 19, 1924 in Denver, Colorado, aged 68, and was buried in Fairmount Cemetery.
