= Jason McHugh =

American television producer and actor (born 1968)

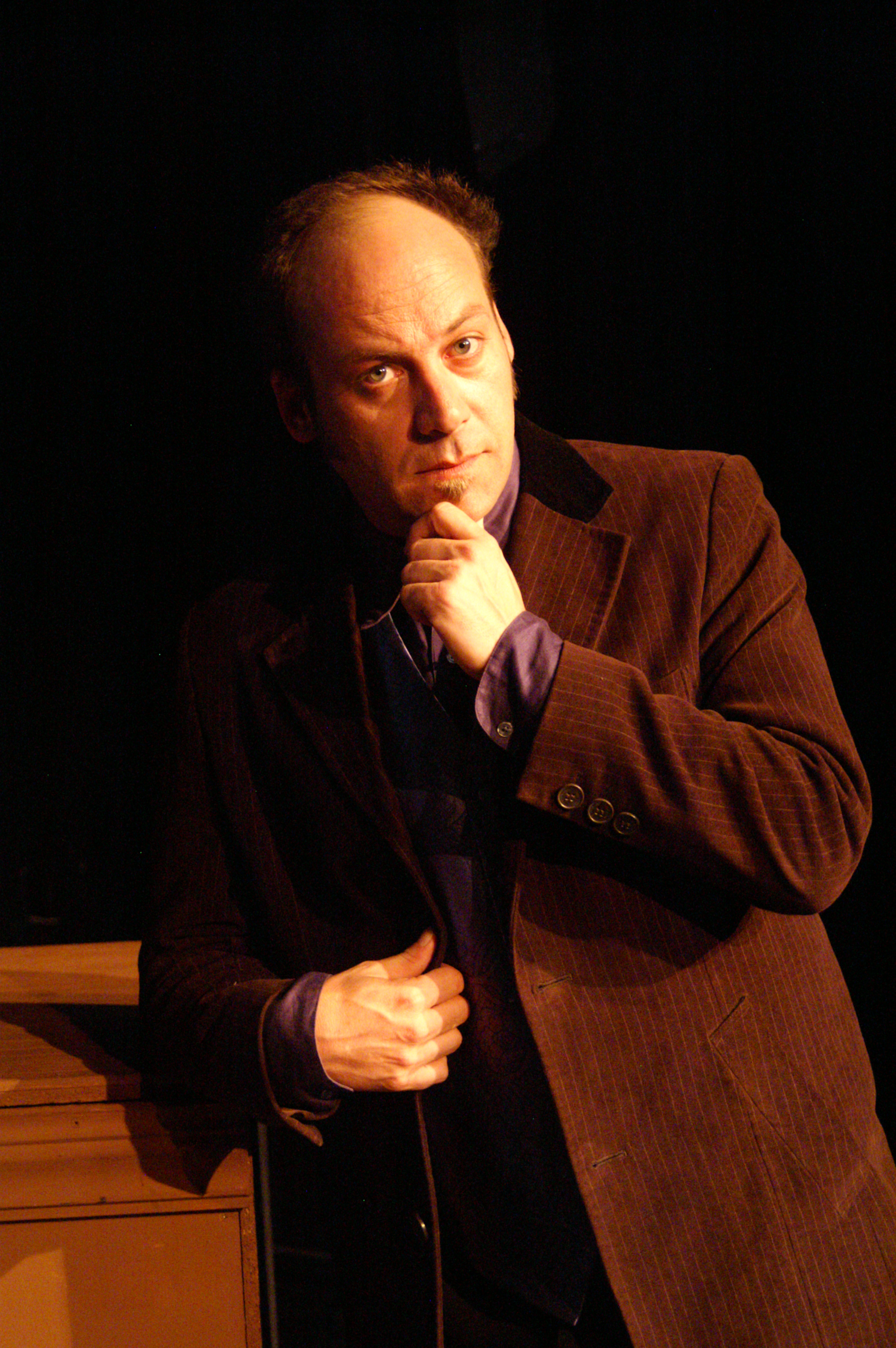
- Jason McHugh as Mr Mills, August 2008
- Born: October 10, 1968 (age 57); Chicago, Illinois, U.S.
- Occupations: Actor, director, writer, producer
- Years active: 1994 - present

Jason McHugh (born October 10, 1968) is an American television producer and actor, best known for his work with Trey Parker and Matt Stone. He produced both Cannibal! The Musical and Orgazmo and played Frank Miller in Cannibal! and part of the porno crew in Orgazmo.

He also has done incidental voices on Parker and Stone's hit animated show South Park. McHugh wrote and directed Mindfield which was a text messaging prankster game created by Perry Farrell for Lollapalooza.

He produced and acted in Les Claypool's mockumentary Electric Apricot, working alongside Matt Stone, Cannibal star Dian Bachar, and South Park writer Kyle McCulloch.

In 2008, he made his UK stage debut playing Mr. Mills in the stage production of Cannibal! The Musical at The George Square Theatre, Edinburgh. He played the part for 3 performances.

In 2011, he released a book titled Shpadoinkle: The Making of Cannibal! The Musical, which chronicles the making of Cannibal!
