= The Legend of Alfred Packer =

1980 film

- Video release cover
- Directed by: Jim Roberson
- Screenplay by: Burton Raffel; Chuck Meyers
- Story by: Burton Raffel
- Produced by: Mark J. Webb
- Starring: Patrick Dray; Ronald Haines; Jim Dratfield; Bob Damon; Dave Ellingson; Ron Holiday; Lawrence Bleir; Cynthia Nessin
- Cinematography: James Warren
- Edited by: Shirak Kojayan
- Music by: Jaime Mendoza-Nava
- Production company: Packer Productions Ltd.
- Distributed by: American National Enterprises
- Release date: 1980 (United States)
- Running time: 93 minutes
- Country: United States
- Language: English

The Legend of Alfred Packer is a 1980 American biographical Western film directed by Jim Roberson from a script by Burton Raffel. It is a biopic of Alferd Packer starring Patrick Dray in the title role. The film features a score by Bolivian composer Jaime Mendoza-Nava, though the main theme is derivative of Mason Williams's "Classical Gas".

The "Alferd" spelling and pronunciation of his first name is not used in the film.

== Plot ==
McMurphy comes to Denver, Colorado, to see Polly Pry about the Packer case. As Pry leaves for her scheduled meeting with McMurphy, she is stalked and shot at by a gunman. The bullets hit her skirts and lessen the blows inflicted on her publishers behind her. McMurphy and Pry meet in a tavern to discuss the Packer story over whiskey. She begins with the five prospectors who will become victims meeting up for the first time at a boardinghouse, where the landlady tells them that Alfred Packer is the best guide in the area.

The men find Packer in a small prison, and pay his bail so that he can be their guide. They join with the larger group, but are soon split up, and they get suckered into the hospitality of a trapper and his sidekick, Weasel, who intend to rape George Noon. Packer and the men escape, but get hopelessly lost in Ute territory. When Packer is scouting ahead, he returns to find that Shannon Wilson Bell, a Mormon missionary, has killed and begun to eat the other prospectors. Packer and Bell fight; Bell falls, landing on a knife, and is killed.

After several months, Packer comes out of the mountains into the nearest town and makes his report to General Adams. Later, while at Dolan's Bar, his story having been investigated, he is captured and brought to trial. The remainder of the film depicts his trial. Judge Gerry reads his sentence as per the court records, though omitting the two consecutive repeats of "dead." As Packer walks through the courthouse door, a blue glow emanates from behind it, the image freezes, and, in voiceover and overlain title cards, Pry briefly summarizes what happened to Packer after the trial.

== Cast ==
- Dave Ellingson as James Humphrey
- Patrick Dray as Alfred G. Packer
- Ronald Haines as Shannon Wilson Bell
- Jim Dratfield as George "California" Noon
- Bob Damon as Israel Swan
- Ron Holiday as Frank "Reddy" Miller
- Lawrence Bleir as McMurphy
- Cynthia Nessin as Polly Pry
- Tom Peru as O.D. Loutsenhizer
- Don Donovan as General Adams
- Dick Morgan as Trapper
- George Farrar as Weasel
- Sam Kirbens as Judge Gerry
- Ruth Seder as Landlady

== Home media ==
The film was released on VHS by Monterey Home Video.

In 2008, it was packaged in an eight-film DVD set, "Legends of the West", with Johnny Yuma, Joshua, Gatling Gun, Big Bad John, Find a Place to Die, Grand Duel, and China 9, Liberty 37.

== Reception ==
The film was deemed ’not very interesting’ but ’highlighted by on-location scenic filming’

== See also ==
- Cannibalism in popular culture
- Cannibal! The Musical
- Ravenous
