= Otto Floto =

American sports journalist (1863–1929)

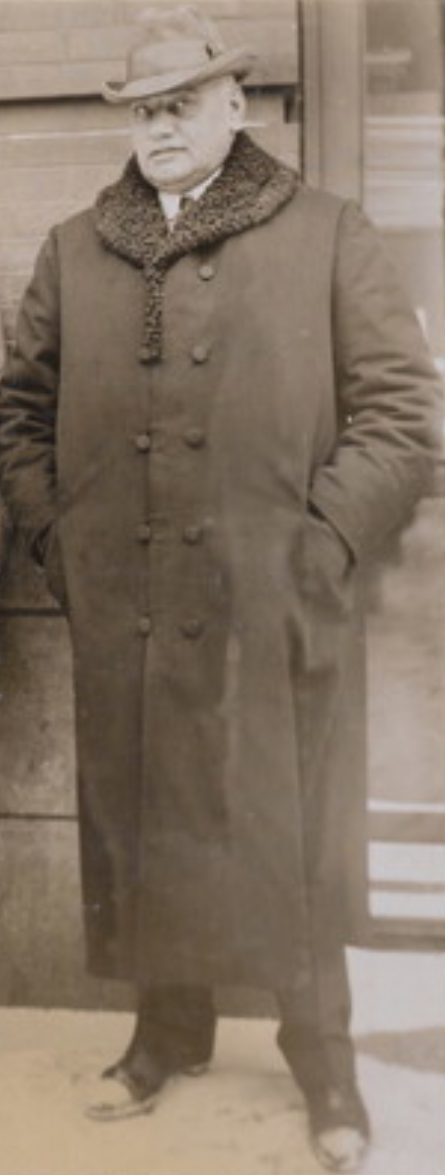
- Floto in 1909
- Born: Otto Clement Floto; 1863; Cincinnati, Ohio, US
- Died: 14 July 1929 (aged 66); Denver, Colorado, US
- Occupations: Sports journalist Promoter
- Employer: The Denver Post

Otto Clement Floto (1863 – July 14, 1929) was an American sports journalist and sports promoter who worked as a sportswriter for The Denver Post. Floto was the namesake for the Sells Floto Circus, which Floto promoted.

== Early life ==
Otto Clement Floto was born in Cincinnati in 1863. In early 1896, he moved to Cripple Creek, Colorado. Before becoming a sports editor, he worked as a billposter and saloon owner. While living in Cripple Creek, he dated a dance hall worker named Jennie LaRue. On April 25, 1896, an argument between them resulted in an oil lamp being thrown at a curtain, which started a fire that burned down most buildings on the street.

== Career and later life ==
Floto was hired to The Denver Post by Harry Heye Tammen as a columnist for sports journalism. He was a weak writer, and his articles had to be rewritten by other editors.

Floto worked as an advisor for Jack Dempsey and John L. Sullivan. He was a rival to Denver sports journalist Bat Masterson, after Floto duped him in a business deal. In July 1900, they got into a street brawl where they kicked each other in the groin.

In 1903, when Tammen and Frederick Gilmer Bonfils bought the Sells Brothers Circus, Tammen renamed it to the "Sells Floto Circus", which Floto promoted. The name was changed because Tammen liked the name Floto.

Floto fell ill in 1928, and died from an epilepsy on July 14, 1929, in Denver, Colorado, aged 66.
