= Polly Pry =

American reporter (1857–1938)

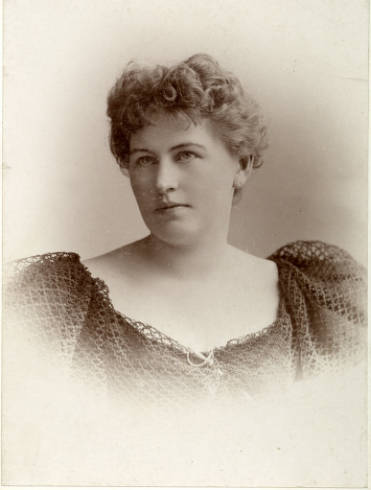
- Born: Leonel Campbell Ross O'Bryan; 1857
- Died: July 16, 1938 (aged 80–81)
- Occupation: Reporter
- Known for: Connection to the case of Alfred Packer

Leonel Campbell Ross O'Bryan (1857–16 July 1938), known under the pen name Polly Pry, was a controversial reporter for The Denver Post and later as a freelancer in the late nineteenth and early twentieth centuries. She is best known for her connection to the case of Alfred Packer as an investigative reporter.

== Early life ==
Pry was born to a wealthy family in 1857. Aged fifteen, she eloped to Mexico with a railroad industrialist named George Anthony. Five years later, Pry left Anthony and moved to New York to become a reporter. While initially being rejected by The New York Times, she succeeded in getting a trial assignment on a recent slum fire. The article she then produced was good enough to earn her a full time job there.

In 1898, Pry was hired by Frederick Bonfils for the Denver Post, becoming the paper's first female reporter. She was a member of the Denver Woman's Press Club.

== Relationship with Packer ==
Pry met Alfred Packer in 1901 while she was writing an article on the prison where he was incarcerated. She advocated for him in print throughout the trial, helping to win his release.

After the trial, she was present during a confrontation between the attorney for Packer, and the owners of the Post, who had hired him. The owners learned that the attorney had taken a double payment, and demanded he return the money. During the confrontation, the attorney, W. W. Anderson, pulled a gun and shot both of the men; as he prepared to shoot again she jumped in front of Harry Heye Tammen, trying to shield him. Anderson threatened to shoot her if she didn't move. However, she stalled him long enough for the police to arrive and used her skirt to stop the bleeding. Later, rumors began circulating that her skirts saved her publishers' lives by slowing down bullets from the gun.

== Later life ==
Pry was a relentless critic of unions, writing that they were “antagonistic to the business interests of their employers and indifferent to the welfare of the community,”. She also heaped scorn on prominent union figures such as Mother Jones, writing "Mother Jones - mother of idleness and want and misery! God send us barrenness of motherhood if such as Jones be the alternative."

Pry was fired from The Denver Post in 1903 for her stance on labor issues and immigration, which displeased her pro-union employers (they were also displeased that union workers boycotted the Post.) Pry subsequently founded her own eponymous paper, Polly Pry, which was published between 1903 and 1905. Her writing in this journal led to anonymous death threats and a further attack by a gunman, this time in her home rather than her workplace. The shots that were fired at Pry when she opened her door on January 10 1904 both missed her, and the failed assassin fled.

She closed down her paper in 1905, and returned to New York City for a time. After a few years in New York, she accepted a job as a reporter the Denver Times, and interviewed Pancho Villa in Mexico and later covered World War I from Europe. She was a strong advocate of free speech and came to the aid of French war orphans during World War I.

She continued working into her sixties.

Pry died on 16 July 1938, aged eighty.

== In popular culture ==
Two film versions of the Alferd Packer story have included Polly Pry. In Jim Roberson's The Legend of Alfred Packer (1980), she was portrayed by Cynthia Nessin. The incident with Anderson (who was not named, and called "Gunman" in the credits) was included, but after she begins telling Packer's story, she does not appear again in the film, involved or otherwise, and the shooting is not mentioned again. She is depicted as a hard-drinking and forceful person. Trey Parker's Cannibal! The Musical featured Toddy Walters in the role, which went more deeply into her involvement with the case but ignored the fact that she was married in order to make her a love interest for Packer.
