= Toddy Walters =

American singer-songwriter

Toddy Elizabeth Walters
- Born: October 24, 1969 (age 56); Denver, Colorado, U.S.
- Education: University of Colorado
- Occupations: Actress; singer; songwriter

Toddy Elizabeth Walters (born October 24, 1969, in Denver, Colorado) is an actress, singer and songwriter.

== Career ==
A Denver native, Toddy Walters has been a singer, songwriter and actor for the majority of her life.

Walters went to the University of Colorado, where she met Trey Parker, who was casting for his first live action film, Cannibal! The Musical. She was cast in the role of Polly Pry. Parker and Walters dated over the course of the film's production, as well as that of Parker's next film, Orgazmo, a much larger-scale production. The two eventually broke up, but Walters still made appearances in Parker and Stone's animated series, South Park, in the series' feature film adaptation playing Winona Ryder, as well as their short lived series That's My Bush.

As a singer/songwriter, her debut album Grotto, produced at Denver's Sleeping Brotherhood studios, was released in 1997. Walters moved to Los Angeles in 1998 and worked in the entertainment industry as a production assistant on commercials and feature films. In 2001, she toured with BT as a singer, and subsequently collaborated with Paul & Price on several albums and commercials. Planet Satsuma, produced by Bernhard Penzias, was released October 24, 2007. She was the main vocalist for the soundtrack of John Carpenter's The Ward, music written by Mark Kilian (2010). From 2015-2018 Toddy founded and performed an Amy Winehouse tribute band, called Winehouse (an Embodiment of Amy Winehouse).

In 2018, Walters starred in the dark comedy Stadium Anthems, shot in her hometown of Denver. In addition to acting in the film, she served as music supervisor, contributing original songs.

She currently resides in Basalt, Colorado, with her partner, and is an active performer in regional plays and devised theater.

== South Park appearances ==
- "Death" as the singing voice as Enya
- "Tom's Rhinoplasty" as the singing voice as Indigo Girls
- "Cartman's Mom Is a Dirty Slut" as the singing voice
- "Cartman's Mom is Still a Dirty Slut" as Nurse Goodly
- "Chef's Salty Chocolate Balls" as Phyllis
- "Chef Aid" as Alanis Morissette
- "Merry Christmas Charlie Manson!" as Mr. Hankey's Helper
- "Rainforest Shmainforest" as Kelly
- "Tweek vs. Craig" as Home Economics teacher
- South Park: Bigger, Longer & Uncut as Winona Ryder
