= W. W. Anderson =

American attorney (1845–?)

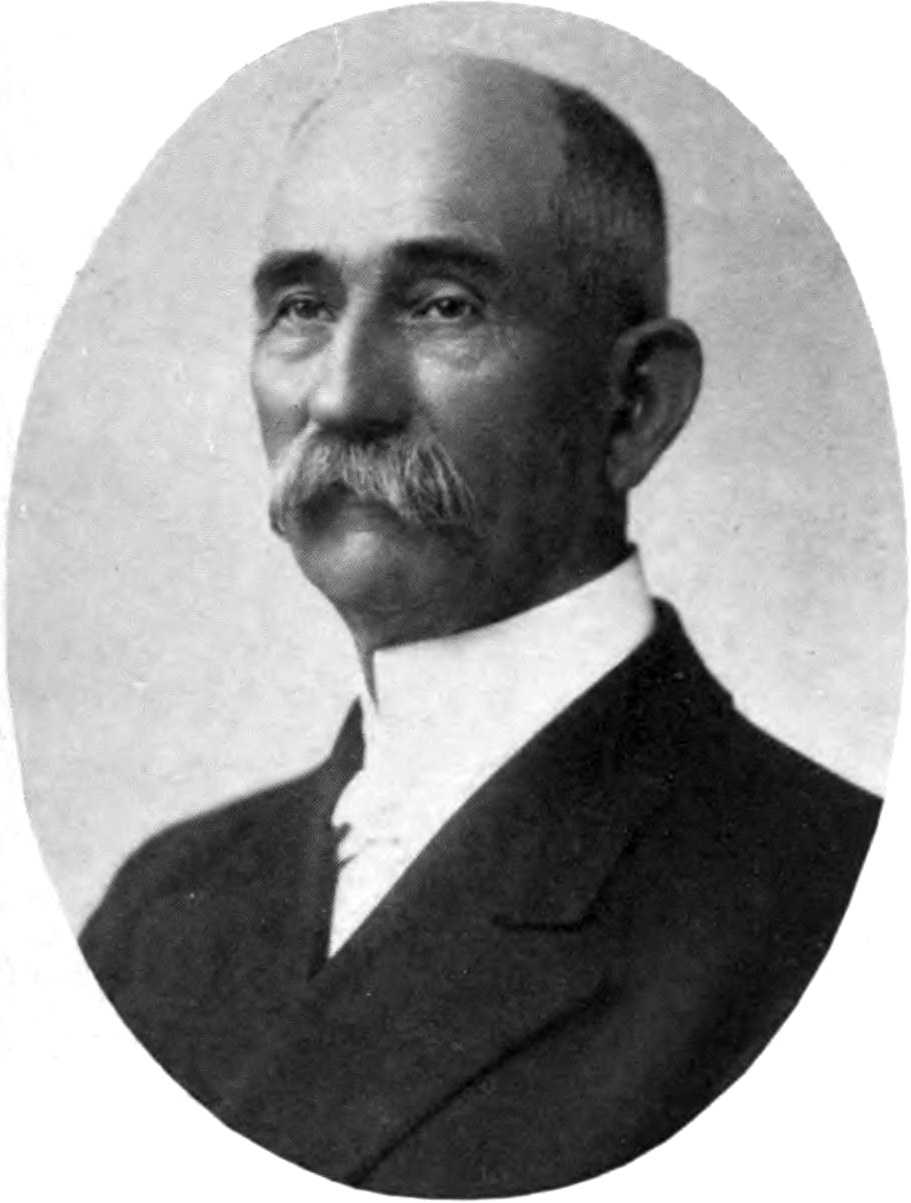
- Anderson's portrait for the Colorado Bar Association
- Born: August 19, 1845; Fredericksburg, Virginia, US
- Other name: Plughat
- Education: Bethany College
- Occupation: Attorney
- Known for: Shooting the publishers of The Denver Post
- Spouse: Cornelia E. Van Horn (married 1872–1888)
- Children: 3

William W. "Plughat" Anderson (August 19, 1845 – ?) was an American attorney. He is best known for representing Alfred Packer in his trial for murder, and for attempting to shoot Harry Heye Tammen and Frederick Gilmer Bonfils of The Denver Post after employee reporter Polly Pry accused his client of cannibalism.

== Early life and education ==
Anderson was born August 19, 1845, in Fredericksburg, Virginia. He graduated from Bethany College in West Virginia. When he was young, he moved to Louisiana, Missouri. While living there, he was admitted to The Missouri Bar and became a lawyer in 1869. He married Cornelia E. Van Horn in December 1872, and they had three children together. He became a district attorney and financial accountant. He also served on the town council, and became mayor. In 1888, he was removed from the town and was forced to move to Denver, Colorado.

In 1899, While living in Denver, Colorado, Anderson was admitted to the Colorado Bar Association. Anderson was also a member of the Masonic bodies.

Anderson's house, known as the 'Anderson House', was located in Jefferson Park, Denver. It was demolished in 2016.

== The Denver Post shooting ==
In December 1889 or January 1900, Anderson was representing Alfred Packer in his trial for murder. Amidst the trial, The Denver Post reporter Polly Pry wrote an article on the case, accusing Packer of cannibalism. In response, Anderson went to the headquarters of The Denver Post with a gun, and shot the two publishers; Harry Heye Tammen in the arm, and Frederick Gilmer Bonfils in the neck twice. Tammen survived the shooting only because Pry stalled Anderson until the police arrived. Anderson was released from police custody and acquitted of his crimes due to habeas corpus.
