= Apple doll =

North American folk craft

An apple doll

An apple doll, also known as an apple-head or applehead doll, is a North American folk craft in which the doll's head is made from a dried apple. In modern times, apple dolls are mostly used as decorations or to display craftsmanship, rather than as children's toys.

== History ==
In colonial America, children's toys were often fashioned from utilitarian objects and materials on hand such as corn husks, clothes-pins and rags, using ingenuity and imagination. The use of apples as doll heads was a Native American practice and may have originated among the Iroquois or Seneca people.

As colonists came into contact with Native peoples, they copied their dolls; Native peoples also began to make brightly and elaborately costumed apple-head dolls to sell to tourists. Skookum dolls in Native dress, which were popular novelties between 1913 and the early 1960s, were originally made with apple heads; however their creator, Mary Dwyer McAboy, was not Native.

== Method of making ==
The doll is made in two parts: the head and the body. To make the head, an apple is peeled, then the flesh is carved or pressed using a spoon and paring knife to create the facial features of the doll. In some early examples, the facial features and expressions were produced by pinching the apple as it began to shrink.

Next the apple is pierced to the core with a wire and left to dry for up to 30 days. It can be immersed in lemon juice for a day to prevent its turning black. However, the apple will naturally darken in colour during the drying process, and will shrink to about a third its original size. As it shrinks the surface will wrinkle like an old person's face, giving character to the facial expression. One maker, Margaret Owens, explained that only after an apple dried did she decide whether to make the doll male or female, and that sometimes the face becomes misshapen during the drying process and she has to throw the apple away.

When the apple is completely dry, white beads or grains of rice can be pushed into the mouth to serve as teeth, and buttons or sequins can be added to serve as eyes. Hair for the doll can be made from wool, yarn, fleece, cotton batting, faux fur, or human hair collected from a hairbrush. This is first glued to a piece of felt, which is then glued to the top of the apple.

The finished head is positioned on the top of a wire armature which is shaped into the rest of the doll's body, and padded using rags, paper or wadding. The doll's hands are sometimes modelled using a clay made from bread. The body is then covered by the doll's clothing, which is usually sewn by hand to the maker's tastes.
