= Skookum doll =

Native American themed doll

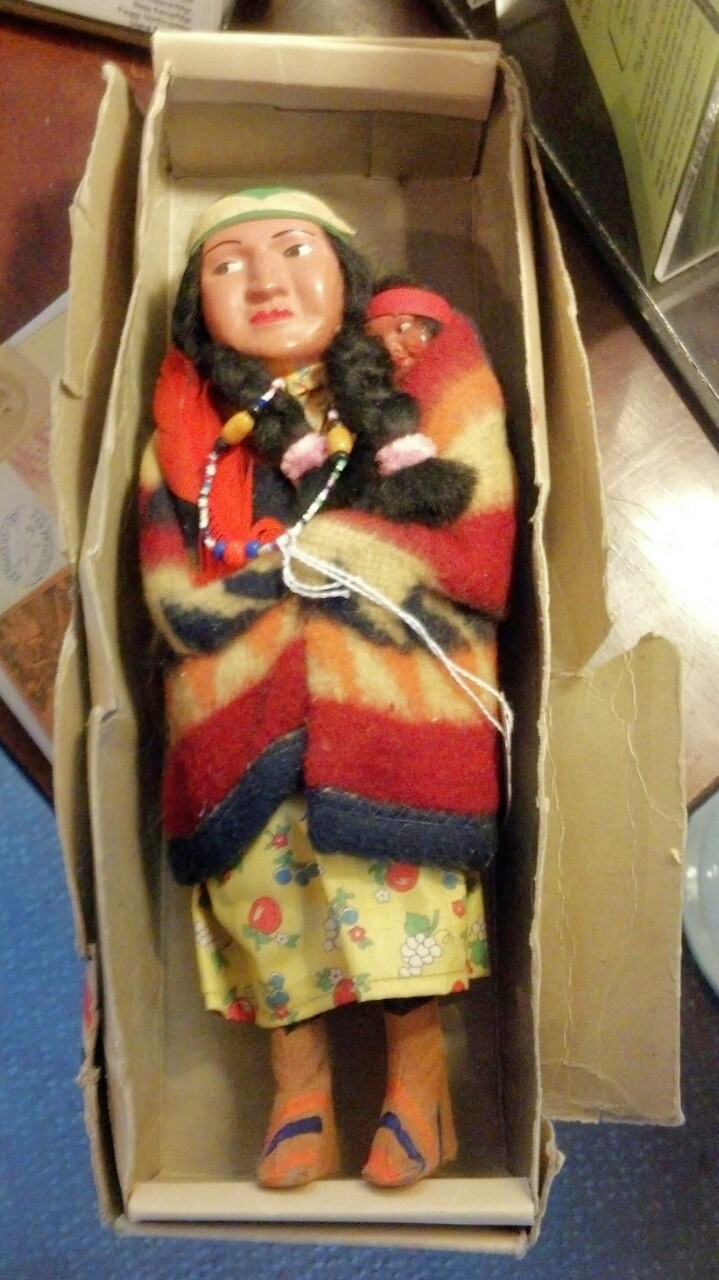
A Skookum doll in its original box

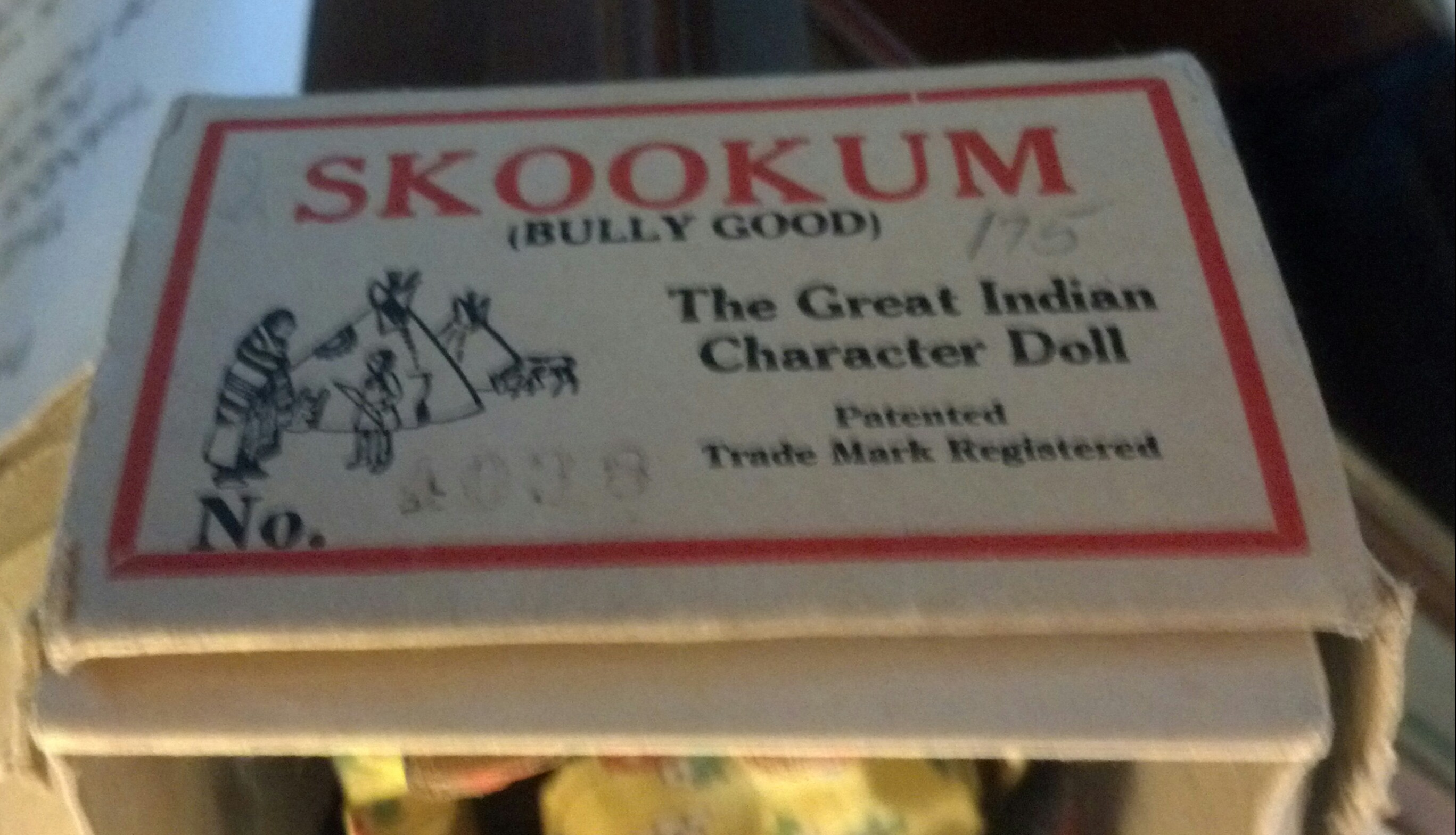
An original label

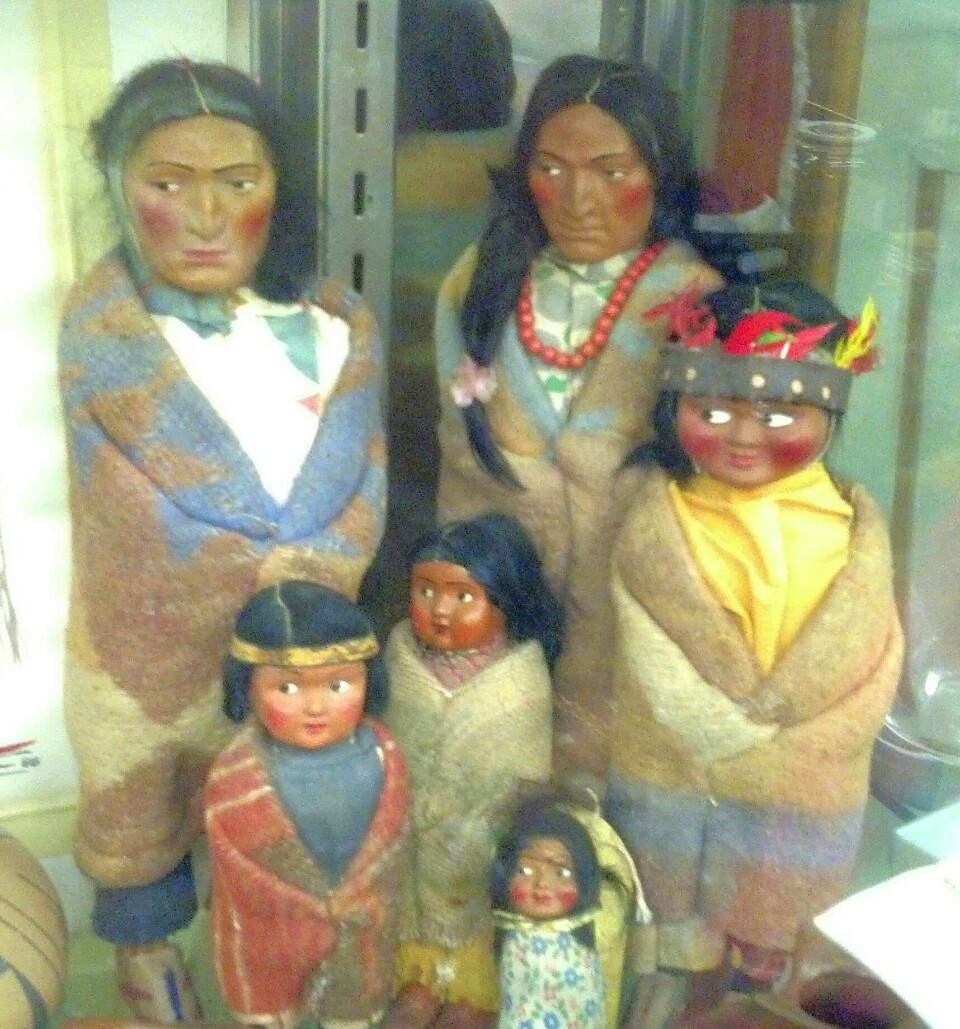
Skookum dolls

A Skookum doll was a Native American themed doll, sold as a souvenir item in the early 20th century. Although considered collectible, they are not authentic Native American dolls, as they were designed and created by a white woman, and quickly mass-produced by her company, Skookum.

== History ==
Mary Dwyer McAboy (1876-1961), who was from Missoula, Montana, learned to carve apple head dolls as a child from her mother. According to an account by McAboy, her mother had sold apple dolls at church socials and sewing circles.

Mary Dwyer had worked as a schoolteacher before marrying Frank E. McAboy in 1909. Her husband died of tuberculosis four years later, in 1913.

Later that year, Mary McAboy began to market apple head dolls dressed in Indian costumes, and achieved rapid commercial success. According to McAboy, her career as a doll maker began when she made an Indian village which she displayed in the window of a grocery store. Vaudeville actress Fritzi Scheff was performing in Missoula at the time, saw the display, and purchased it for "actual money". McAboy duplicated the display, which also sold quickly, and she then began selling increasing numbers of the dolls. She publicized her growing business through western newspapers, and arranged a display at a women's suffrage office in New York City, gaining press coverage there.

She had difficulty processing large numbers of apples, as excessive moisture led to rotting. She consulted with chemists at Montana State University in an attempt to control the problem. But demand grew so rapidly that she moved to mass production techniques within a year, and soon almost all of the doll heads were made out of composition, composed mostly of sawdust and glue. A product that began as women's handicraft had rapidly shifted to factory production with mostly male workers. From that time on, the dolls were manufactured by Harry Heye Tammen in Los Angeles, and distributed in the east by the Arrow Novelty Company in New York City. Starting in the 1940s, the faces were made of plastic. McAboy supervised production of the dolls until she retired in 1952.

One method of determining the production date of the dolls is by studying the footwear. For example, the earliest dolls from around 1913 had moccasins made of leather. By 1918, the mocassins were simulated with suede applied to wood, and painted designs. By 1924, they were molded of composition material, and by the 1950s, the dolls had plastic feet. Production of the dolls ended in the early 1960s.

== Characteristics ==
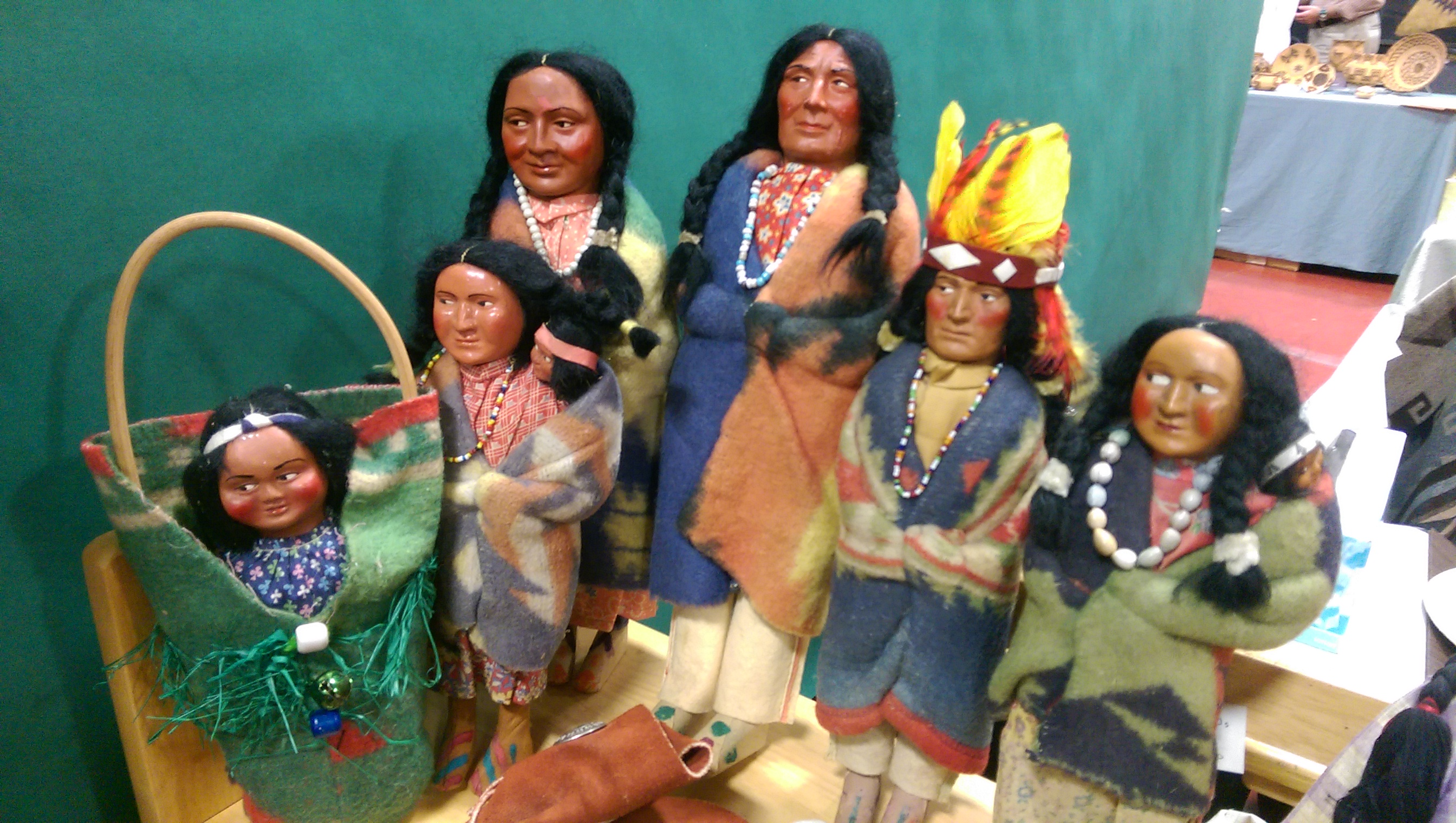
Skookum dolls on display in San Rafael, California in 2016

The dolls were made in a variety of sizes, ranging from small babies about 2" long, with an attached mailing tag, up to 36" high store display versions. Early versions had wigs made of human hair, while later, the wigs were made of mohair. In most cases, the eyes were looking to the right, but rarely, they were looking to the left. The dolls did not have arms or hands, as they were always wrapped in felt blankets reminiscent of Hudson's Bay point blankets, Pendleton blankets or Navajo blankets. Accessories included strings of glass or wooden beads, buckskin headbands, and drums. The dolls were often packaged in distinctive boxes, with the slogan (Bully Good), and were described in marketing materials as "The Great Indian Character Doll".

The dolls were costumed in stylized garb of many different tribes, including the Pueblo, the Sioux, the Apache and the Chippewa.

== See also ==
- Skookum
