= Alfred Packer =

American prospector and cannibal

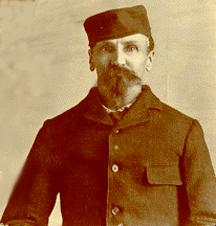
- Packer in 1874
- Born: Alfred Griner Packer; January 21, 1842; Allegheny County, Pennsylvania, U.S.
- Died: April 23, 1907 (aged 65); Jefferson County, Colorado, U.S.
- Other names: John Schwartze; Colorado Cannibal
- Known for: Cannibalism
- Status: Deceased
- Convictions: Murder (overturned); Voluntary manslaughter (5 counts)
- Penalty: Death; commuted to 40 years imprisonment

Alfred Griner Packer (Note: The spelling of Alfred Packer's name has been the source of much confusion over the years. Official documents give his name as Alfred Packer. Packer sometimes signed his name as "Alferd", sometimes as "Alfred", and is referred to by both names. In many documents, he is referred to simply as A. Packer or Al Packer. His headstone reads Alfred Packer.) (January 21, 1842 – April 23, 1907), also known as the "Colorado Cannibal", was an American prospector and self-proclaimed wilderness guide who confessed to cannibalism during the winter of 1874. Though no clear or definitive evidence has yet been found, and despite in-depth research about proof of his deeds, he is one of the four persons historically convicted for cannibalism in the United States. After emerging as the sole survivor of a six-man party who had attempted to travel through the San Juan Mountains of the Colorado Territory, he eventually confessed to having lived off the flesh of his companions, giving more than one version of his account as to the circumstances.

After his story was called into question, Packer escaped jail and hid from justice for nine years. He was eventually tried, convicted of premeditated murder, and sentenced to death. Packer won a retrial, and was eventually sentenced to 40 years in prison on five counts of voluntary manslaughter. An almost completely fictitious biopic of his exploits, The Legend of Alfred Packer, was released in 1980. A more comedic and heavily fabricated take on the story, titled Cannibal! The Musical, was released in 1993.

== Early life ==
Alfred Griner Packer was born in an unincorporated area of Allegheny County, Pennsylvania, near Pittsburgh, on January 21, 1842. He was one of three children born to James Packer, and Esther Packer (née Griner). By the early 1850s, Packer's father had moved his family to LaGrange County, Indiana, where he worked as a cabinetmaker. Packer is said to have had a bitter relationship with his parents, and in his late teens he moved to Minnesota and worked as a shoemaker.

== Career ==
Packer served in the Union army during the American Civil War. He enlisted on April 22, 1862, in Winona, Minnesota, and was assigned to Company F of the 16th Infantry Regiment. Eight months later he was honorably discharged due to epilepsy, which had triggered seizures. On June 25, 1863, Packer enlisted in the 8th Iowa Cavalry Regiment at Ottumwa, Iowa, only for his epilepsy to result in a second discharge on April 22, 1864.

Packer then traveled west, and worked at numerous jobs over the next nine years. These professions included being a hunter, wagon teamster, ranch hand, and field worker, but his seizures and overall attitude ensured that he never kept a job for long. Packer also worked for a couple of months as a guide, but those who knew him at this time later stated that he was ill-suited to the role and was prone to losing his way. He ended up working mining-related jobs, drifting from mine to mine, but never found prosperity through the industry. He worked for a short time in the Colorado Territory as a miner but, having no luck, moved on to the Utah Territory.

Most who knew Packer generally disliked and distrusted him, owing to his argumentative personality, his nearly pathological lying, and his reputation for theft.

== Expedition ==
Having heard of gold that had been discovered in Breckenridge, Robert McGrue found a party of 20 ready to join him and make the trip from Salt Lake City to the San Juan Mountains, south of Colorado Territory. The men, who were largely strangers to each other, left by November 1873. One of them, George Tracy, declared that the party encountered a 23-year-old man called Alfred Packer near Provo. After they told him they were headed to the gold country of the San Juan Mountains, Packer said he would like to join them, claiming he was both a prospector and a guide, and that he knew the San Juan territory well. As he had no provisions, he offered $25 to join the band. The prospectors, who needed a guide, accepted Packer's help.

On the first part of the trip to the San Juan Mountains, members of McGrue's party later said he had apparently overstated his experience of being familiar to the area, or had even possibly fabricated his qualifications altogether. He was also reported as being without a rifle at the time the expedition left, having only a Colt revolver with him. Throughout the course of their journey, Packer was reported as being greedy with rations, lazy, and obstinate. He apparently was obsessed with how much money the members had brought with them for the journey. He was reported to have quarreled constantly with party member Frank Miller. At the time of his first trial, Packer was characterized as a "whining fraud" by party member Preston Nutter. His epileptic seizures also made his presence in the group apparently strenuous. Moreover, there were rumours about Packer having spent time in jail in Salt Lake City, on the charge of having murdered a hunting partner.

Despite the presence of Packer as a guide, the party progressed more slowly than expected towards Breckenridge. The winter proved to be a major obstacle for them, crippling wagons and horses. While progressing along the Spanish Trail they encountered heavy snow which hid the path, forcing the party members to rely almost solely on a compass. Packer's inexperience was also beginning to show itself, and the party ultimately became lost. Provisions quickly ran out, and the men were reduced to surviving first on horse feed, and were nearing the point where they would consider eating the horses themselves.

=== Chief Ouray's camp ===
On January 21, 1874, the party came upon the encampment of Chief Ouray, known as the White Man's Friend, near Montrose, Colorado, set in the Uncompahgre Valley. Though desperate, the party still approached the camp with anxiety, unsure of how they would be received by the tribe. However, Chief Ouray supplied them with food and lodging and recommended they postpone their expedition until spring, since they were likely to encounter dangerous winter weather in the mountains. He told them that no Ute would attempt such a journey, and that to chance it would be to risk almost certain death. Ouray offered to allow the men to stay with his tribe until the winter had passed, and promised to share all that he and his people had with them. Regardless of these warnings, 11 men decided to proceed on. They intended to travel first to the Los Pinós Indian Agency, which was the closest outpost to the camp, and proceed onward to Breckenridge. Chief Ouray provided them with food for their journey, as well as safe directions to bypass the mountains. Packer, however, was in favor of getting to the agency by going through the mountains, stating it was a more direct route. The party cut in two, with five men following Oliver Loutsenhizer along the Gunnison River, and six others, among them Packer, heading through the San Juan Mountains. Had Packer wanted to follow the other group, Loutsenhizer threatened that he would shoot him.

=== Second departure ===
On February 9, Packer and the five others in his party left for the Los Pinós Indian Agency, 75 miles ahead. Besides Packer, the group comprised George "California" Noon, a teenager; Israel Swan, an elderly man rumored to be carrying thousands in cash; James Humphrey; Frank "Butcher" Miller, a butcher from Germany; and the red-haired Shannon Wilson Bell. The fact that no one in the other group opposed the departure of their "guide" has led many researchers to conclude that Packer's inexperience and overall attitude had become quite taxing to them, and that they figured they were better off without him. The leader of the combined parties, Bob McGrue, guided Packer's men along the river route advised by Chief Ouray until his horses could not continue. McGrue unloaded the men's provisions and went back to Ouray's camp. The men continued along the Gunnison River for a time, before Packer took his party along a path higher up in the San Juan Mountains, disregarding Ouray's warning. This decision was made when the men barely had enough food to cover the supposed 14 days it would take to travel the safest route, possessed no snowshoes, had a bare minimum of matches and no flint, and also had no heavy clothing that would help against the extreme cold. They went into the mountains with two rifles, one pistol, a couple of knives, a hatchet, and minimal ammunition.

== Aftermath ==
On April 16, 1874, 65 days after his departure, Packer emerged from the woods alone and made his way across a frozen lake bed to the Los Pinós Indian Agency, near Saguache, Colorado. As the men of the agency were eating breakfast, Packer came in and stood before them begging for food and shelter. He carried with him a rifle, a knife, a steel coffee pot, and a satchel. The men sat Packer down at the table and gave him some food, which he could not ingest without vomiting. Packer said his digestion was altered as a result of his prolonged near-starvation. Then he related to the men the events that had led him from Ouray's camp to Los Piños. He said he had been hired by five men to guide them to Breckenridge. He then stated that during their journey, he had become snow-blind and was left lagging behind the party, becoming a burden for them. Packer claimed that a member of the party, Israel Swan, had supplied him with a rifle, just before the others decided to abandon him. Since this moment he had been forced to survive on his own and make his way out of the mountains with minimal ammunition and virtually no supplies. He indicated he had little else to eat than roots and rose buds the entire time he was alone. He had also eaten his moccasins. The men at the agency listened to his story, but found it rather odd, that even though he had been lost in the wilderness for a little over two months, he did not look as malnourished and threadbare as most lost wanderers they had come across in the mountains. His face was reported as being bloated, and his overall physique hardly skeletal. Moreover, Packer said he would drink whisky for breakfast, instead of any kind of food. Packer claimed he was broke, and sold the Winchester rifle he had in his possession to Major Downer, the agency's justice of the peace, for $10 (equivalent to $285 in 2025). Packer stayed at the agency for ten days before heading to the nearby town of Saguache, where he began to buy supplies for his journey back home in Pennsylvania.

=== Arrival of Preston Nutter ===
When he reached Saguache, Packer bought a horse for $70 (equivalent to $1,992 in 2025) and booked a room at Dolan's Saloon. Larry Dolan, the owner, later claimed that Packer spent around $100 (equivalent to $2,846 in 2025) during his stay, and that Packer even offered to lend him $300. Packer spent an additional $78 in Otto Mears' general store. It was also claimed that he had several different wallets in his possession. He stayed in Saguache until Preston Nutter, a member of the original party who remained at Ouray's camp, arrived in town with two other original party members. He encountered Packer in Dolan's Saloon. Nutter asked Packer where the rest of his party was, with Packer claiming that he had "got his feet wet and frozen". He stated that they had set up camp when a winter storm set in, and he started a fire to warm up while the others went ahead to look for food. Packer claimed that Swan left him with his rifle in case of trouble and that they never returned. Presuming they had abandoned him, he had left and made his way through the mountains, feeding mainly on rosebuds and small animals. Considering that Packer looked rather well-fed, and that it would be a fatal choice for five miners unfamiliar with Colorado to abandon their so-called guide in the middle of snowbound mountains, Nutter found Packer's story odd. It also was peculiar that Israel Swan would give Packer his rifle, leaving a group of four persons with only one rifle as hunting means. Additionally, he noted that Packer had in his possession a skinning knife that had belonged to Frank Miller. When Nutter asked, Packer claimed that Miller had stuck it in a tree and walked off without it. Doubtful about Packer's story, convinced that something wrong had happened, Nutter started to fight with Packer. Nutter later stated, regarding Packer, "He was sulky, obstinate and quarrelsome. He was a petty thief willing to take things that did not belong to him, whether of any value or not." The two men were separated, and Packer kept on preparing his departure from Saguache.

=== Arrival of Loutsenhizer ===
Meanwhile, two men of the five-man party that had taken the Gunnison River route finally arrived at the Los Pinós Indian Agency. They were joined a few days later by the remaining three men, including Loutsenhizer. The men were introduced to the head of the agency, General Charles Adams, who told them he had already met another member of their party by the name of Alfred Packer – and that he spoke of desertion at the hands of his companions. All five men at once discredited what Packer had told the General and his staff, stating the men they had known would never abandon a man to die. Loutsenhizer told the General that Packer was not to be trusted, and expressed suspicion about Packer's stories. He noted the Winchester rifle carried in by Packer belonged to an elderly man in Packer's party and that a pipe he had left behind at the agency belonged to a man named Shannon Bell, who was also a member of his party. The men convinced General Adams to dispatch a mounted agency officer to Saguache at once to retrieve Packer for questioning, but under the guise of recruiting him for a search party for the missing men. Packer was in the process of getting his things gathered to leave the area when he was again approached by Nutter and some other men. The agency officer arrived just in time and got between the men. He told Packer he had been sent to enlist him as a guide for the search party for the missing men. Packer was reluctant to go, but with little other option than vigilante justice, he agreed. He mounted his recently purchased horse and followed the officer back to Los Pinós.

=== Different truths ===
Upon arriving at the agency, Packer met General Adams, and five men he had not seen since February. The agency officer came in after Packer and relayed to General Adams that a man named Preston Nutter had told him Packer had spent several hundred dollars over his six-week stay in Saguache as well as buying a new horse and saddle, that he was in possession of things that belonged to missing men, and that he was penniless when he had originally joined their party. Loutsenhizer demanded an explanation from Packer, who repeated the story exactly as he had told it the first time. Packer showed amazement that the men had not been heard from, and was concerned for their well-being. When Loutsenhizer asked where his newly acquired wealth came from, Packer stated that he had received a cash loan from a man in Saguache. Adams told Packer that he would send an officer to Saguache to verify his story. The officer returned soon with news from various sources that Packer had been seen with several different wallets and had told varying stories regarding his journey, and that he had arrived in Saguache with plenty of cash, and that no one in town claimed to have lent him a penny. Adams convened a council of the five members: himself, Packer, and the agency officers. As they were beginning to settle the matter, two Ute tribesmen arrived in Los Piños, holding strips of dried human flesh which they had found on a hill near the agency while hunting. Packer then begged for mercy, swearing to make a full confession, saying to Adams: "It would not be the first time that people had been obliged to eat each other when they were hungry." This sentence opened what was to become one of several different official statements over the next three decades.

Herman Lauter, the agency clerk, was in attendance and transcribed Packer's first official statement. Packer claimed that the men had left Ouray's camp with what they thought was sufficient food for the anticipated 14-day journey ahead of them. Sooner than expected, he said, provisions were exhausted. They survived for days on roots dug from the ground, pine gum, rose buds, and the occasional rabbit. After a few days of no wildlife activity due to the extreme cold and eating virtually nothing but roots, he claimed that the men started to eye each other in an unsettling way. A few days after this, he left camp to gather dry firewood and returned to find four men around the slain body of Israel Swan, who had been struck in the head with a hatchet and killed instantly. The four started to butcher Swan, with Packer accepting the situation and joining them. He claimed several thousand dollars was found on Swan's person and divided between the men. They consumed the most agreeable parts of Swan's body, packed some up, and moved on, with Packer appropriating Swan's rifle. Within two days, however, the five men were again out of meat, and game continued to elude them. Packer, Bell, Humphrey, and Noon decided in secret that Miller would be the next to go. Packer confessed that Miller was a stocky man, and was chosen for his amount of soft flesh. He was killed with a hatchet blow to the head, while he was stooping to pick up wood for the fire, then butchered and consumed. Packer took Miller's knife, and Miller's share of Swan's money was redistributed among the four men, who then moved on to Los Pinós.

The winter was relentless and the men were slow-moving, barely able to see in front of them, cursing the wind that was cutting at their exposed skin. Humphrey was next to be sacrificed, followed before too long by George Noon. At last it was just down to Bell and Packer. He claimed that the two men swore not to eat each other. They each had a rifle at this point and a couple of thousand dollars of Swan's cash, and presumed that two men would fare well on the remainder of their trip with what minimal game there was to be found. They agreed they would say the four men had perished from the elements and were buried with dignity, vowing never to speak of the cannibalism. They felt no one would ever believe it was as "necessary" as they had. After trekking for a few days, with little else eaten other than a rabbit and some roots, the men were exhausted and set up camp next to a large lake that was skirted on one side by a large grove of hemlock trees. Packer said a few days after this, Bell snapped up out of his blanket and screamed that he could not take it anymore. He told Packer that one of them was going to die for food. He snatched his rifle and sprinted at Packer with it readied to bash his skull in. Packer deflected the blow and struck Bell in the head with the hatchet. He claimed that at this point the only fear he had left was to starve to death. He then butchered Bell, eating as much as he could in preparation for the remaining leg of his journey, and packed a good amount away. He relieved Bell of his share of Swan's money and then headed on, unsure how far he was from anywhere or whether he was even going to survive. After a while he mounted a hill and saw at long last the Los Pinós Indian Agency. He threw the remaining strips of Bell's flesh away, presuming that an animal would hastily eat them, and admitted that he did so with a fair degree of hesitation.

General Adams called for a conference among the five men and the agency officers to determine the next course of action. It was decided that a search party would be assembled at once to find the men's remains. The five original party members claimed that they did not believe one single part of Packer's story. General Adams asked of the two Ute men if they knew of an area next to a lake that Packer had described. They said such a place existed roughly 50 miles away, across the hills. The search party was headed by agency clerk Herman Lauter and consisted of the five miners from Utah, a few agency officers, and Packer acting as guide. After two weeks, as the party was reaching the area of the Lake Fork of the Gunnison River, Packer claimed he was lost and that he did not recognize the surroundings. Nothing was found, and the party headed back to the agency. Along their route back, Packer attempted to murder Herman Lauter with a knife. He was caught in the act, restrained, and arrested. General Adams had been willing to believe Packer up to this point, but the unprovoked attempt made on his officer's life convinced him that Packer was dangerous. He was transported to Saguache and jailed by the sheriff outside the town itself for his own protection.

=== First confession ===
During Packer's detention, he retracted what he had told the men at the agency about the events leading up to the five men losing their lives. He now claimed that the men had encountered a strong blizzard along their way through the mountains. The snow fell so heavily and persistently that they became hopelessly lost, and were unable to retrace their steps back to their starting point. Provisions were already minimal when they began the trek, and quickly ran out. They just as quickly ran out of matches, and were forced to carry hot embers in a steel coffee pot to have a means to light fires. Days went by with no signs of game, and attempts at ice fishing proved utterly futile. After roasting and eating their shoes and attempting to survive on what scant and edible vegetation they could find, the men, claimed Packer, entered into a pact whereby if one died, his meat would serve to save the others from starvation. After days of hiking with virtually nothing to eat, Israel Swan could go no further, and the others were dangerously fatigued. They found a pine-shaded gulch next to a lake, and set up camp. A short time after this, Swan died of a combination of hunger and exposure, according to Packer.

Packer signed his first confession:

Old Man Swan died first and was eaten by the other five persons about ten days out of camp. Four or five days afterwards Humphreys died and was also eaten; he had about one hundred and thirty three dollars ($133). I found the pocket book and took the money. Some time afterwards, while I was carrying wood, the butcher was killed—as the other two told me accidentally—and he was also eaten. Bell shot "California" with Swan's gun and I killed Bell. Shot him. I covered up the remains and took a large piece along. Then traveled fourteen days into the agency. Bell wanted to kill me with his rifle—struck a tree and broke his gun.

In Packer's later amended version of this story, the men had endured almost 20 days from Ouray's camp and more than 10 without any substantial food at all. Packer elaborated that James Humphrey had also died of exposure to the extreme cold, and that George Noon was killed days later by Shannon Bell for the sole purpose of food, after there was no more substantial meat to be had from the three fallen men. Then it was just down to Bell and himself. He claimed that he and Bell had agreed that they would stand together until the end, swearing not to eat each other. Days went by, and Bell could no longer take the hunger and rushed at Packer with his rifle, intending to bludgeon him with its stock. Packer then shot Bell with his pistol. Packer confessed to taking the valuables of the deceased members, claiming they no longer needed them, but made no statements as to the exact items taken nor to the amount of money accrued. While he was in jail, observers challenged his credibility and noted that Packer, far from being a victim of cold or starvation, had probably set a trap and led his group in the middle of the hills to kill and rob them.

=== Discovery of the bodies ===
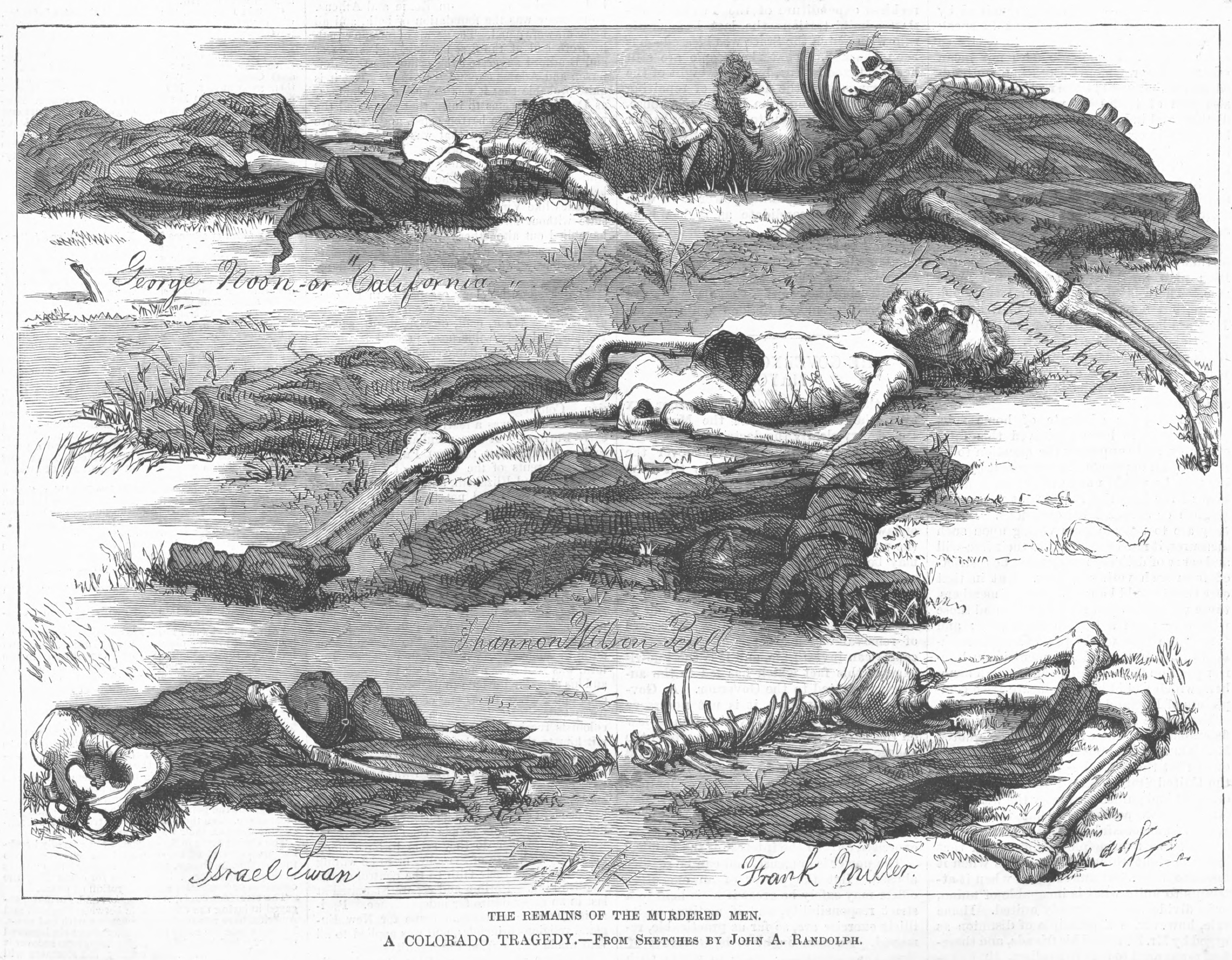
Harper's illustration (cropped). Top row left to right: George "California" Noon; James Humphreys; Middle row: Shannon Wilson Bell; Lower left: Israel Swan; Lower right: Frank Miller.

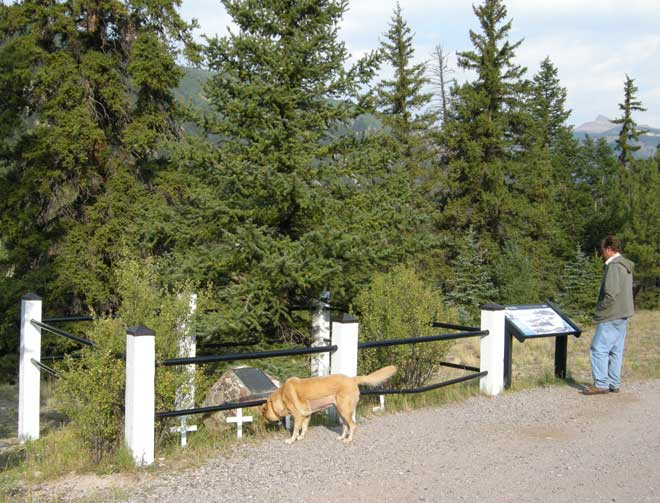
Memorial to Packer's victims, at the scene of the crime, southeast of Lake City, Colorado

The following August, the site of the incident was found by John A. Randolph, an illustrator who worked for Harper's Weekly magazine. He discovered all five of the bodies at the foot of Slumgullion Pass, two miles southeast of Lake City, Colorado, in a pine-shaded gulch. They lay above the Lake Fork of the Gunnison River, now known colloquially as Dead Man's Gulch, which matched the description of where Packer had originally claimed that only Bell was killed. The snow that had been covering the bodies and campsite had melted in the intervening four months. Randolph sketched the scene as he found it, and then alerted authorities in nearby Lake City. The story was covered two months later in the October 17, 1874, edition of Harper's Weekly, and included his illustration of the site.

The local coroner and law enforcement set out for the site along with about 20 volunteers and discovered the bodies of all five men in various states of decomposition, having been left to the elements and animals for four months. First responders to the site noted that it appeared that "extreme violence" had befallen the men. Frank Miller's head was missing entirely from the campsite; his and Israel Swan's corpses had been considerably worked upon by scavengers and were little more than scattered bones. Israel's skull had a jagged chunk missing out of it. The bodies of George Noon and James Humphrey were largely flayed torsos of rotting viscera, attached to skeletal legs, but with intact and bearded faces, with Humphrey's face being slightly more decayed than Noon's. They had received blows to the head, the shape indicating perhaps a hatchet, and their bodies had noticeable broken bones. Shannon Bell lay with largely skeletal legs splayed and arms to his sides that were crudely cut to their bones leading to hands that were still fully skinned. His remaining corpse was a mass of viscera encased in an almost wholly flayed torso. His face was still wearing a thick red beard and bushy hair. The lack of noticeable decay in his face suggested that he had been the last to die. The top of Bell's skull had been ripped open. The three men whose bodies were still intact, or partly intact, had flesh and muscle excised from choice and meaty locations; no attempt had been made to consume bone marrow or any organs at all.

The state of the bodies contradicted Packer's version of events. They were all together in one spot, not scattered across miles. Both Humphrey and Noon had large portions of remaining flesh, muscle and organs, that could have been consumed long before Bell attempted to murder Packer, as he had claimed. The men had tattered cloths lashed to their rotting feet, which had replaced the shoes they had probably eaten, and moldy and tattered blankets lay beneath and beside them. A beaten path went from the resting place of the corpses to a crude shelter that was used by Packer. Moreover, there was evidence to suggest that the deaths had occurred before supplies were totally exhausted. Within the shelter were possessions of the men which Packer had left behind. The theory at the time was that Packer killed the men before supplies ran out to rob them of their possessions, got snowed in, and then lived in his makeshift shelter for months, walking to his slain companions and slicing meat off as needed. Preston Nutter accompanied the party to the site, and identified the bodies as belonging to the five missing men. A rifle broken in two was found close to the bodies. Owing to the damage apparent on their remains, it is presumed that it was used to bludgeon one or more of them. Their remains were buried at the site by officials, and the search party returned to Packer's makeshift jail to confront him, only to find him missing.

The jail he had been kept in was little more than a log cabin located on ranch property belonging to the Saguache County Sheriff. Months had passed with no definitive evidence of a crime having been committed, no bodies discovered, and no formal charges lodged against Packer — other than the attempt on Lauter's life, which was not tenaciously sought for prosecution and was used more as a means to keep him under custody. Saguache County authorities were reportedly not happy about taxpayer dollars being spent so exorbitantly on keeping Packer housed and under constant guard. He was allegedly passed a makeshift key for his irons and given some supplies, and easily escaped. Even so, nearly the entirety of Saguache was convinced, either through rumor or rational deduction, that Packer was guilty of either robbery or murder. His life was threatened constantly by the nearby townspeople. Packer never divulged who helped him escape, how this was achieved, or why. It was presumed that his guard had been bribed by Packer himself or by someone else.

=== Theories ===
The generally accepted theory at the time was that Packer had attached himself to the party under highly overstated qualifications of being a mountain guide familiar with the area in order to accompany the men to Breckenridge, and had at best led his party to miserable deaths due to gross incompetence. This was enough of a crime in itself as far as the local population was concerned. However, an ultimately more popular theory was that he had set out with his party of five men from Ouray's camp, with a premeditated plan to lead them into the wilderness where he would kill and rob them. Nutter and Loutsenhizer made it a personal mission to discredit Packer's alleged qualifications for being a guide — let alone a mountain guide — and pointed out all of his character flaws that they had come to know, stressing his numerous different stories and inconsistencies. Local papers picked up the story and the incident received constant coverage, with highly sensational headlines, many negative comments regarding Packer's character, and highly imagined theories that grabbed both national and international attention. Regardless as to how it may have happened, nearly the entire population of Saguache — and soon nearly the entire country and beyond — found that Packer's culpability for his party's deaths was beyond doubt.

The cannibalism aspect of his charges, although shocking, was not necessarily the foremost issue of his guilt. People at that time were well-acquainted with the story of the ill-fated Donner Party, who had resorted to cannibalism during the winter of 1846–1847, and were understanding to a degree of the dire need to eat in the unforgiving wilderness. Additionally cannibalism was and is not illegal per se in the United States, unless one commits murder in order to obtain the flesh to be consumed. Even in such a case, the accused would be charged with murder, with the cannibalism itself being charged as the desecration and/or abuse of a corpse. Packer would claim for the remainder of his life that he had been unjustly vilified and convicted for engaging in cannibalism rather than for cold-blooded murder, which he continued to deny ever having committed. In the end, it came down to the question: did the five men die due to incompetence, or greed?

== First trial ==
On March 11, 1883, Packer was discovered by Jean "Frenchy" Cabazon in Cheyenne, Wyoming, living under the alias of "John Schwartze", one of the original members of the Utah mining party who stayed in Chief Ouray's camp in the winter of 1874. Cabazon was himself a member of the original party of men who left Provo, and wisely decided to stay put in Chief Ouray's camp, later safely making his way to their destination with Bob McGrue and Preston Nutter's party.

He encountered Packer by chance when Packer approached him looking to buy some supplies. Cabazon reported Packer to the local sheriff, who apprehended him and contacted General Adams. He was summoned to Cheyenne where he confirmed Packer's identity and accompanied him by train to Denver for his second confession, which Packer signed on March 16. Packer stated that his main reason for fleeing was out of a fear of mob justice being exacted upon him by the populace of Saguache. Because the actual crime was committed within the confines of Hinsdale County, rather than neighboring Saguache County, Packer was accordingly sent to Lake City for detention and prosecution.

Instead of claiming that the men were gradually eaten as they died until Bell killed Noon and Packer in turn killed Bell in self-defense, Packer now claimed that Bell had killed the others after Bell had told him to go scouting for any way out of the mountains and to find some food. He had been gone the better part of the day and returned in the late evening. Packer told General Adams:

"I found the red headed man [Bell] who acted crazy in the morning sitting near the fire roasting a piece of meat which he had cut out of the leg of the German butcher [Miller], the latter's body was lying the furthest off from the fire down the stream, his skull was crushed in with the hatchet. The other three were lying near the fire, they were cut in the forehead with the hatchet. Some had two or three cuts. I came within a rod of the fire, when the man saw me, he got up with his hatchet towards me when I shot him sideways through the belly, he fell on his face, the hatchet fell forwards. I grabbed it and hit him in the top of the head."

In the ensuing moments of shooting Bell and going for the hatchet, Packer dropped his revolver in the deep snow and subsequently lost it. He claimed he made himself a crude shelter out of stray logs to combat the snow and wind, aways down from the bodies. Another strong storm set in and he hunkered down for hours. He was starving and made the decision that he had to eat something or die. He continued:

"I went back to the fire. Covered the men up and fetched to the camp the piece of meat that was near the fire. I made a new fire near my camp and cooked the piece of meat and ate it. I tried to get away every day but could not, so I lived off the flesh of these men, the bigger part of sixty days."

Adams asked Packer why he had not told him this story nine years previous, with Packer replying: "I was excited, I wanted to say something, and the story, as I told it, came first to my mind!"

At the time of Packer's trial, it was reported by the family of Israel Swan that he had left to go on the expedition with around $6,000 (equivalent to $170,735 in 2025) in cash and gold, and that he also had a valuable Winchester rifle with him, which would give a strong motivation for murder, as well as his senior age of 65 at the time of his death. The other four members may have been either complicit in his murder and later betrayed by Packer, or were murdered by him for having been witnesses. Packer was not found with any gold on him at the time of his arrest, and although he did have money left, it did not total in the thousands. His spending had been frivolous.

Nevertheless, on April 6, a trial began in Lake City. It was the argument of the prosecution that the only logical reason for Packer to have attempted such a perilous journey through the mountains with such minimal food and supplies was for the sole purpose to lead the men into the wilderness to both kill and rob them. Packer pleaded not guilty. After seven days of testimonies and examinations, he was found guilty of the premeditated murder of Israel Swan, and sentenced to death by hanging, which was scheduled for May 19, 1883. It was presumed that Swan's death had occurred on, or around, March 1. It was determined by the prosecution in court that Swan's remains showed signs of a struggle at the time of death, and that the others appeared to be killed in their sleep. Among those who testified on behalf of the prosecution were Otto Mears, Larry Dolan, Oliver D. Loutsenhizer, and Preston Nutter, who acted as the prosecution's key witness. According to a local newspaper, which received their quote from Larry Dolan, the presiding judge, M.B. Gerry, said:

Stand up yah voracious man-eatin' sonofabitch and receive yir sintince. When yah came to Hinsdale County, there was siven Dimmycrats. But you, yah et five of 'em, goddam yah. I sintince yah t' be hanged by th' neck ontil yer dead, dead, dead, as a warnin' ag'in reducin' th' Dimmycratic populayshun of this county. Packer, you Republican cannibal, I would sintince ya ta hell but the statutes forbid it.

Court records present Judge Gerry's sentence as conventionally apolitical:

Alfred Packer, the judgement of this court is that you be removed from hence to the jail of Hinsdale County and there confined until the 19th day of May, A.D. 1883, and that on said 19th day of May, 1883, you be taken from thence by the sheriff of Hinsdale County to a place of execution prepared for this purpose, at some point within the corporate limits of the town of Lake City, in the said county of Hinsdale, and between the hours of 10 A.M. and 3 P.M. of said day, you, then and there, by said sheriff, be hung by the neck until you are dead, dead, dead, and may God have mercy upon your soul.

== Second trial ==
Packer was spared the death penalty when his lawyers discovered that the murder statutes on the books for 1874 had been repealed and replaced with a "savings clause", which spared him being tried for murder on a technicality. In October 1885, the sentence was reversed by the Colorado Supreme Court being based on an ex post facto law. They had declared that the government could not sentence a man to death for committing a crime, if it had indeed occurred, before Colorado officially became a state as opposed to a territory.

The overturning of his murder charge and scheduled execution did not spare Packer culpability for the men's deaths, however. A second trial was held in Gunnison following a change of venue for his hearing that was also granted per the Colorado Supreme Court as well as having a new Judge of Republican Party standing to preside, pursuant to Packer and his Counsel feeling as though the prejudices and pre-affirmed guilt within the community of Lake City (most of them Democrats), made it impossible for him to receive a fair and unbiased trial. He again pleaded not guilty. After a swift trial and even speedier verdict deliberation, on June 8, 1886, Packer was convicted of five counts of voluntary manslaughter and sentenced to 40 years in prison (8 years for each count, which was the maximum sentence allowed per count). At the time, this was the longest custodial sentence in U.S. history.

At the time of his second hearing, local hunters and officials made statements that although the winter of 1874 was one of the worst they had encountered for quite some time, the area of the San Juans where Packer and his party were camped was still plenty active with such large wild game as deer and antelope, as well as smaller game. There was even a report that the carcass of a deer was found near the campsite. This significantly damaged Packer's claims that the area was so scant with wildlife that the men had to resort to cannibalism quickly. Further emphasis was placed on the fact that Packer's choice to hike through the San Juan Mountains during the middle of winter, where snow depths can exceed more than six feet in a single downfall, coupled with blistering winds and freezing temperatures, was practically suicidal. He had been given a safe route to follow by locals that was next to a main water source that could have yielded fresh fish if nothing else as well as serve to keep them on course, but he perilously chose a mountain path with minimal supplies in the naive belief that it would be a faster route. In actuality, the route Packer and his companions took was nearly identical in length to the recommended route (though not in traverse), yet far more dangerous.

Packer took the stand in his own defense. His version of the events that took place at the campsite remained relatively the same as his second official version. He made a request that he be charged the 40 years, but only for the death of Shannon Bell, who is the only man that Packer continued to claim he had killed, with the other deaths being beyond his control. His request was denied. He was sent to serve out his sentence at the Canon City Penitentiary.

== Parole ==
Packer filed appeals on his case on five occasions and was roundly denied upon every submission. He sent letters to local newspapers stating he had been unjustly convicted by an unfair and unsympathetic judicial system, and by the ignorant conclusions and judgments of small-minded people. On June 19, 1899, Packer's sentence was officially upheld by the Colorado Supreme Court. Nevertheless, he was paroled on February 8, 1901, following a campaign that was initially spearheaded by an old acquaintance of Packer's named Duane Hatch, who petitioned for his release for nearly a decade before his labors came to the attention of Polly Pry. Packer had served 18 years of his 40-year sentence.

An entrepreneurial and resourceful reporter for The Denver Post, Pry saw and appreciated the sensationalism of Packer's case and how his story and pre-existing reputation could generate a buzz. She used Packer's service in the Army as a basis to portray him as a common man of the people who got caught in a regrettable situation, a victim of circumstances who did what he had to do to survive, and a man who had essentially been crucified for violating civilized sensibilities by having to resort to cannibalism. Her stories on Packer led to a change of heart within the local businesses and people such that a series of petitions and requests made their way to the office of Colorado Governor Charles Thomas, which were still met with strong opposition. Thomas ultimately relented, and his last official act before leaving office was to parole, but not pardon, Packer under the agreement that he would not try to profit from his story.

After his parole, Packer went to work as a guard at The Denver Post, and later as a ranch hand. His employment at The Denver Post came about, many believe, as a direct result of Pry and her employers securing his release. Packer had an endearing respect for Pry for his remaining years, and referred to her as his "Liberator".

== Death ==
Alfred Packer died on April 23, 1907, aged 65, in or near Phillipsburg, Colorado in Jefferson County, Colorado.

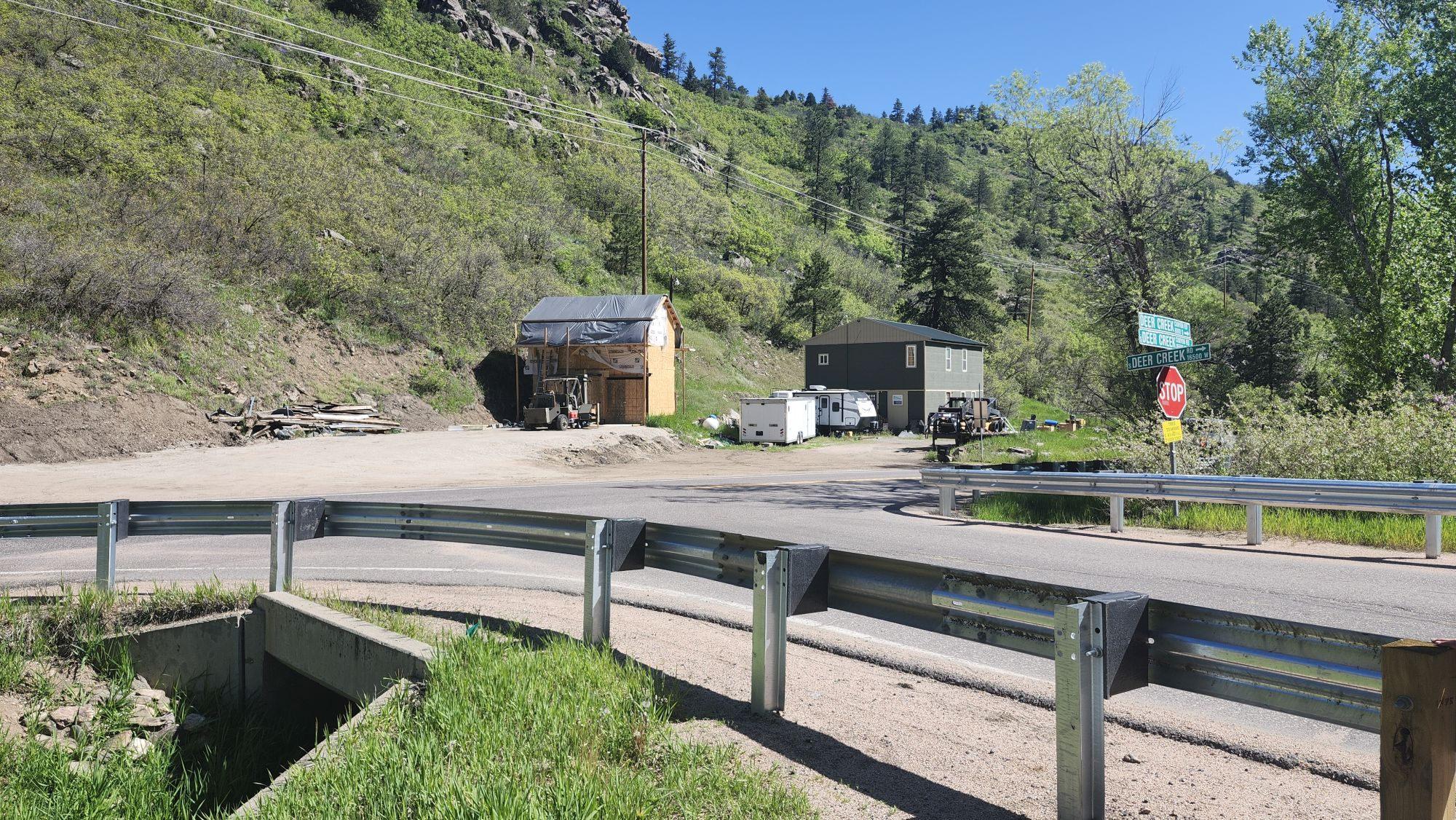
2025 image of the Phllipsburg, Colorado ghost town

The cause of his death was cited as "Dementia – trouble & worry", although his clinical cause of death has been described as the result of a stroke. Packer is today widely rumored to have become a vegetarian before his death and was reported by those who knew him as a man rich with stories and well-liked by children. He lived modestly and was reported to be a charitable man.

=== Remains ===
Packer was interred in Littleton, Colorado. His grave is marked with a veteran's tombstone listing his original regiment in 1862, which is a replacement, as his original grave marker was stolen. His first name is listed as Alfred; he is known to have gone by both "Alfred" and "Alferd" in life. He was never successful in getting an official state pardon for his crimes.

The Littleton Cemetery Association cemented over Packer's grave in 1973 to deter grave robbing and vandalism. Despite their belief that his corpse is intact, claims have been made by Edward Meyer, the Vice-President of Exhibits and Archives for the Ripley's Believe It or Not! Museum, that they are in possession of Packer's dissected skull, which they bought from an anonymous party for a reported sum of $20,000. No statement was made as to how they verified the authenticity of the skull, which is partially mummified, other than to state that the seller's information regarding its origin was sufficient.

If the skull in question does belong to Packer, it is presumed that his head was removed from his body shortly before or after his burial, was then dissected with the brain being removed for study, and was then preserved through an arsenic curing process. It is then said to have fallen into the hands of a traveling sideshow, which displayed it, until it was later sold to a private party who in turn later sold it to Ripley's. As of 2008, the skull is reported to be at the Ripley's Museum in San Antonio, Texas, following its relocation from their New Orleans facility in the wake of Hurricane Katrina.

== Later investigations ==
On July 17, 1989, 115 years after Packer consumed his companions, an exhumation of the five bodies was undertaken by James E. Starrs, then a professor of law specializing in forensic science at George Washington University, following an exhaustive search for the precise location of the remains near the Lake Fork river upstream from Lake City. The men's remains were located at the end of a residential driveway of a home belonging to a local surgeon, and were buried only 13 inches below ground level. Starrs and his colleague Walter H. Birkby concluded, regarding the cannibalism: "I don't think there will ever be any way to scientifically demonstrate cannibalism. Cannibalism per se is the ingestion of human flesh. So you'd have to have a picture of the guy actually eating." Packer never denied cannibalism, so this was not the main intent of the investigation. The evidence uncovered was sufficient for Starrs to conclude that Packer had indeed murdered his comrades. Starrs came away with the belief that Packer more than likely murdered his companions for their belongings, and resorted to cannibalism out of necessity rather than intent. The men were re-interred and given a proper burial, complete with funeral rites being read.

Exhumation of the skeletal remains showed signs of what appeared to be blunt force trauma to the skulls of two of the men, with no other noteworthy disturbance to their skeletal remains aside from those made during their butchering. All skulls had damage to varying extents to their upper craniums, with fabric fibers being found within some of the skulls themselves, suggesting that their heads were possibly covered with a blanket at the time of their deaths. The three other skeletons showed defensive signs of hacking marks across the radial and ulna bones of their forearms (Shannon Bell being one), which one could sustain whilst shielding his face and body from an attack. Although Packer claimed that Bell had murdered the others with hatchet blows to the head, in his second version of the story, he never claimed that he had to fight off Bell with the hatchet in any rendition. In one version of his story, Bell had charged at Packer with Swan's rifle, and Packer shot him. In Packer's second official version of the story, he claimed he finished off Bell with a hatchet blow to the head, but that was the extent of his claim in regards to the hatchet. All five of the skeletons had numerous differing post-mortem injuries to them, including depressed fractures, butterfly fractures, butchering trauma, and hacking trauma, which seems to contradict Packer's claims of "minimal cannibalism".

Two skeletons aside from that of Shannon Bell were found to have cylindrical puncture wounds in the pelvic bone, which has led some to question if all three marks are the result of the scavenging marks of a bear, or even possibly bullet wounds. No definitive conclusions have been made to these discoveries.

This discovery suggested a scenario in which two of the men were bludgeoned in their sleep by Packer, the three remaining men awoke, and Packer shot them in the hips to incapacitate them (if the punctures are in fact bullet wounds). They then attempted to fight off Packer who was wielding a hatchet and he killed them all with blows to the head. He then butchered the men and used their flesh to survive in his snowbound state and during his journey. The differing states of decomposition of the bodies does contradict this theory, though it is plausible. It would seem unlikely that Packer had shot three of the five men in the hip, which is not by itself an outright kill shot, unless it was to debilitate them while he went in for the kill. Further analysis into the entry and exit geometry could be telling as to what their initial cause was, but no such examination has been done to date. His ultimate motivation for their murder has been debated heavily, and has several possible theories.

In 1994, David P. Bailey, Curator of History at the Museum of Western Colorado, undertook an investigation to turn up more conclusive results than Starrs' with respect to Packer's claims of having shot Bell. In the Audrey Thrailkill collection of firearms owned by the museum was a Colt revolver that had reportedly been found at the site of Packer's alleged crime. Exhaustive investigation into the pistol's background turned up documents from the time of the trial: "A Civil War veteran that visited the crime scene stated that Shannon Bell had been shot twice and the other victims were killed with a hatchet. Upon careful study of Bell, he noticed a severe bullet wound to the pelvic area and that Bell's wallet had a bullet hole through it." This seems to corroborate Packer's claim that Bell had killed the other victims and that Packer shot Bell in self-defense. By 2000, Bailey had not yet proven a link between the antique pistol and Alfred Packer, but he discovered that forensic samples from the 1989 exhumation had been archived, and analysis in 2001 with an electron microscope by Dr. Richard Dujay at Mesa State College found microscopic lead fragments in the soil taken from under Shannon Bell's remains that were matched by spectrograph with the bullets remaining in what was indeed Packer's pistol. While it appears certain that at least Bell was shot, the question of whether it was in self-defense remains unanswered.

== In popular culture ==
=== Books ===
In Dashiell Hammett's hardboiled detective novel The Thin Man, Nick Charles advises Gilbert Wynant to read a selection about Packer's expeditions. The selection, from Thomas Samuel Duke's Celebrated Criminal Cases of America, gives Packer's first name as "Alfred".

Packer is also the subject of Man-Eater, by American true-crime writer Harold Schechter.

=== Eateries and menus ===
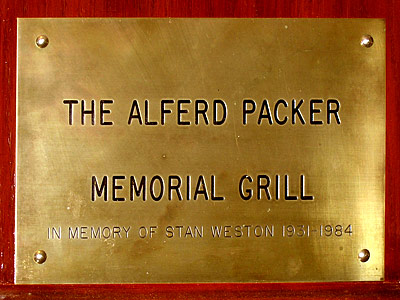
The Alfred Packer Memorial Grill

In 1968, students at the University of Colorado Boulder named their new cafeteria grill the "Alferd G. Packer Memorial Grill", with the slogan, "Have a friend for lunch!" Students can order an "El Canibal" beefburger, and on the wall is a giant map outlining Packer's travels through Colorado. It has since been renamed the Alferd Packer Restaurant & Grill.

In 1977, the U.S. Secretary of Agriculture, Bob Bergland, attempted to terminate a contract for the department's cafeteria food service but was prevented by the General Services Administration (GSA). To embarrass the GSA, Bergland and his employees convened a press conference on August 10, 1977, to unveil a plaque naming the executive cafeteria "The Alferd Packer Memorial Grill", announcing that Packer's life exemplified the spirit and fare of the cafeteria and would "serve all mankind". The event was covered on the ABC Evening News by Barbara Walters. The stratagem succeeded, and the contracts were terminated soon thereafter. Magnanimous in victory, Bergland yielded to the bureaucratic objection that the plaque lacked official GSA authorization and removed it. The plaque is currently displayed on the wall of the National Press Club's The Reliable Source members-only bar. It doubles as a memorial to Stanley Weston (1931–84), a man who worked at the USDA. The Press Club's hamburger is called the "Alferd Packer Burger".

=== Movies and music ===
A biopic of Packer, The Legend of Alfred Packer, was released in 1980. In 1993, the comedy musical about Packer, Cannibal! The Musical, was released exclusively to Boulder, Colorado, and was released in the rest of the United States in 1996. It is also Trey Parker's directoral debut.

Folk singer Phil Ochs wrote the song "The Ballad of Alferd Packer" (1964), documenting the events of the expedition and its aftermath. Ochs' use of humor in the song is typical of the seemingly lighthearted ongoing attitude toward Packer and his alleged crimes. Although the track never appeared on any of Ochs' studio or live album releases, it has appeared on several compilations issued since his death in 1976, most recently on the On My Way (2010) compilation of demos from 1963.

C. W. McCall wrote the song "Comin' Back for More" about Packer.

== See also ==
- W. W. Anderson, Packer's attorney
- Donner Party
- Alexander Pearce, an Irish-born convict who confessed to cannibalizing fellow prison escapees in the Tasmanian wilderness
- List of incidents of cannibalism

== Bibliography ==
- Botkin, Benjamin A. (1957). "Man-Eating Packer". A Treasury of American Anecdotes. Galahad Press. p. 174.
- Gantt, Paul H. (1952). The Case of Alfred Packer, The Man-Eater. Denver: University of Denver Press.
- Kushner, Ervan F. (1980). Alferd G. Packer, Cannibal! Victim?. Frederick, Co.: Platte 'N Press.
- Ramsland, Katherine (2005). Alfred Packer: The Maneater of Colorado.
- Schechter, Harold (2015). Man-Eater: The Life and Legend of an American Cannibal. New York: Little A. ISBN 978-1477829561.
- Starrs, James E. and Katherine Ramsland (2005). A Voice for the Dead. New York: G. P Putnam and Sons. pp. 13–36.
