= Dian Bachar =

American actor (born 1970)

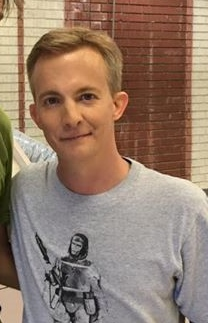
- Bachar in 2015
- Born: October 26, 1970 (age 55)
- Occupation: Actor
- Years active: 1990–present

Dian Bachar (born October 26, 1970) is an American actor most notable for his roles in various films by or starring his friends Trey Parker and Matt Stone, such as Cannibal! The Musical (George Noon), Orgazmo (Ben Chapleski) and his most famous role as Kenny "Squeak" Scolari in 1998's BASEketball, as well as making the occasional appearance on South Park.

== Career ==
In 1998, Bachar won a Leonardo da Vinci Award from the Beaux Arts Society, Inc. in the category of Actor, Debut Performance (Film) for his role in BASEketball and an award for Best Actor in the 2012 short film Coaching Me Softly at the 48-Hour Film Project.

Due to his friendship with creators Parker and Stone, Bachar had provided several guest voices on their animated series South Park.

- "Cow Days" – the game show announcer
- "Merry Christmas Charlie Manson!" – the fake Mr. Hankey
- "Do the Handicapped Go to Hell?" – Satan's lover Chris
- "Probably" – Satan's lover Chris

Bachar and fellow actor Sam Macaroni are the leads in the internet series Roommates: The Series and Dimwits.

== Filmography ==
Year	Title	Role	Notes
1993	Cannibal! The Musical	George Noon	
1995	Time Warped	Peeny Bunsinger / Jeffy / Homo Errectus	TV series
1997	Orgazmo	Ben "Choda Boy" Chapleski	
1998	BASEketball	Kenny "Squeak" Scolari	
1998–2000	South Park	Chris/Fake Mr. Hankey/Announcer (voice)	4 episodes
1999	Galaxy Quest	Nervous Tech	
1999	Captain Jackson	Eggbert Stevens	
2000	The Adventures of Rocky and Bullwinkle	RBTV Studio Technician	
2000	The Man Show	Tiny Guy on the Beach	
2000–2001	Two Guys, a Girl, and a Pizza Place	Roger	4 episodes
2004	The Wager	Sean Johnson	
2005	No Rules	Grady	
2006	TV: The Movie	Various roles	
2006	Electric Apricot	Skip Holmes	
2007	Gangsta Rap: The Glockumentary	Limo Driver	
2009	The Life of Lucky Cucumber	"Lucky" Cucumber Cavanaugh	
2012	Retreat!	Private McBain	
2012	Coaching Me Softly	David Stott	short
2012	The Man in the Silo	David	
2012	Spectrum Hunter	Store Clerk	
2013	White T	Andy	
2013	There's Something About Carrie	Uncle Randi	short
2014	The Murders of Brandywine Theater	Henry Kosta	
2015	Homestead	Magee	short film
2015	Santiago	Dusty Wilhelm	
2015	Mitch and Tanner Save America	Mitch (voice)	video short
2015	My Neighborhood	Dian Donovan	
2015	Tales of the Wicked Unseen	Will Grimm	
2016	The Bet	Angry Video Store Customer	
2021	Nightmare Alley	Fee Fee the Birdgirl	
