= Cannibal! The Musical =

1993 film

- 13th-anniversary DVD cover
- Directed by: Trey Parker
- Written by: Trey Parker
- Based on: A True Story
- Produced by: Ian Hardin; Alexandra Kelly; Jason McHugh; Trey Parker; Matt Stone
- Starring: Trey Parker; Ian Hardin; Matt Stone; Jon Hegel; Jason McHugh; Dian Bachar; Toddy Walters; Robert Muratore; Andrew Kemler; Edward Henwood; Stan Brakhage
- Cinematography: Robert Muratore; Chris Graves
- Edited by: Ian Hardin
- Music by: Trey Parker; Rich Sanders
- Production companies: Avenging Conscience; Cannibal Films, Ltd.
- Distributed by: Troma Entertainment
- Release dates: October 31, 1993 (Boulder, Colorado); August 30, 1996
- Running time: 96 minutes
- Country: United States
- Languages: English; Japanese
- Budget: $125,000

Cannibal! The Musical (originally known as Alferd Packer: The Musical) is a 1993 American musical comedy film directed, written, produced, co-scored by and starring Trey Parker in his directorial debut while studying at the University of Colorado at Boulder, before reaching fame with South Park alongside his friend Matt Stone who also stars in and produced the film. It is loosely based on the true story of Alfred "Alferd" Packer and the sordid details of the trip from Utah to Colorado that left his five fellow travelers dead and partially eaten. Trey Parker (credited as Juan Schwartz) stars as Alferd Packer, with frequent collaborators Stone, Dian Bachar, and others playing the supporting roles.

A live staged version was performed at Sierra College, in Rocklin, California, in May 1998. It was followed by Dad's Garage Theater, Atlanta Georgia, in the fall of 1998. The Dad's Garage version is highlighted in the special features of Troma's DVD release of the movie. The show has continued to find small theaters and audiences across America and beyond for many years. In 2001, a production was staged Off-Broadway at the Kraine Theater on East 4th Street in New York.

In 2011, producer Jason McHugh released a book titled Shpadoinkle: The Making of Cannibal! The Musical which chronicles all aspects of the creation and continuation of the Cannibal! The Musical cult phenomenon.

Though not a success, the film would manage to attract the attention of Pam Brady, who was at the time an assistant to then-Fox executive Brian Graden, with Parker and Stone's relationship with Brady and Graden ultimately becoming the key to the history of South Park.

== Plot ==
The film begins with a reenactment of the gruesome act of cannibalism described by the prosecuting attorney during Alferd Packer's 1883 trial. During this sensationalized account, a haggard Packer repeatedly insists that was not how it happened. During a break in the trial, Packer is enticed by journalist Polly Pry to tell his side of the story, which he proceeds to do, via flashback beginning with his horse Lianne galloping in a field.

In 1873, Packer was part of a group of miners in Bingham Canyon, Utah, who hear of new prospects in Breckenridge. Together, the small group decide to travel together into Colorado Territory. Packer is appointed as the replacement for the original guide, since he claimed knowledge of the area. He and Lianne set off on what Packer estimates will be a three-week journey with a party of five miners: Shannon Wilson Bell, James Humphrey, Frank Miller, George Noon and Israel Swan.

Four weeks later, while attempting to visit Provo for supplies they become convinced they are lost. They are given warning by a local of impending doom awaiting them in the mountains. Finally arriving in Provo, they run into a group of three fur trappers bound for Saguache; O.D. Loutzenheiser, Preston Nutter, and their diminutive leader, Jean "Frenchy" Cabazon. The trappers despise the miners, whom they contemptuously call "diggers", yet seem to like Packer's Arabian horse, telling Packer that she's a "trapper horse". The next day, Packer wakes up to discover his horse Lianne is missing. The men attempt to cross the Green River near the Utah border. Eventually, after a disastrous crossing of the Colorado River the Packer party is spotted by two "Nihonjin" Indians. They are taken back to the tribe's encampment near Delta where the chief warns them of a winter storm, allowing them to wait it out with the tribe. Packer's party also find the trappers camping out with the tribe, a small altercation breaks out over Lianne, whose feedbag Packer finds in their possession.

In the present time, Packer is sentenced to death by hanging, with his execution to occur in Lake City. That night, Polly reveals her growing affection for him through song. The next day, Polly visits Packer once again in prison, where he continues his story.

The men set out in the wilderness and begin to suspect that Packer is really only interested in following the trappers to find his horse. They soon run out of food, resorting to eating their shoes as they become lost in the snow-covered Rocky Mountains. An optimistic Swan sings about building a snowman; Bell shoots him in the head out of frustration. The men discuss their dire situation that night over the fire, speaking of the cannibalism that the Donner Party had to resort to in California. They decide to consume the body of their dead companion as Miller cuts up Swan's body, and only Bell refuses to partake in the cannibalism. After a few more days, the party loses hope, which leads to talk of sacrificing one of their own. Packer convinces them for one more chance for a scouting trip, but when he returns, Bell has killed the others, claiming they planned to kill and eat him after Packer left. Packer is forced to throw a cleaver at Bell, seemingly killing him. He is then forced to cannibalize the others to wait out the rest of the winter.

Arriving in Saguache sometime later, Packer finds Lianne, who has taken to Cabazon, upsetting Packer. The sheriff of Saguache, suspicious of Packer arriving without the rest of his party, eventually finds out the fate of the other members and attempts to arrest Packer for cannibalism at a saloon. A bar-fight between Packer and the trappers occurs, which Packer wins after brutally attacking Cabazon's groin using fighting techniques he learned from the Nihonjin chief, leaving Cabazon incapacitated. Following this, Packer attempts to flee to Wyoming, only to later be arrested there and brought back to Colorado to await judgment. However, he is saved at the last minute by Polly, who arrives on the scene with Lianne. Meanwhile, Cabazon, wants revenge against Packer for their fight in Saguache. The Nihonjin chief saves Packer by cutting his rope with a katana before beheading Cabazon. Packer, seeing that Polly brought back Lianne, he realizes he does not need her anymore and chooses Polly, the two kiss, only to be frightened by a still-alive but badly maimed Bell.

== Cast ==
- Trey Parker as Alferd Packer (credited as Juan Schwartz (Note: This pseudonym is a reference to "John Schwartze", an alias used by Alferd Packer when he was discovered in Cheyenne, Wyoming.)) (Note: Parker also dubbed over several characters, including the Voice of Doom, two Indian braves, and the singing voice of Frenchy.)
- Toddy Walters as Polly Pry (Note: Moira Kelly was considered to be cast in the role of Polly, but it was ultimately decided not to cast her out of fear that it might damage serious Hollywood aspirations; various screenings of the film credit "M.K." as "The Dropout".)
- Matt Stone as James Humphrey (credited as Mathew Stone) (Note: Stone, dressed in drag, also played the part of a woman prominently seen during the performance of the first verse of "Hang the Bastard".)
- Dian Bachar as George "California" Noon
- Jason McHugh as Frank Miller
- Jon Hegel as Israel Swan
- Ian Hardin as Shannon Wilson Bell
- Duster as Packer's horse, Lianne (Note: About 15 horses shared the role of Lianne. The difference is very noticeable, as the horse keeps shifting colors and sizes throughout the film.)
- Robert Muratore as Jean "Frenchy" Cabazon
- Edward Henwood as O.D. Loutzenheiser/The Cyclops
- Andrew Kemler as Preston Nutter
- Masao Maki as the Chief of the fictitious Nihonjin Indian tribe (credited as Maseo Maki)
- Japanese foreign exchange students as Nihonjin Indians
- Junichi as Junichi
- Tomomi as Tomomi, a young Indian girl whom Noon swoons over
- Audrey Stafferd as the Voice of Doom (Note: This character is referred to in production notes as "Crazy Old Ralph".)
- Randy Parker (Trey Parker's father) as Judge Jerry
- Jessica James Kelly as Tiny Tim/Baby Packer
- Martin Leeper as the Sheriff of Saguache (credited as Marty Leeper)
- Brad Gordon as Mills
- Steve Jackson as the Sheriff of Lake City
- Stan Brakhage as Noon's father
- Don Yannacito as Humphrey's father (Note: Yannacito's last name was misspelled with three Ns in the end credits.)
- Kevin Allen as a passerby who glances over Polly Pry with a confused look as she performs "This Side of Me"
- Lianne Adamo as one of the dancers during the "Hang the Bastard" number (uncredited)
- Chris Graves as a drunken man who plays a cowbell break in "Hang the Bastard" (uncredited)
- Joe McHugh (Jason McHugh's father) as General Store Clerk (uncredited)
- Brody McHugh (Jason McHugh's sister) as Woman leaving store (uncredited)

== Musical numbers ==
1. "Shpadoinkle" – Alferd
2. "Shpadoinkle (Reprise)" – George, Alferd, Shannon, Frank, Swan, and Humphrey
3. "That's All I'm Asking for" – George, Alferd, Shannon, Frank, Swan, and Humphrey.
4. "When I Was on Top of You" – Alferd
5. "Trapper Song" – Frenchy (voice of Parker), Loutzenheiser, and Nutter
6. "This Side of Me" – Polly
7. "Let's Build a Snowman" – Swan
8. "Let's Build a Snowman (Reprise)" – Swan
9. "That's All I'm Asking for (Reprise)" – George, Alferd, Shannon, Frank and Humphrey
10. "Hang the Bastard" – Company
11. "Shpadoinkle (Finale)" – Polly, Alferd, and Company

Contrasting with the musical's generally dark and morbid humor are its cheerful songs, all composed by Parker, including "Let's Build a Snowman", "When I Was on Top of You", "Hang the Bastard", and "Shpadoinkle" (pronounced shpah-doink-ul). The last of these is a transparent parody of the song "Oh, What a Beautiful Mornin'" from the Rodgers & Hammerstein musical Oklahoma!.

Two songs that were originally going to be in the film, but later taken out, were "Shatterproof", a rap song to be sung by Packer during the bar fight scene, and "Don't Be Stupid", a song to be sung by some of the Bingham Canyon miners after the reprise of "Shpadoinkle". An interview with Ian Hardin (now known as Ian Keldin) revealed that Trey thought "Shatterproof" made Packer seem too tough.

== Production ==
The film began as a 3-minute trailer made for a film class, having been an idea Parker and his friends had for a while but also inspired in part by Parker's resentment towards his ex-fiancée Lianne Adamo after discovering her cheating on him not long before their wedding, with Packer's disloyal horse "Lianne" in the final film being based on her. After the trailer drew much attention, Parker and Stone raised around $125,000 and began shooting the full-length film. The film was shot during weekends and on spring break in 1993, and according to Ian Hardin, most of the crew failed their film history class as a result. Filming was done on location throughout Colorado in Denver, Colorado National Monument, Black Canyon, and Ouray, with the courtroom scenes being shot in the actual courthouse that Alferd Packer was tried in, in Lake City, and the town scenes taking place in Provo, Saguache, and the hanging scene being shot in different parts of the Buckskin Joe Old West theme park in Canyon City.

A few incidents happened during filming, such as Parker getting a hairline hip fracture after being thrown from one of the horses playing "Lianne", fights occasionally breaking out among the crew, some of the main cast experiencing cold shock and almost being swept away by strong currents from crossing the icy Gunnison River that doubled for the Green River, as well as inclement weather and even an avalanche complicating shooting.

Despite not reaching a wide audience, Pam Brady, as well her employer Brian Graden, would be among those who saw Cannibal! during its initial release. Brady would recommend Parker and Stone make a TV series based on the film, though Fox, which employed Brady and Graden, would ultimate not pick up this proposed series.

This film was originally titled Alferd Packer: The Musical in 1993. The film premiered on October 31, 1993, in Boulder, Colorado, at a cinema near the University of Colorado campus. A fake protest organized by friends of Parker and Stone, organized along the lines of an animal rights demonstration, took place in front of the theater. The film then played at Raindance Film Festival in October 2004. Parker and Stone attended.

It was not released generally until 1996, however, when Troma Entertainment picked it up and renamed it Cannibal! The Musical out of concern that not enough people outside of Colorado knew who Packer was. Few people outside of Colorado ever saw the film since Troma did not distribute it widely. Parker and Stone's animated satire South Park, which Brady and Graden initially were also key in helping develop, debuted the following year.

Several live productions of the show have been mounted, with excerpts from one live version available on the DVD.

== Home media ==
Following Matt and Trey's success with South Park, Troma re-released the film on VHS and DVD and it enjoyed a decent cult following. The DVD contains a "Drunken Director's Commentary" where Parker and Stone along with most of the cast get drunk as they watch the film, although there are a few times when the commentary cuts out.

The film has since been released on UMD for the Sony PSP. A special edition 13th anniversary DVD was released by Troma with added features, including all-new interviews with the cast and crew.

The film was re-released in November 2008 as the first of the "Tromasterpiece Collection," as Troma considers Cannibal! to be one of its best films. Included in the new two-disc version, with over three hours of special features, never-before-seen deleted material and stage shows. Songs such as "Shatter Proof" and the early short films of Parker and Stone were considered to be a part of the new DVD, but these additions were ultimately rejected.

In September 2024, Boutique label Vinegar Syndrome announced the world premiere Blu-ray edition for release in November of that same year. The disc will include a remaster in 4K with the involvement of original stars Jason McHugh and Dian Bachar

In September 2024, British studio Refuse Films announced a Blu-ray special edition for release in December of that same year. The disc will include a remaster in HD, with the film presented in its original open matte aspect ratio.

== Stage productions ==
There have been several amateur productions of Cannibal! The Musical since 1996. The first was at the Sierra College in Northern California and then at Dad's Garage Theater where it won accolades by fans and the press.

In 2001, Saturday Players launched a six-month off-off-Broadway run of the show that earned critical acclaim and returning audience members.

In 2004, Cannibal made its European debut in Rome at the Teatro di Servi.

In 2005, the first High School group attempted the show at The Ironwood Ridge High School in Tucson, Arizona, but the show was censored by the school and performed off campus as a benefit. Later that year the show made its German debut at the University of Regensburg and played many small colleges and community houses in the US.

In 2006, the show debuted at its first Fringe Festivals in Minneapolis and Victoria, Canada and continued to find adoption by small colleges and community theaters.

In 2007, the Irish stage premiere took place at the Watergate Theatre, Kilkenny in a production by The Devious Theatre Company.

In 2008, The Insurgo Theater Movement launched the show in Las Vegas for the first of several runs by their company. Unexpected Productions launched the first of four October runs of Cannibal in Seattle.

Also in 2008, The Rival Theatre Company produced the first large-scale professional production. The show ran from July 31 to August 25 at the George Square Theatre, Edinburgh for a total of 26 performances. It starred Aimie Atkinson as Polly Pry and James Topping as Alferd Packer. Original film cast member Jason McHugh made a guest appearance as Mr. Mills. Other guest stars included Jim Bowen and The Q Brothers.

In 2011, M.P.M.M. Productions, performed the musical in Winnipeg, Manitoba, Canada during the 2011 Winnipeg Fringe Festival. It won "The Best of Fest" for its venue (meaning it outsold other shows in the venue and was awarded an additional show). The show also debuted in St Louis and Denver with great reviews and enthusiastic casts and audience members.

In May 2012, Logan Donahoo Presents performed a version of the musical in Orlando, Florida during the 2012 Orlando International Fringe Theatre Festival, in the Yellow venue. The show was successful, receiving positive reviews, and winning Patron's Pick for its venue, meaning that it had outsold all of the other shows and was awarded an additional performance.

Trey Parker's Cannibal! The Musical played in Toronto at David Mirvish's Panasonic Theatre for a four-week run (February 10 to March 8, 2015). Additional book, lyrics, and music by Christopher Bond, Aaron Eyre, and Trevor Martin.

It was announced in early 2014 that a production of the show is being produced at the Waterfront Theatre in Vancouver, B.C. by independent traveling theatre troupe Last Chance Productions. The show ran from June 12, 2014, until March 8, 2015, with two separate seating areas (a "Gore Zone" where audience members are subject to splash-zone-esque involvement, and a less messy "Gore-Free Zone".)

Trey Parker's CANNIBAL THE MUSICAL! had its first national tour in 2017 which rehearsed out of Toronto before heading to the Capitol Theatre in Windsor, ON the Canadian cast featured Greg Carruthers, David DiFrancesco, Shaeane Jimenez, Michelle Nash, Taylor Lavigne, Lucas Popowich, Brandon Knox, and Benjamin Zoëy. This production toured to the Overture Center in Madison, Wisconsin and Tennessee Performing Arts Center Andrew Johnson Theater in Nashville, Tennessee.

In 2019, Cannibal the Musical had its Bay Area premiere. It was performed by The Other Other Theatre Company in San Francisco. The show ran from July 21–29 at MoonSpace.

The Town Hall Arts Center in Matt Stone's hometown of Littleton, CO produced a stage production of Cannibal! The Musical for a limited run (October 25, 2024 – November 3, 2024) as part of the 2024-2025 season. Town Hall Arts Center is less than a mile from Alferd Packer's burial site in the Littleton Cemetery.

== Reception ==
On the review aggregator website Rotten Tomatoes, 61% of 18 critics' reviews are positive, with an average rating of 5.2/10. The website's consensus reads: "If you're only going to watch one black comedy about a real-life explorer whose fellow travelers ended up eaten, make it Cannibal! The Musical."

Marc Savlov of The Austin Chronicle enjoyed the film, opining that it was "a ridiculous, over-the-top carnival of gore, sophomorically sly humor, and cheese-whiz choreography that manages -- above all odds -- to be cheerily invigorating as well" before giving it a score of 3/5. Todd Doogan of The Digital Bits praised the film, labelling it a "wacky meshing of 1950s musicals with splatter movies and Farrelly Brothers/Zucker/Abrams-style comedies" that was "simply perfect." In a review written for Empire, Kim Newman gave the "Western horror musical comedy" a score of 3/5 and concluded, "It has its longeurs but there's an air of genial enthusiasm, tempered by sick humour, that is surprisingly engaging." Germain Lussier of Gizmodo commended the "horror comedy musical" and stated, "It's rough around the edges, gross, offensive, and at times a little hard to watch, but the good outweighs the bad so massively, you can't help but fall in love."

Alex Castle of IGN gave the film a score of 6/10 and wrote, "So is it a good movie? That depends on what you're looking for. If you're looking for brief flashes of the brilliance that would become far more stable once South Park got going, you'll find them here. If you're looking for a movie that can stand alone, out of the shadow of its creators' later accomplishments, you may be disappointed." Anita Gates of The New York Times felt the film was "amateurish" and "pretty stupid" but "not completely appalling" with "flashes of real humor" and "refreshingly ludicrous notes that even people old enough to see this movie without a guardian can appreciate." Allan Ulrich of the SFGate had a positive response to the film, calling it a "tasty 90 minutes of yummy production numbers and intense spiritual crises" and concluding, "Admittedly, Cannibal: The Musical seems a bit overextended; the soppy ballad delivered by the newspaper reporter who believes in the hero's innocence doesn't make it even as bogus R & H. But it will take a truly jaded soul to push away from the table before this often hilarious meal is over."

== See also ==
- Ravenous, a similar film about Packer and the Donner Party
- "Helen Keller! The Musical", an episode of South Park
- The Book of Mormon, a Tony Award-winning Broadway musical about The Book of Mormon by Stone, Parker, and Robert Lopez
- Poultrygeist: Night of the Chicken Dead, a 2006 film directed by Lloyd Kaufman
- BASEketball, a 1998 sports comedy film
- South Park: Bigger, Longer & Uncut, a 1999 adult animated black-comedy musical film
- Team America: World Police, a 2004 adult puppet film
- List of cult films
