= BASEketball =

1998 film by David Zucker

- Theatrical release poster
- Directed by: David Zucker
- Written by: David Zucker; Robert LoCash; Jeff Wright; Lewis Friedman
- Produced by: David Zucker; Robert LoCash; Gil Netter
- Starring: Trey Parker; Matt Stone; Yasmine Bleeth; Jenny McCarthy; Robert Vaughn; Ernest Borgnine; Dian Bachar
- Cinematography: Steven Mason
- Edited by: Jeffrey Reiner
- Music by: Ira Newborn
- Production company: Zucker Brothers Productions
- Distributed by: Universal Pictures
- Release date: July 31, 1998
- Running time: 103 minutes
- Country: United States
- Language: English
- Budget: $25 million
- Box office: $7 million

BASEketball is a 1998 American sports comedy film co-written and directed by David Zucker, starring South Park creators Trey Parker and Matt Stone, and costarring Yasmine Bleeth, Jenny McCarthy, Robert Vaughn, Ernest Borgnine and Dian Bachar. The film is about BASEketball, a hybrid sport combining baseball and basketball, invented by Zucker in the 1980s. Parker and Stone play childhood friends who envision it as something they could win against athletes. It becomes an overnight sensation and a target of corporate sponsorship.

Originally intended as a television series, which had a pilot episode filmed which starred Chris Rock, Zucker transitioned to film and wanted Chris Farley for the lead role but instead cast Parker and Stone after the success of South Park.

This is the only work involving the stars that was neither written, directed nor produced by them. It was a box office disappointment with mixed critical reviews, though Zucker's direction and the supporting cast (particularly Borgnine and Vaughn) was praised.

== Plot ==
Milwaukee slackers and lifelong best friends Joseph R. "Coop" Cooper and Douglas "Doug" Remer gate crash the college graduation party of a high-school friend and are shunned by their classmates. They find themselves outside drinking beer and shooting a basketball when two classmates challenge them to a game. After seeing that their opponents are very good at basketball, they say they will only play a game they picked up in the streets (while secretly inventing the rules as they play, based on and combining elements of both basketball and baseball). After winning, they decide to refine the rules to the game and Coop makes the first BASEketball out of a La-Z-Boy chair. Their friend, Kenny "Squeak" Scolari, tags along and the sport becomes very popular in the neighborhood over the next six months.

Businessman Ted Denslow meets Coop and Remer and proposes the creation of the National BASEketball League (NBL) along with numerous rules in place to prevent its decline: teams cannot switch cities, players cannot be traded, nobody can make money via corporate sponsorship deals and anyone who wants to play can freely participate, with Denslow stating that "anyone can be a sports hero". Though reluctant, Coop ultimately accepts the opportunity.

Five years later, the NBL is in full swing with teams, fans, stadiums and a major championship, the Denslow Cup. Denslow owns the Milwaukee Beers, Coop and Remer's team. During the championship game, he dies from choking on a hot dog, causing Coop to miss his shot and costing the Beers the game. Denslow's will names Coop as owner of the Beers for one year on the condition that they win the next Denslow Cup; otherwise, ownership reverts to Denslow's widow Yvette. Coop and Remer then meet Jenna Reed, head of the Dream Come True Foundation, and Joey, one of the children in her care and a passionate fan of BASEketball; Coop, Remer and Squeak begin spending time with the two, with Coop eventually forming a romantic relationship with Jenna.

Baxter Cain, owner of the Dallas Felons, wants to remove Denslow's rules preventing monetization of the sport, having been unable to do so during Denslow's lifetime. Coop refuses to accept any changes; Cain partners with Yvette as he tries to make the Beers lose the next Denslow Cup so she will own the team. The Beers still continue winning games and heading toward the championship. Cain approaches Remer, telling him that he made an offer to Coop, but Coop refused without telling Remer. Remer confronts Coop about what Cain told him, and Coop quickly compromises by declaring Remer part owner of the team.

Later, Cain cuts the funding to Jenna's foundation in an attempt to get Coop and Remer to adopt a clothing line; Coop opposes it, but Remer agrees and becomes conceited with his newfound A-list status. After the semifinals, Cain blackmails Coop and Remer into losing or forfeiting the Denslow Cup game, or else he will inform the public that the clothing line has been produced through child labor in Calcutta, thus ruining the team and Jenna's foundation. Jenna learns about the scandal and breaks up with Coop, as Coop and Remer blame each other for the controversy, with Remer declaring that Coop was no longer his best friend.

With their friendship dissolved, Coop goes to Calcutta, aiming to resolve the situation by replacing the child workers with adults. Returning to the championship game just as it begins, Coop and Remer still argue with each other and the Beers are losing; by the seventh-inning stretch, the Beers are down 16–0. Finally infuriated by the pair's feuding, Squeak gives the stadium an impassioned speech, reminding Coop and Remer where they came from, how much they changed everyone else's lives and what they risk losing if they lose the game. Motivated, Coop and Remer reconcile as Yvette, also moved by Squeak's speech, breaks off her alliance with Cain. After shifting their focus back in the game, they are poised to win when Coop's La-Z-Boy BASEketball pops. Joey brings a crestfallen Coop a new BASEketball made from a Barcalounger, restoring his confidence. After a risky last throw, they win the Denslow Cup. Jenna and Coop reconcile as Yvette makes out with Remer, and both men skate around the stadium with their new trophy.

== Cast ==
- Trey Parker as Joe "Coop" Cooper
- Matt Stone as Doug Remer
- Dian Bachar as Kenny "Squeak" Scolari
- Charles Hubbell as Sam Cooper
- Yasmine Bleeth as Jenna Reed
- Jenny McCarthy as Yvette Denslow
- Ernest Borgnine as Ted Denslow
- Robert Vaughn as Baxter Cain
- Trevor Einhorn as Joey Thomas
- Frank McCarthy as Dr. Kaiser
- Mike Schmidt as Grunsky
- Bob Costas as himself
- Al Michaels as himself
- Patrick McCracken as Watson

Cameo appearances

- Kareem Abdul-Jabbar
- Dale Earnhardt
- Reggie Jackson
- Joey Diaz
- Jim Lampley
- Kenny Mayne
- Tim McCarver
- Pat O'Brien
- Dan Patrick
- Reel Big Fish
- Victoria Silvstedt
- Robert Stack
- Greg Grunberg
- Kevin Michael Richardson
- Peter Tuiasosopo
- Kato Kaelin

== Production ==
David Zucker, who then had a first-look deal at Universal Pictures, pitched the idea of a low-brow comedy about a game he invented and played in the 1980s. Zucker had previously attempted to adapt the idea into a television series without success. A pilot episode was filmed which starred Chris Rock, but it did not materialize into a series.

When Zucker got the green-light from Universal, he had wanted Chris Farley to play the lead role before casting Trey Parker and Matt Stone due to their work with South Park becoming a huge hit. Parker and Stone agreed to do the movie under the assumption that their show would have been canceled by the time filming began. This did not happen, so they worked on both projects simultaneously.

Principal photography began on January 13, 1998, and ended on March 28, 1998, in Los Angeles, California.

== Soundtrack ==
The soundtrack featured a ska cover of Norwegian band A-ha's signature single "Take On Me" by Reel Big Fish. The band also appears as the live entertainment at the home stadium of the Milwaukee Beers, playing their song "Beer" amongst other songs. The soundtrack also includes a cover of the War song "Why Can't We Be Friends?" by Smash Mouth and a cover of Harry Belafonte's "Jump in the Line (Shake, Senora)" by Cherry Poppin' Daddies.

== Critical reception ==
=== Box office ===
BASEketball was released on July 31, 1998, opening alongside The Parent Trap, The Negotiator, and Ever After. It debuted in the #11 spot in its opening weekend, which was led by Saving Private Ryan. Its domestic total was $7,027,290.

=== Critical response ===
On Rotten Tomatoes, BASEketball has an approval rating of 40%, with an average rating of 5.30/10, based on 50 reviews from critics. The website's critics consensus reads, "Baseketball isn't just a succession of fouls thanks to the comedic zip of David Zucker's direction, but sophomoric gags and a lack of performance hustle by Trey Parker and Matt Stone makes this satire a clumsy bunt." On Metacritic, the film has a weighted average score of 38 out of 100, based on reviews from 18 critics, indicating "generally unfavorable" reviews. Audiences surveyed by CinemaScore gave the film a grade B on scale of A to F.

In a positive review with Variety, Leonard Klady said BASEketball "has the heightened entertainment challenge of presenting an invented sport ... The film's physical comedy should translate well internationally and chalk up high scores on video". The film was awarded four stars out of five by Empire magazine's Ian Freer, who called it funny but described the humor as sometimes hit-and-miss. Conversely, Los Angeles Times' Jack Mathews labeled the film as sleep-inducing and "by far the most inane and badly written of the comedies made by any of the creators of the classic 1980 sendup Airplane!". Michael O'Sullivan in The Washington Post'' called the film "dark, dull, witless and hobbled by poor comic timing," comparing its gross-out humor unfavorably to that of There's Something About Mary. Roger Ebert echoed this sentiment in his negative review in the Chicago Sun-Times, giving the film one and a half stars out of four and saying the film "tries to buy laughs with puerile shocks".

=== Accolades ===
For their roles in the film, Yasmine Bleeth and Jenny McCarthy were nominated at the 1998 Golden Raspberry Awards, for the Worst Actress and Worst Supporting Actress awards, respectively. Bleeth lost to the Spice Girls (for Spice World) while McCarthy lost to Maria Pitillo (Godzilla).

== In popular culture ==
In response to a negative review from Roger Ebert, Parker and Stone named South Park's second season's eleventh episode "Roger Ebert Should Lay Off the Fatty Foods". Parker and Stone also referenced BASEketball's negative reception in South Park's season-eight episode "The Passion of the Jew", when Stan Marsh and Kenny McCormick decide to go to Mel Gibson's house in Malibu to hold him responsible and to get their money back from him due to them not liking his movie The Passion of the Christ, stating "This is just like when we got our money back for BASEketball!"

BASEketball is credited with coining the Internet slang term "derp". Parker and Stone later referenced the term in South Park's third season episode "The Succubus", where Chef is replaced by Mr. Derp.

== See also ==
- "Sarcastaball", an episode of South Park with a similar premise.
- Johnny Sylvester, sick child that Babe Ruth promised to hit a home run for.
