= The Last of the Meheecans =

- South Park episode
- Episode no.: Season 15; Episode 9
- Directed by: Trey Parker
- Written by: Trey Parker
- Production code: 1509
- Original air date: October 12, 2011

Episode chronology
← Previous "Ass Burgers"	Next → "Bass to Mouth"
- South Park season 15

"The Last of the Meheecans" is the ninth episode of the fifteenth season of the American animated television series South Park, and the 218th episode of the series overall. It first aired on Comedy Central in the United States on October 12, 2011. In the episode, what begins as an innocent game between the boys turns serious when Cartman joins the U.S. Border Patrol.

The episode was written by series co-creator Trey Parker and is rated TV-MA L in the United States. The plot references illegal immigration to the United States across the Mexican border and the show Border Wars. The title is derived from The Last of the Mohicans, complete with a title card with the same typeface.

== Plot ==
The boys play "Texans vs. Mexicans" at a sleepover at Cartman's house, a game in which the "Mexicans" (led at first by Butters, and then Kyle due to Butters' poor leadership skills) attempt to elude the "border patrol" (led by an overly gleeful Cartman) and cross the border into Texas (Cartman's backyard). All of the "Mexicans" do so, winning the game, much to Cartman's irritation. However, Butters is not among his teammates, having been lost, and when Cartman later realizes that Butters is not present, he realizes the game is not over. As Butters' teammates begin searching for him, Cartman's team resumes protecting the backyard. Butters' team puts up fliers to help find him, but Cartman responds by putting up some of his own that urge people to shoot him on sight, intent on winning the game even if Butters dies.

As Butters tries to find his way back, he is struck by a passing car. The couple in the car, believing Butters to be a Mexican immigrant named "Mantequilla" (Spanish for "butter"), take him to their home and employ him as a stereotypical Mexican servant, giving him menial jobs to perform such as cleaning windows and washing dishes. However, the couple eventually abandons Butters at an El Pollo Loco restaurant, believing that he needs to be with his "own kind" to be happy. Inside, Butters regales the staff with tales of his imaginary exploits. The staff recognize him from "missing" posters put up by his friends and, believing him to be someone famous, they start to question the value of their new lives in the United States. They misinterpret Butters' desire to "cross the border" and rejoin his friends as a desire to return to Mexico, and a mass exodus of Mexican emigrants soon begins. As more and more Mexicans leave, Americans realize they cannot keep up with their newfound menial labor tasks due to having become complacent and lazy, creating a labor shortage and damaging the U.S. economy.

Cartman joins the actual United States Border Patrol as a volunteer, where he is instructed to stop Mexicans from crossing the border, regardless of which direction they are traveling. Mexican emigrants start being rounded up and ordered to get back to work. Butters, as "Mantequilla", is hailed as a hero in Mexico, in a scene reminiscent of a similar scene in the film Monty Python's Life of Brian.

He is received in the Zócalo and is credited with instilling a sense of national pride in the Mexican people. However, he soon becomes homesick and attempts to return to the United States. While crossing the border, Butters is spotted by border patrol agents, who are overjoyed in their belief a Mexican wants to enter the United States and make no attempt to stop him. Recognizing Butters, an enraged Cartman tries to prevent him from crossing. With the Border Patrol's help, Butters successfully eludes Cartman and re-enters the United States, winning the game.

When the boys are reunited at Cartman's house, Cartman once again pouts over his loss of the game, as the gang rejoices at Butters' return. When Butters suggests he be leader next time, Stan and Kyle suggest that while he is a great Mexican team player, he is not a great leader of Mexicans as it took him more than two weeks to cross the border. In response, Butters stands up and gestures with his hands, causing Mexicans everywhere to chant loudly enough for the boys to hear them.

== Production ==
In the show's commentary, the creators describe their distaste when cops, advisers and television producers get together. Border Wars and DEA were two of the shows parodied.

The creators picked Butters as the leader of the Mexicans since "Mantequilla" is Spanish for "Butter," which they thought "sounded kinda noble."

Parker wrote the "Work, Mexican, Work" song six years prior to this episode.

== Home release ==
"The Last of the Meheecans", along with the thirteen other episodes from South Park's fifteenth season, was released on a three-disc DVD set and two-disc Blu-ray set in the United States on March 27, 2012. The sets included brief audio commentaries by Parker and Stone for each episode, a collection of deleted scenes, and two special mini-features, "Behind The Scenes of City Sushi" and the documentary Six Days To Air – The Making Of South Park. IGN gave the season an 8/10.

== Reception ==
The episode received positive reviews from critics. Ryan McGee of The A.V. Club graded the episode a B+, stating, "'The Last of the Meheecans' isn’t really about immigration reform so much as it's about the narcissistic viewpoint that America must be, as a point of irrefutable fact, the best place in the world to live. For some, that’s a fairly ballsy thing to say, but the way in which Parker/Stone say it bypasses political grandstanding and casts their gaze instead on our supposed understanding of those that have immigrated to America and currently live/work here". Eric Hochberger of TV Fanatic gave the episode a 3.4/5. Mike Nasiatka of 411Mania gave the episode a 7/10, saying the episode was entertaining along with having a killer song.

IGN gave the episode an 8/10 stating, "Butters episodes always provide good material, and this one is no exception."

The episode was never aired in Mexico or Latin America, since the TV network Comedy Central Latinoamérica thought the episode would be considered offensive, particularly the scene when Cartman appears to kill a bunch of Mexicans with his taser.
