= Bass to Mouth =

- South Park episode
- Episode no.: Season 15; Episode 10
- Directed by: Trey Parker
- Written by: Trey Parker
- Production code: 1510
- Original air date: October 19, 2011

Episode chronology
← Previous "The Last of the Meheecans"	Next → "Broadway Bro Down"
- South Park season 15

"Bass to Mouth" is the tenth episode of the fifteenth season of the American animated television series South Park, and the 219th episode overall. It first aired on Comedy Central in the United States on October 19, 2011. Much of the episode's plot alludes to WikiLeaks and its surrounding controversy.

The episode was written by series co-creator Trey Parker and is rated TV-MA L in the United States.

== Plot ==
A new gossip website named Eavesdropper gains popularity among the students of South Park Elementary by posting embarrassing information gleaned through unlawful access to the confidential phone calls and emails of the school and its student body. While Eric Cartman is elated at the embarrassment of one such student, Pete Melman, who defecated in his pants while in class, and required his mother to bring him a clean pair of jeans, the school administrators are displeased. Recalling that a year earlier, another student, Corey Duran, suffered a similar incident and committed suicide as the result of Cartman spearheading a campaign of ridicule and torment against him, Mr. Mackey, Principal Victoria and Mr. Adler ask Cartman not to let the same thing happen to Pete. Though Cartman initially rebuffs their request, telling them that it is impossible to contain such an incident, they offer to make it worth Cartman's while, piquing his interest.

Cartman engineers a repeat of Pete's incident by giving another student, Jenny Simons, cupcakes laced with laxatives, causing her to defecate in her pants in the middle of class. After Jenny breaks her pelvis by attempting suicide, Cartman is pleased, feeling that Jenny's suicide attempt will make everyone forget about Pete, but the administrators angrily explain to him that they did not want anyone to attempt suicide. After they tell him that he must fix this or forfeit that which they promised him, Cartman devises a plan to reward the student body for their recent state exam scores with a pizza party, at which they will feed the students pizza laced with laxatives and Arby's Horsey Sauce, thus causing the entire student body to suffer the same misfortune as Pete and Jenny, diffusing the torment they experienced on the grounds that it would be too many people to ridicule at once. Although initially outraged at Cartman's idea, they realize they don't have a better one, and decide to implement it.

The student body, save for Kyle Broflovski, continues to enjoy Eavesdropper until Stan Marsh has a change of heart when the site publishes information from a private email about his attraction towards another girl's buttocks that he sent to Kenny McCormick. This revelation angers his girlfriend, Wendy Testaburger. Rallying the student body against Eavesdropper, the students discover from the IP addresses of the site's postings that they are being made from the school's music room, where they discover a blond-haired rat at a computer terminal. The rat escapes, though they discover that his name is Wikileaks.

Meanwhile, Lemmiwinks, the old school gerbil from the episode "The Death Camp of Tolerance", who is now Vernon Trumski's pet, is visited by the ghostly Frog King, who previously guided him to safety in that episode. The Frog King tells him that Lemmiwinks' brother, Wikileaks, is spreading terrible rumors based on hacked emails. When Lemmiwinks exhibits reluctance to confront his own brother, the Frog Prince and his colleague, the Sparrow Prince, send another spirit guide, the Catatafish, to Stan and his friends, instructing them to go to Trumski's house and take Lemmiwinks.

As Cartman and the administrators prepare the pizza, the administrators uphold their end of the agreement by presenting singer Selena Gomez to Cartman, and then beating her up, much to Cartman's delight. Their actions are observed by Wikileaks, who announces to his site's visitors that he will soon reveal his biggest story yet. As the public reacts to this announcement, the school administrators, worried that they will be fired when their plan is exposed by Eavesdropper, devise to distract the public with an even bigger story, that of a student's suicide. Mackey decides that they will engineer Cartman's suicide by literally throwing him under a bus.

The children procure Lemmiwinks from Vernon's home, and take him to the school by bus, but on the way there, the school administrators throw Cartman in front of it, and declare that Cartman committed suicide. During this sequence, a parody of the song Down, Down To Goblin Town from the 1977 adaptation of The Hobbit, is heard. The students and administrators continue with Lemmiwinks to the school, where he confronts and kills Wikileaks, allowing Mackey to delete the content of Eavesdropper. Cartman, who suffered only a broken arm and leg, gets revenge on the administrators by giving them Horsey Sauce-laced cupcakes, causing Mackey to suffer explosive diarrhea that propels him through the hallway.

== Production ==
In the creator commentary for the episode, creators Matt Stone and Trey Parker said that the episode started with just the idea of Cartman helping the kid who crapped his pants before they realized that Wikileaks sounds like Lemmiwinks, and it became a TMZ based episode. The fight between Wikileaks and Lemmiwinks was just a rotoscoped animation of real footage of two squirrels fighting.

== Reception ==
Ryan McGee of The A.V. Club graded the episode a B, stating, "What seemed initially like the show’s take on school bullying turned into an epic struggle between two rats for supremacy. While the two main plots did intersect, they spent too long apart to truly feel like one and the same story. Both had strong elements, but didn’t fully mix." Ramsey Isler of IGN gave the episode a 7.5/10 "Good" rating. Eric Hochberger of TV Fanatic gave the episode a 4/5. IGN gave the season an 8/10.

== Home release ==
"Bass to Mouth", along with the thirteen other episodes from The Complete Fifteenth Season, was released on a three-disc DVD set and two-disc Blu-ray set in the United States on March 27, 2012. The sets included brief audio commentaries by Parker and Stone for each episode, a collection of deleted scenes, and two special mini-features, "Behind The Scenes of City Sushi" and the documentary Six Days To Air – The Making Of South Park.
