= Suggestive dialogue =

Suggestive dialogue can refer to:

- Innuendo, a remark or question that implies something, usually derogatory, about the subject without expressly stating it.
- Suggestive dialogue, one of the criteria used to determine TV Parental Guidelines in the United States.
