= Broadway Bro Down =

- South Park episode
- Episode no.: Season 15; Episode 11
- Directed by: Trey Parker
- Written by: Trey Parker; Robert Lopez (uncredited)
- Production code: 1511
- Original air date: October 26, 2011

Episode chronology
← Previous "Bass to Mouth"	Next → "1%"
- South Park season 15

"Broadway Bro Down" is the eleventh episode of the fifteenth season of the American animated television series South Park, and the 220th episode overall. It first aired on Comedy Central in the United States on October 26, 2011. In this episode, Randy Marsh discovers that Broadway musicals contain subtext that encourage women to give their partners oral sex, while Shelly starts dating a young vegan boy named Larry Feegan.

The episode was written by Trey Parker and Robert Lopez as an uncredited writer, who previously worked with Parker and Matt Stone on their Broadway musical, The Book of Mormon. This episode is rated TV-MA-LS in the United States.

== Plot ==
Randy Marsh hears from his male co-workers that taking women to Broadway shows sexually arouses them into performing oral sex. Randy takes Sharon to see Wicked, where he is informed by a theatergoer that women are aroused by its subtext. When Randy returns to the auditorium, he now hears the actors underhandedly referencing "blowjobs" in the songs' lyrics. On the ride home Sharon performs fellatio on him, and as a result, Randy decides to take her to New York City to see all the Broadway shows, leaving Stan and Shelly with the Feegans, who are vegans. During their dinner with the Feegans, Shelly gets into a confrontation with Mr. Feegan over letting his son Larry decide for himself if he wants to be a vegan. Larry develops greater confidence as a result of this, and the two eventually start dating.

Upon returning to South Park, Randy laments the fact that he does not live closer to a major theater venue like Broadway. He decides to produce his own musical, though he discards subtext by having the show be about blowjobs and explicitly mentioning them. This attracts the ire of Stephen Sondheim, Stephen Schwartz, Andrew Lloyd Webber, and Elton John. The four are depicted as hypermasculine, beer-drinking heterosexuals who hang out at Hooters and are called "Bros". They chastise Randy for the overt use of sexuality in his play, explaining to him that the lack of any real subtext would expose the truth behind Broadway shows. Randy dismisses their criticisms, but after another meeting, in which they confront each other with verbal challenges, Randy agrees to accept their assistance, and renames his play The Woman in White.

Randy returns home and learns that Sharon gave Shelly two tickets to see Wicked with Larry. Horrified at the prospect of his daughter engaging in oral sex, Randy races to Denver with Sharon, frantically revealing to her the truth about Broadway shows. Randy dons a Spider-Man costume and swings through the auditorium, intentionally knocking out several patrons and production personnel before breaking open a water main. This forces the play to be shut down, as well as fatally drowning Larry, much to Shelly's grief. Later, Randy apologizes to Sharon for taking her to the theater to get oral sex in return. Sharon responds with hesitation but is glad the musicals brought them closer together. The episode ends with a promo for The Book of Mormon.

== Production ==
Trey Parker and Matt Stone had just finished working with composer Robert Lopez in the Broadway musical The Book of Mormon before this season of South Park commenced. During the collaboration, the duo offered Lopez a chance to come to their studio to create an episode with them and workshop ideas. He arrived on a Thursday at Halloween-time, so the notion of a generic Halloween-themed episode was tossed around. Broadway and musicals were never explicitly on the table until the idea of "trying to make Broadway cool for dudes" came up. They were anxious about the number of songs - albeit short ones - that they had to write. They kept on putting this off as they needed time to hash out the story. They ended up frantically writing songs on the following Tuesday. Trey and Matt thoroughly enjoyed the one-off experience and expressed an interest in collaborating with Lopez again, not necessarily in the context of a musical episode.

== Reception ==
Ramsey Isler of IGN gave the episode a 7.5 out of 10, writing, "When it comes down to it, it's the one-liners and the strength of the A-plot that make this episode work. Had it not been for the annoying repetition and the near-useless B-plot, this would have been one of my favorites of the season so far. But the episode accomplishes the neat trick of poking fun at a topic while still expressing love for it, and that makes up for a lot". Ryan McGee of The A.V. Club graded the episode an A, stating, "The show has long featured the musical stylings of its co-creators, but rarely has that skill been deployed as effectively as tonight’s masterful half-hour ... It managed to be incredibly sweet while being ridiculously filthy. It mocked what it loved while never losing sight of that love in the process. In short, it was pure South Park." Eric Hochberger of TV Fanatic rated the episode 3/5 stars, commenting "There were definitely some fun theater references, including the most appropriate costume Randy could have grabbed to sabotage a play, Spider-Man, but was the one-note joke of the blow job really enough to sustain the full half hour of laughs? For me, not so much", and adding that the B plot "seemed to tie-in nicely with the Broadway adventure at the end, but it still felt undeveloped". Aly Semigram of Entertainment Weekly said "The episode could have just been a one-off about Broadway and worked just fine, but by bringing Spider-Man — a show that’s been out of the spotlight for a while now — into the mix, it felt somewhat outdated."
