= A History Channel Thanksgiving =

- South Park episode
- Episode no.: Season 15; Episode 13
- Directed by: Trey Parker
- Written by: Trey Parker
- Production code: 1513
- Original air date: November 9, 2011

Episode chronology
← Previous "1%"	Next → "The Poor Kid"
- South Park season 15

"A History Channel Thanksgiving" is the thirteenth episode of the fifteenth season of the American animated television series South Park, and the 222nd episode overall. It first aired on Comedy Central in the United States on November 9, 2011. In the episode, the boys accidentally uncover the true origins of Thanksgiving after watching a History Channel documentary alleging that aliens were present at the original harvest feast in 1621. It parodies the television series Ancient Aliens, the 2011 film Thor and for-profit colleges.

The episode was written and directed by series co-creator Trey Parker and is rated TV-MA L in the United States.

== Plot ==
After a lecture from 1/16th Cherokee Indian David "Running Horse" Sawitski, the boys are assigned to write a report on the history of Thanksgiving. Eric Cartman is displeased with the assignment, and suggests the group watch the History Channel for research. The show Ancient Aliens suggests the first Thanksgiving in 1621 was influenced by the presence of extraterrestrials. Despite Kyle's outrage at the program's arguments, he is outvoted as the boys believe the narrative would be more entertaining as a source for their report. After turning in their reports, agents from the History Channel demand the boys tell them where they got their information on aliens, which matches History's own information. When the boys explain they derived their knowledge from that program, the head agent sees this "coincidence" as validation of History's theories, and shows the boys' testimonials on a subsequent program, crediting Stan as a "History Expert", and Kyle as a "Professor of Thanksgiving—DeVry Institute", despite the fact that Kyle angrily asserts that he believes the idea is inconceivable. This incurs the wrath of Sawitski, who, angered at the proliferation of falsehoods about Native American history, shows up at Kyle's house and holds him, Stan and Kenny at gunpoint.

Captain Standish of Plymouth, a planet in Canis Major whose inhabitants resemble colonial era American Pilgrims, falls to Earth. On Plymouth, the Pilgrim leader rallies his people, saying that their enemies, the Indians, have raided their stuffing mines, which leads to a stuffing shortage on Earth that causes Cartman to panic. Standish shows up at Kyle's house, kills Sawitski, and asks Kyle for help returning to his planet. After Natalie Portman drives them to a wooded area, Standish shows Kyle a map of five planets: Earth, Plymouth, Indi, Colthenheim and Green Lantern World, which are connected by wormholes that, on the map, resemble the hand-traced drawings of turkeys made by schoolchildren. Standish explains that his people and their enemies were indeed responsible for the first Thanksgiving, and warns Kyle that because the 300-year treaty between Plymouth and Indi has ended, the Indians will plunder the Plymouth stuffing mines. Agents from the History Channel appear, and when they tell Standish that they failed to open the wormhole to Plymouth by drawing the turkey symbol at Plymouth Rock, Standish informs them that they need Natalie Portman, who is the Keeper of the Portal. After being wined and dined by Kyle, Portman "opens her wormhole", sending Standish back to Plymouth, where he vanquishes the Indians.

Back on Earth, Standish's campaign against the Indians is related in another History TV special, which also adds the new theory that the first Thanksgiving was haunted, much to Kyle's outrage.

== Production and cultural references ==
In the creator commentary for the episode, Trey Parker and Matt Stone said that this was the first idea they came up with for the season and intended to save it for the last episode. However as they struggled to come up with other ideas and planned to make the Thanksgiving special two-parts before abandoning the idea. Captain Standish, when talking to Kyle, says "he who controls the stuffing controls the universe." This is a reference to a line from David Lynch's 1984 movie, Dune, "he who controls the spice controls the universe."

== Reception ==
The episode received mixed to positive reviews.

Ryan McGhee of The A.V. Club graded the episode a "B", stating: "Tonight's South Park spent absolutely no time dwelling on the events of last week, favoring instead an attack on The History Channel, apophenia, and Natalie Portman. When people think back on this season, this won't be an episode that will immediately spring to mind by any stretch. But as far as silly episodes written and drawn by people who have seen a lot of Thor recently, this wasn't bad."

Ramsey Isler of IGN gave the episode a 7.5 out of 10, stating: "The story wasted no time getting into its parody of the so-called 'history' channel. The aim is placed squarely on Ancient Aliens specifically, and the direction is nicely done. The tone of the parody shifts as the episode turns into an odd sort of spoof/homage of the Thor movie. We've got the Native Americans as the Ice Giants and the Pilgrims as the Asgardians, and Natalie Portman tacked on for seemingly no real purpose. Overall it's still an entertaining watch, but if it had more focus it could have been something really special."

Johnny Firecloud of CraveOnline (now Mandatory) gave the episode a 5 out of 10, opining that it was not funny, likening the episode to "an acid trip laced with way too much strychnine". Firecloud sympathized with those who feel that the series is "an overloaded mess", and thought this episode a rationale for possible series cancellation.

Erik Kain of Forbes praised the episode's jabs at for-profit colleges DeVry and the University of Phoenix.
