= 1% (South Park) =

- South Park episode
- Episode no.: Season 15; Episode 12
- Directed by: Trey Parker
- Written by: Trey Parker
- Production code: 1512
- Original air date: November 2, 2011

Episode chronology
| ← Previous "Broadway Bro Down" | Next → "A History Channel Thanksgiving" |
- South Park season 15

"1%" is the twelfth episode of the fifteenth season of the American animated television series South Park, and the 221st episode overall. It first aired on Comedy Central in the United States on November 2, 2011. In the episode, Cartman feels persecuted after he is blamed for causing his school to attain a low score on a national fitness test. As he confides in his sapient stuffed animals, they end up becoming targeted for mutilation.

The episode was written by series co-creator Trey Parker, and is a parody of the Occupy Wall Street movement and the late-2000s recession.

== Plot ==
The assembled student body of South Park Elementary is informed that they have scored the lowest in the entire country on the Presidential Fitness Test due to Eric Cartman’s extremely poor health, which single-handedly ruined what would have been the school's otherwise acceptable average; as punishment, the students are forced to alternate physical education in place of recess for four weeks. When they rebuke Cartman for this, he accuses them of being "the 99%" that is "ganging up" on him, the 1%, but when Craig Tucker dismissively tells him to go home and cry to his stuffed animals as usual, Cartman does just that. As he commiserates with his five stuffed animals, he concludes that the Fitness Test is Barack Obama's fault and furthermore that he is being blamed because it is politically incorrect to blame a black president: going as far as accusing the student-filled cafeteria of being a "99% rally" held to protest his unhealthy lifestyle.

This inspires Butters Stotch and Jimmy Valmer to form a 99% club to protest their being punished for Cartman's poor health. An angry group of fifth graders agrees: saying that it is time to make Cartman suffer. When the head of the Colorado Division of the President's Council on Fitness, Sports, and Nutrition refuses to drop Cartman's test scores from the school's average, Butters and Jimmy stage a two-man protest outside his office that, despite its size, attracts the attention of the police, who create a two square mile perimeter around them, and the news media, who mistakenly report that they are occupying the Red Robin two doors down from the Council office.

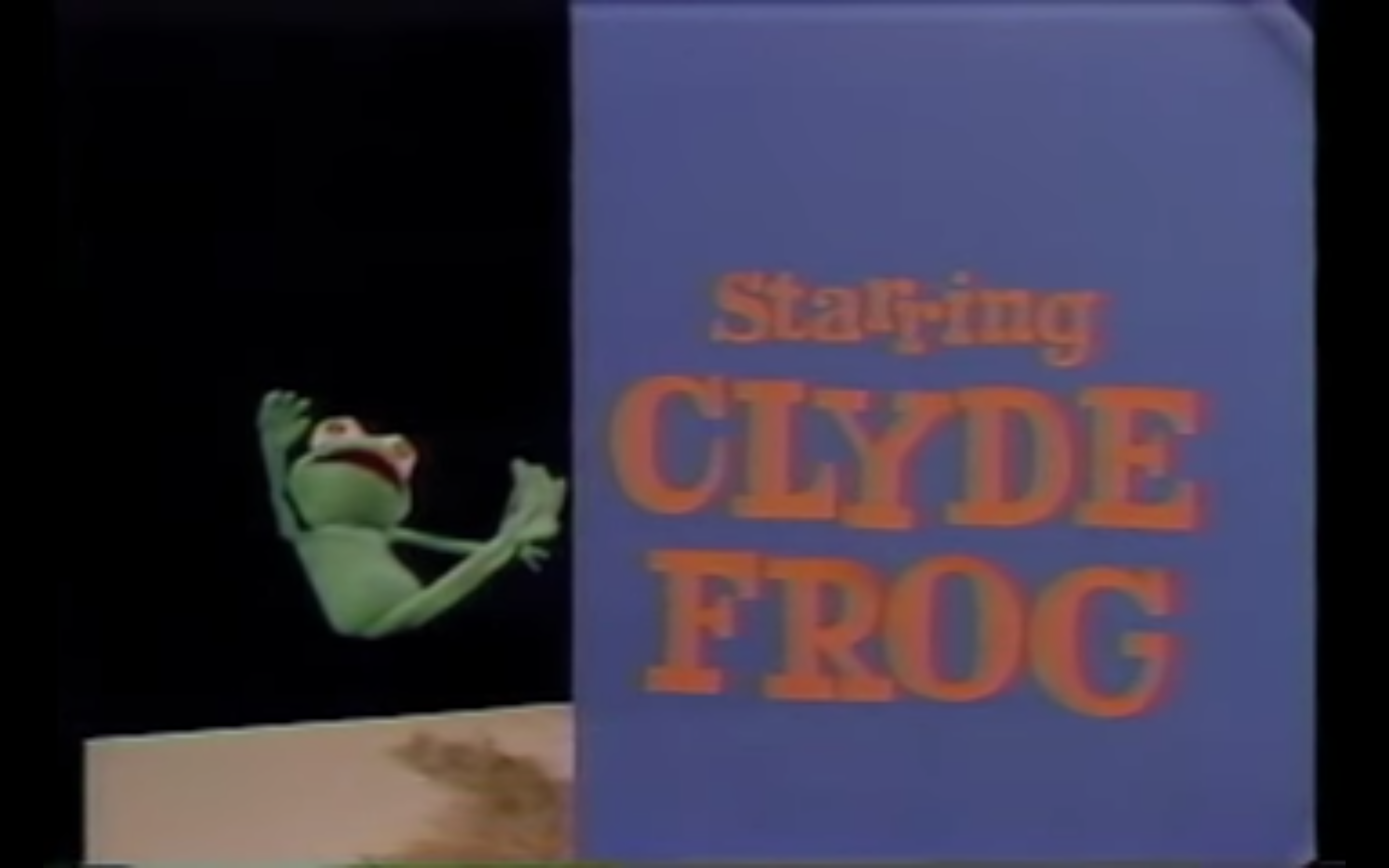
The Clyde Frog toy in South Park is based on the marionette character Clyde Frog, who first appeared in About Safety in 1972, and was later spun off into the eponymous The Clyde Frog Show.

Meanwhile, Cartman discovers his beloved stuffed animals being mutilated and destroyed one by one, beginning with his long-beloved Clyde Frog, nailed to a tree with his stuffing ripped out, and the word "VENGEANCE" written beneath him. Cartman regards these attacks as acts of murder, and holds a funeral service for Clyde Frog: asserting the stuffed animal was "the perfect friend" due to its inability to disagree with him, and blaming Kyle Broflovski for the murder: elaborating that he believes "years of Jewish propaganda and left-wing lies" are to blame for his actions. The students are told they will be paid $5 to attend the funeral, but are outraged when Cartman asserts that "five dollars has been donated in each of [their] names to the Clyde's Law foundation".

When Stan Marsh, Kyle Broflovski, and Kenny McCormick ask the fifth-graders whether they are behind the mutilations, they do not give a straightforward answer, but state that Cartman has had a comeuppance coming his way for a long time, and that because Stan and the other fourth-graders have failed to rein in Cartman's problematic behavior, the fifth-graders have something big planned to remedy the problem, in which they warn Stan and his friends not to interfere. When Peter Panda, another of Cartman's toys, is destroyed by a fire set in Cartman's bedroom one night, he seeks refuge with his three surviving stuffed animals at Token Black's house, because, according to Cartman, black people are not subject to criticism or harassment.

Meanwhile, the fifth-graders stage an "83%" protest right next to Butters and Jimmy's 99% protest, proclaiming that as the 83%, they are tired of being punished for the fourth grade class. This begins an argument between the two groups that degenerates into a physical altercation that media characterize as "class warfare".

Despite being at Token's mansion, Cartman discovers Muscle Man Marc melted in a boiling pot of water and Rumper Tumpskin chained to a wall with explosives, which Cartman triggers with a tripwire. He finds the remaining toy, a doll named Polly Prissypants, sitting in an armchair with a revolver, claiming responsibility for all the toy "murders". Polly "explains" that she did this because his friends were right when they said that he needed to grow up. Unbeknownst to him, Cartman's stunned friends watch the bizarre scene unfold from a balcony, as do Cartman's mother and Token's parents from outside a window. Cartman is incredulous that Polly murdered her friends, but Polly explains they were holding her and Cartman back, and that now, with the latter deaths occurring at Token's house, the blame will fall on him, while she and Cartman can grow up together. When Cartman observes that, due to the political climate, black people cannot be blamed for violent crimes, Polly realizes her catastrophic error and convinces Cartman to shoot her to death in order to escape blame himself, leading a tearful Cartman to execute her.

Shocked at what they have just witnessed, Stan asks "what the hell?" Kyle, knowing how psychologically disturbed Cartman is, explains, "We told him to grow up so he got rid of his stuffed animals".

The protests eventually fall apart, as the 99% and 83% are replaced by various smaller percentages, according to a reporter, who then rushes away when he is informed that protestors are now "occupying" a Macaroni Grill.

== Production ==
According to the DVD commentary, the episode was based on cut footage from the season 14 episode "201" in which Cartman holds a tea party with his stuffed animals, and discusses the identity of his father with his mother. The episode included Marc Jacobs as one of Cartman's dolls because Jacobs has a real life tattoo of Cartman's Clyde Frog and Rumpertumskin dolls.

Jacobs commemorated the reference by getting a Marc Jacobs doll tattoo on his arm. He later designed a limited edition Muscleman Marc doll, which was available by June 2012 for a retail price of $125 USD.

== Reception ==
Ryan McGee of The A.V. Club graded the episode an "A−", stating: "What worked in this episode didn't really have much to do with what was funny about it. While there were a few laughs to be had, humor wasn't really the focus. The focus instead lay on the twisted mind of Eric Cartman actually going through a potentially life-changing part of his existence."

Ramsey Isler of IGN gave the episode a "Great" rating of 8 out of 10, noting the "clever bait-and-switch" on the part of Matt Stone and Trey Parker, who indicated in their pre-air press that the episode would parody the Occupy Wall Street movement, only to focus more on Cartman's psychological growth. Though Isler felt it followed past formula for Cartman, he thought it enhanced the episode's theme, lent itself to memorable humor, and found Cartman's maturation, much like the plot of "You're Getting Old", to be surprising and interesting, if not exceptionally funny.

Katia McGlynn of HuffPost, who found the episode's themes funny, praised Parker and Stone for their ability to make a topical episode in only six days, and to use the fourth grade class as a microcosm to parody current events.

Asawin Suebsaeng of Mother Jones stated that despite Parker and Stone's libertarian leanings and their tendency to skewer orthodoxies in general and the political left and right in particular, the episode's "blatant" analogs did not merely target the Occupy Wall Street movement, but what Suebsaeng calls "the whiners, paranoid excuse-makers, and irrational Obama-blamers", as well as overreaction on the part of police and the media, and panic over class warfare. According to Suebsaeng, this underscores Parker and Stone's formula for mining politics for crude, contrarian humor rather than taking it too seriously.

Ken Tucker of Entertainment Weekly did not find the episode particularly funny, owing to what he felt was its uncharacteristically mild obviousness, and the number of different targets of its parody, which he felt rendered the humor mostly aimless and "flimsy".
