= The Poor Kid =

- South Park episode
- Episode no.: Season 15; Episode 14
- Directed by: Trey Parker
- Written by: Trey Parker
- Production code: 1514
- Original air date: November 16, 2011

Guest appearance
- Kiara Lisette Gambao as Melisa Weatherhead

Episode chronology
← Previous "A History Channel Thanksgiving"	Next → "Reverse Cowgirl"
- South Park season 15

"The Poor Kid" is the fifteenth season finale of the American animated television series South Park, and the 223rd episode of the series overall. It first aired on Comedy Central in the United States on November 16, 2011. In the episode, Kenny McCormick and his siblings are sent to a foster home after police discover a meth lab in their house. As a result, Eric Cartman is left with feelings of loss, since he no longer has someone to ridicule for their poverty.

The episode was written by series co-creator Trey Parker and is rated TV-MA LV in the United States. It lampoons Pabst Blue Ribbon, agnosticism, and the Penn State child sex abuse scandal.

== Plot ==
Kenny McCormick's parents Stuart and Carol are arrested for having a meth lab at their home, an event documented on the reality show White Trash in Trouble. As a result, Kenny and his two siblings, Kevin and Karen, are put into the foster care system. Their caseworker, Mr. Adams, who insists on making constant jokes about the Penn State sex abuse scandal, places them with the Weatherheads, a militantly agnostic couple living in Greeley that forbids their numerous foster children from expressing any notions of certainty. Their agnosticism manifests itself in a number of peculiar ways, such as their edict that the children can only drink "agnostic beverages" such as Dr Pepper, because no one can be certain as to what flavor it is, and hypothesizing that God could be "a giant reptilian bird in charge of everything". Because of Karen's sadness and fear over their new living situation, Kenny attempts to protect and comfort her by adopting his superhero persona of Mysterion, whom she comes to see as her guardian angel.

While searching for a new target for his taunts now that Kenny is gone, Eric Cartman is horrified to discover, through Butters Stotch's research, that he is now the poorest student in school. He fears that Kyle Broflovski will start making fun of him now. Despite Kyle's lack of interest in this endeavor, Cartman begins compulsively telling poor jokes about himself to beat Kyle to the punch. When Cartman complains to his mother Liane, she says that she is already working two jobs and cannot do more because of the economy. Wishing he were in a foster home like Kenny, Cartman frames her for running a meth lab, and despite her protests of not having done drugs in a long time, she is arrested, which is again documented by White Trash in Trouble. Despite anticipating being sent to an idyllic setting like Hawaii, Cartman is placed with the Weatherheads and attends the same school in Greeley as Kenny, where he is elated to discover that the poorest student there is not he or Kenny, but a boy named Jacob Hallery, whom Cartman takes delight in ridiculing.

After Kenny, as Mysterion, dispatches a bully who was harassing Karen, she and the other foster kids report what they saw to the Weatherheads, who torture one of the children by hosing him down with Dr Pepper for expressing such certainty. In response to the Weatherheads' cruelty, Cartman reports them to Child Protective Services. Mr. Adams comes to the children's rescue, as does Mysterion, who plants Pabst Blue Ribbon in their refrigerator, on which the Weatherheads get drunk. They are then arrested for being unfit guardians, as documented on White Trash in Trouble. Cartman is also arrested on the show for filing a false police report, and Adams urges the police to return all the foster children to their parents, as the foster care system has been embarrassed. Kenny and Cartman return home, but on their first day back at South Park Elementary, a giant reptilian bird, as Mr. Weatherhead conjectured, rips open the school's roof and eats Kenny. This prompts Cartman to burst into tears and once again tell another poor joke about his mother, as he is once again the poorest child in school.

== Production ==
In the creator commentary for the episode, Trey Parker said they went through several ideas of the foster family, rejecting ideas of sending Kenny to a rich family or a family in it for the money before settling on the "militant agnostics."

This is the first episode where Kenny's siblings (Kevin and Karen) are named.

The episode prominently features the soft drink Dr Pepper, which commentators have noticed is often featured in the show's background.

== Reception ==
Ryan McGhee of The A.V. Club graded the episode a "B−". While he thought the Mysterion-Karen plot gave the episode true pathos, he thought Adams' jokes seemed recycled, and the parody of agnostics were funny but par for the course in terms of South Park's treatment of religion, and not very relevant.

Katie McGlynn of The Huffington Post and Aly Semigram of Entertainment Weekly enjoyed the episode's take on the Penn State child sex abuse scandal, complimenting the show's creators on satirizing the matter without coming across as insensitive, and for mocking not only the scandal, but the manner in which Cartman rebuked the jokes for merely recycling old Catholic jokes.

Lindsey Bahr of SplitSider also thought initially that the Penn State and "Yo mamma" jokes were lacking, and the plot jumpy and convoluted, but then perceived that to be the point of the episode, opining that the final act was "poignant", and the episode the most self-reflective since the mid-season finale.

Johnny Firecloud of CraveOnline gave the episode an 8 out of 10, feeling that it was an improvement over the previous episode "A History Channel Thanksgiving", and said of its treatment of the Penn State matter: "Parker & Stone seem well within their lampooning grounds with this one, without trying to put a larger sociopolitical statement on an issue in which there is very little grey area." Firecloud characterized the episode's closing moments as "solid old-school Kenny death finish. Bravo."

Ramsey Isler of IGN was disappointed that the McCormick siblings' placement in foster care turned out not to be a big turning point for Kenny, but simply another "joke of the week". Isler felt, however, that it was a decent episode with a long string of small but enjoyable gags, in particular those that poked fun at the rote repetition of stale jokes, and the treatment of agnosticism, which he found to be "fresh".

Shirley Galdino of the Secular Humanist League of Brazil welcomed the depiction of the Weatherheads in the episode, saying: "Someone finally satirizes the agnostics for once".
