= Crack Baby Athletic Association =

- South Park episode
- Episode no.: Season 15; Episode 5
- Directed by: Trey Parker
- Written by: Trey Parker
- Production code: 1505
- Original air date: May 25, 2011

Episode chronology
← Previous "T.M.I."	Next → "City Sushi"
- South Park season 15

"Crack Baby Athletic Association" is the fifth episode of the fifteenth season of the American animated television series South Park, and the 214th episode of the series overall, and was written and directed by series co-creator Trey Parker. It premiered in the United States on Comedy Central on May 25, 2011, and was rated TV-MA-L in the United States. "Crack Baby Athletic Association" was nominated for the 2011 Emmy Award for Outstanding Animated Program for Programming Less Than One Hour, but lost to Futurama for the episode "The Late Philip J. Fry". It parodies several films, such as Miracle on 34th Street.

== Plot ==
While watching an episode of Terrance and Phillip, Stan and Kyle see the "saddest commercial ever" presented by Sarah McLachlan about crack babies, Kyle goes to help volunteer at the hospital, but finds Cartman already volunteering there. Suspicious, Kyle follows Cartman and finds that he, Craig, Clyde and Butters have gathered together to form a new business called the "Crack Baby Athletic Association", in which they induce crack-addicted babies to fight each other for a ball filled with crack, with the fights being broadcast on the Internet. Kyle is shocked and horrified at what Cartman has done, but Cartman convinces him it is a win-win situation for everybody and persuades him to work for the business as its accountant, because of his Jewish descent. Kyle repeatedly justifies himself to Stan, who just listens to him in silence.

The business quickly prospers, and the group prepares to cut a deal with EA Sports for a video game based upon their sport. Despite Cartman insisting that they are a nonprofit organization, Kyle tells him that he is uncomfortable with the idea of selling the babies' likenesses to EA Sports while giving them nothing, so Cartman promises to find out how "other companies get away with it". He goes to the athletic department at the University of Colorado dressed as a Southern planter and referring to the university student athletes as "slaves", but gets no advice on how to treat his own "slaves" from the affronted president. Kyle comes up with a plan to compensate the crack babies by spending 30% of the money from the deal on a state-of-the-art orphanage and presents it to Cartman; much to Kyle's surprise, Cartman actually approves of the scheme, due to the public goodwill it will generate. Meanwhile, Clyde and Craig try to get in touch with the guitarist Slash in an attempt to have him perform a halftime show at an upcoming crack baby fight. However, they discover that Slash is actually a make-believe character based on a Dutch legend named "Vunter Slaush", and that the various incarnations of Slash they have encountered are just their parents in costume. This explains why Slash appears to be everywhere at once, even playing a show in Moscow and in Colorado Springs in the same afternoon.

When the deal with EA Sports is signed, the boys learn from their contract with Peter Moore (portrayed here as a bourbon-drinking, cigar-smoking, southern planter), the head of EA Sports, that his company now owns the rights to the Crack Baby Athletic Association and will keep all the revenue. Kyle is crushed over the end of his orphanage project, while Cartman and the others are mostly still in shock about the revelation that Slash does not exist. When they return to South Park, Kyle and Stan discover that the orphanage has been miraculously built. When Kyle asks who paid for it, they see Slash's guitar and hat in the corner. Kyle is overjoyed, and their faith in Slash is restored.

== Reception ==
Ramsey Isler of IGN gave the episode a rating of 7.0 of 10, stating that it was "an average episode – not terribly bad, but not very good either". He criticized the show for its lack of depth regarding the controversy with the NCAA not compensating its players.

Jason Whitlock, a Fox Sports writer and critic of the current state of commercial college athletics and of the NCAA, called the episode "one of the most hilarious and poignant moments of television I’ve ever witnessed", commenting, "It was like The Wire splashed with Arrested Development."

Sean O'Neal of The A.V. Club gave the episode a B+ rating, saying that while the satire was a bit too preachy, the episode was redeemed by the "cartoonishly ludicrous" notion of Slash as a Santa Claus figure.

The morning after the episode aired, Slash tweeted "I'm not......real?" followed by a sad emoticon.
