= Ass Burgers =

- South Park episode
- Episode no.: Season 15; Episode 8
- Directed by: Trey Parker
- Written by: Trey Parker
- Production code: 1508
- Original air date: October 5, 2011

Episode chronology
← Previous "You're Getting Old"	Next → "The Last of the Meheecans"
- South Park season 15

"Ass Burgers" is the eighth episode of South Park's fifteenth season and the 217th episode of the series overall. It first aired in the U.S. on October 5, 2011, on Comedy Central. The episode picks up where the previous episode, "You're Getting Old", left off. Stan's cynicism is mistakenly blamed on his recent vaccinations and diagnosed with Asperger syndrome, a criticism of anti-vaccination proponents. Cartman mishears the condition as "ass burgers" and opens a food stand in which the secret ingredient involves stuffing his underwear with hamburgers. The episode is rated TV-MA-L in the United States.

Trey Parker and Matt Stone considered alternative storylines, but decided it would be best if the show "reset" back to normal. They both noted that doing the opposite would have put too much emphasis on drama, rather than comedy. The writers had the idea to center an episode on the "Ass Burgers" pun for several years, but did not think discussion and awareness of the disorder had entered pop culture to the extent that enough people would understand the joke.

The episode received mixed reviews from television critics, who either praised the show's return to form or criticized it for becoming formulaic. In its original American broadcast, "Ass Burgers" was watched by 2.941 million viewers, according to Nielsen Media Research. "Ass Burgers" was released on DVD and Blu-ray along with the rest of the fifteenth season on March 27, 2012.

== Plot ==
Following the events of the previous episode, Stan is attempting to adapt to his parents' divorce while his cynicism causes him to explode in class out of frustration. Stan's depression is diagnosed as Asperger syndrome because he received a flu vaccination a year earlier, although the veracity of this claim is uncertain. Taken to an Asperger's Group Therapy Center, Stan is greeted by a doctor who introduces him to the other patients, all exhibiting an assortment of odd behaviors. When left alone, however, all the people quickly drop their act, and the false doctor reveals that not only do none of those present have the condition, they do not even believe that it exists. Stan learns that the center is actually a front for cynical self-perceived freedom fighters who believe that the world really has turned into feces, and that some kind of supernatural force is preventing the rest of the world from noticing. The leader, who is a parody of Morpheus from The Matrix, gives Stan a glass of Jameson Irish Whiskey as a "serum" so he can interact with the "illusion world", and charges him with convincing others to see the world as they do. While drunk, he cheerfully embraces the world and enjoys a screening of Jack and Jill.

As this occurs, Cartman, upon mishearing the condition as "ass burgers", attempts to fake this condition at school by stuffing his underwear with hamburgers. Although this fails, Cartman gives one of the hamburgers to Kyle, who declares them delicious without knowing that Cartman had them in his underwear. This inspires Cartman to start a food stand with Kyle called Cartman Burger, at which he will sell hamburgers that had their flavor enhanced by being placed inside his underwear. While intoxicated, Stan unsuccessfully attempts to make amends with Kyle, who explains that things have irreversibly changed and he must remain with Cartman Burger. The next day, Stan is sent armed to a secret meeting being attended by corporate representatives of America's most popular fast-food chains, which have lost business due to the popularity of Cartman Burger. The representatives deduce that Cartman Burgers contain ingredients from all of their products, which are infused into Cartman Burgers via some type of gas. When Stan arrives and loses consciousness from the alcohol, the restaurant agents tie him up and interrogate him about the secret ingredient.

As Stan does not know the ingredient, the representatives subsequently monitor a conversation between him and Kyle over the ingredient, but when Kyle tells Stan that only Cartman knows the secret ingredient, the restaurant agents storm the stand before the severely drunk freedom fighters arrive and gun them down. Stan, however, refuses to drink any more whiskey, and realizes that although he may no longer be with both of his parents and Kyle is no longer his best friend, he is now excited by the prospect of change rather than scared of it, claiming this could be the start of new, original adventures for everybody. However, Randy appears and announces that he and Sharon have worked out their differences and are reconciling. This surprises and upsets Stan, and he relapses into depression as, in a montage, which is once again set to Fleetwood Mac's song "Landslide", everything returns to normal. The Marshes move back into their home together, Stan reconciles with his girlfriend Wendy, and Kyle breaks off his friendship with Cartman and gets Cartman Burger shut down after finding out what the secret ingredient is.

After Stan wakes up on a subsequent morning, Kyle, Kenny, and Cartman appear in his bedroom and invite him to the movies with them. Resigned to his fate, Stan reluctantly joins them, taking a swig of whiskey on his way out.

== Production ==
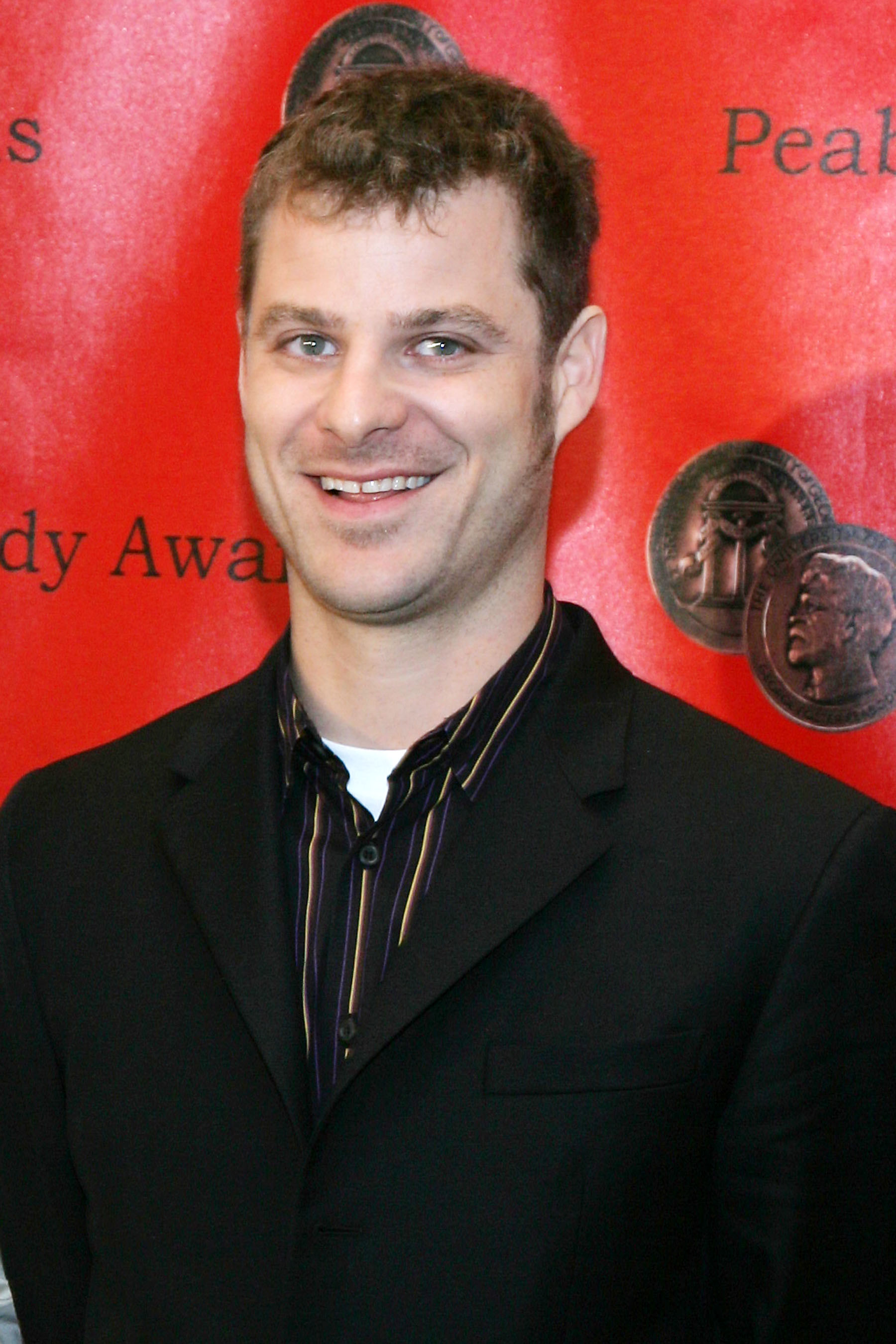
Co-creator Matt Stone felt the show returning to normality would be unsatisfying story-wise, but felt the ending of the episode made up for it.

"Ass Burgers" is the mid-season premiere of South Park's fifteenth season and the first episode of the show's fall 2011 run. During the summer, co-creators Trey Parker and Matt Stone had won nine Tony Awards for their work on the Broadway musical The Book of Mormon. To dissuade any critics from believing their newfound acclaim on the Great White Way would somehow make South Park more mature, they titled the episode "Ass Burgers", a pun on Asperger syndrome. They had the idea to center an episode of the disorder's name several years prior, but it had not entered the pop culture consciousness in a way that Parker and Stone felt enough people would be aware of the joke.

It is the conclusion of a two-parter begun with "You're Getting Old", the mid-season finale that involved Stan turning ten years old and beginning to view the world through a cynical lens. In addition, his parents separate, and the episode ends with a montage set to Fleetwood Mac's "Landslide", in which both situations end unresolved. The episode's abrupt and downbeat ending provoked media coverage following its broadcast, with some critics believing it to be a comment on the show's long run and its creators exhaustion with producing episodes. They wrote the episode without a conclusion in mind, resolving to figure it out upon their return to producing episodes in the fall. The first pieces of animation completed for the episode were its opening scenes, in which normal South Park events are played out while Stan stands depressed. Parker summarized the tone of the first writers' meetings when they resumed production: "Now what the hell do we do?"

One idea suggested was that Stan's parents remained separated and the show continues as normal; Parker and Stone rejected it as it would involve less Randy, one of their favorite characters on the show. Another idea would have involved Stan attempting to get his parents back together throughout the course of the second half of the season, in a serialized fashion. As they continued pitching ideas, the duo found themselves more focused on the drama of the situation, rather than the comedy. Finding themselves constantly stuck on ideas, they decided there was no choice but to "reset" and make everything normal again. Parker noted that South Park, throughout its run, has been a cartoon comedy and he believed it should stay that way. One idea suggested made the idea of resetting sad; staff writer Vernon Chatman suggested playing "Landslide" again as things return to normal.

Stone later commented that although there was no choice, he disliked the idea of returning things to normal, as he felt viewers had made an emotional connection to "You're Getting Old" and simply "resetting" would be unsatisfying, story-wise. He felt as though the ending of the episode — in which Stan decides to accept that things are now different, only to be followed by everything returning to normal — was an acceptable conclusion, considering how it appears to trump traditional sitcom conventions, only to embrace them moments later.

== Reception ==
In its original American broadcast on October 5, 2011, "Ass Burgers" was watched by 2.941 million viewers, according to Nielsen Media Research.

Ryan McGee of The A.V. Club graded the episode a B+, stating, "We may end up down the road far from where we started, only to realize we moved so incrementally that we didn’t notice along the way. Hopefully, the show’s ability to combine puerile humor with sharp social commentary doesn’t disappear, whatever road it takes." Ramsey Isler of IGN felt differently, writing that "While some will surely see this as a good sign ("if it ain't broke, don't try to fix it"), I feel like this was a missed opportunity to propel the series forward. The show had fallen into a rut and become formulaic, and just when 'You're Getting Old' gave us a hint that Trey and Matt were sick of their own antics and ready to usher in a new era of exciting changes, the boldest guys in the biz appear to be going back to what's safe and comfortable and familiar."
