= Funnybot =

- South Park episode
- Episode no.: Season 15; Episode 2
- Directed by: Trey Parker
- Written by: Trey Parker
- Production code: 1502
- Original air date: May 4, 2011

Episode chronology
← Previous "HumancentiPad"	Next → "Royal Pudding"
- South Park season 15

"Funnybot" is the second episode of the fifteenth season of the American animated television series South Park, and the 211th episode of the series overall. "Funnybot" premiered in the United States on Comedy Central on May 4, 2011, the first time a South Park episode has premiered in May since season 10's "Tsst" in 2006. "Funnybot" was written and directed by series co-creator Trey Parker and was rated TV-MA in the United States.

"Funnybot" is a parody of The Comedy Awards, black comedian Tyler Perry, the Star Trek episode "The Changeling", the Daleks from Doctor Who, the death of Osama bin Laden, and foreign perception of German humor.

== Plot ==
Jimmy hosts South Park Elementary's first annual comedy awards show. Among the awards given are the award for Most Unfunny People, which goes to the Germans, and the Kathy Griffin Award, given for the celebrity most likely to show up and receive it, which goes to Tyler Perry. The only person to laugh at Perry is Token, who appears upset with himself after realizing that no one else finds Perry funny. When the Germans find out that they have been voted Most Unfunny People, they are furious and the next day German chancellor Angela Merkel, German president Christian Wulff and the rest of the German government attack South Park Elementary. They take the students hostage and unveil a robot called the XJ-212 Funnybot, in an attempt to show the students that Germans are funny. Funnybot tells jokes in a robotic tone, punctuated by the punch line "Awkward!"

Funnybot takes the comedy world by storm, becoming ubiquitous in all kinds of media. This distresses a number of famous human comedians, such as Adam Sandler and Jay Leno, who fear for their livelihoods. The comedians decide to storm South Park Elementary, demanding that the students stop Funnybot. Jimmy, Stan, Cartman and Kyle take up the task, but it is complicated by Funnybot's increasingly sinister behavior. During a stand-up performance, Funnybot reveals that his body houses two rotary cannons, which he then proceeds to fire into the audience, resulting in numerous deaths.

The boys manage to gain access to Funnybot, only to discover that he plans to destroy the world as the ultimate joke. Funnybot connects to the defense mainframes of both the United States and Russia, arming the nuclear missiles of both countries. The boys are unable to disconnect Funnybot due to a defensive field surrounding him. However, Kyle remembers that robots can be confused by a logical paradox, which inspires Jimmy to present Funnybot with a comedy award. This confounds Funnybot's programming, since one who accepts an award for being funny is clearly taking themselves and comedy seriously, which is not funny. The loop ultimately overwhelms Funnybot's circuits, deactivating it.

Afterwards, the action moves to a junkyard, where the Germans, the boys, the comedians, and President Barack Obama overlook a massive hole. The boys push a wooden crate onto a platform, where it is encased inside three massive metallic shells and dropped into the large hole, which is filled with concrete. Funnybot then appears, stating that he now knows that comedy is meant to be performed by humans. A noise is heard from the concrete-filled hole, and it is revealed to be Tyler Perry, buried in the ground. Jimmy admits that he has learned his lesson and promises that there will not be a comedy awards show next year, and Cartman ends the episode by saying "Or will there be?", breaking the fourth wall.

== Cultural references ==
The first act of the episode parodies The Comedy Awards. Funnybot shares several characteristics with the Daleks, a villain species from the long-running BBC television series Doctor Who.

A variety of references are made to the death of Osama bin Laden, which occurred three days prior to the airing of the episode. President Barack Obama is shown giving a speech addressing Funnybot's attempt to destroy humanity in the same location in which he gave his address concerning bin Laden, and much of the speech in the episode is lifted word-for-word from the real address. Bin Laden is further referenced at the conclusion of the episode, where President Obama states "I am pleased to announce the greatest threat to mankind is gone forever." The "greatest threat" that Obama is referencing is Tyler Perry, who was buried alive.

When the boys attempt to stop Funnybot at the television studio, a poster titled One and a Half Men can be seen in the hallway, mocking Charlie Sheen's departure from the show.

== Reception ==
=== Ratings ===
In its original American broadcast on May 4, 2011, "Funnybot" was seen by 2.591 million viewers, according to Nielsen Media Research. It finished third in overall viewers, yet tied for first with a 1.8 rating in the critical 18–49 age demographic. This represents an audience drop of roughly 17% from the season fifteen premiere "HUMANCENTiPAD", which drew 3.108 million viewers, and compares negatively to the second episode of season fourteen, "The Tale of Scrotie McBoogerballs", which drew 3.24 million viewers.

=== Reviews ===
IGN gave the episode a 6.5/10 rating, stating "this episode could really be summed up in three words: not very good."

TV Fanatic, while praising the ability of the show to stay with current events, awarded the episode a mixed review of 3.5 out of 5, noting "it wasn't the strongest episode of the show's history."

The A.V. Club agreed, giving the episode a tepid C+, noting that "'Funnybot' was a bit too 'NON-SEQUITUR' for me, sticking to easy jokes about easy targets and then—like Funnybot himself—padding out its kernel of an idea with random nonsense that left the whole thing feeling a little slight."

While praising the episode's central concept, Assignment X nevertheless concluded that Funnybot had "a good idea that strangely doesn't deliver on the funny."

Positive reviews focused mainly on the show's ability to quickly incorporate current events into its episodes. Entertainment Weekly noted "One of the most fun parts about watching South Park is slowly piecing together its seemingly inane and ridiculous plot points and realizing that its creators are actually delivering a well-thought-out and relevant statement." The Wall Street Journal echoed this sentiment, claiming the episode was "an impressive example of speedily manufactured humor."
