= T.M.I. (South Park) =

- South Park episode
- Episode no.: Season 15; Episode 4
- Directed by: Trey Parker
- Written by: Trey Parker
- Production code: 1504
- Original air date: May 18, 2011

Episode chronology
| ← Previous "Royal Pudding" | Next → "Crack Baby Athletic Association" |
- South Park season 15

"T.M.I." is the fourth episode of the fifteenth season of the American animated television series South Park, and the 213th episode of the series overall. "T.M.I." premiered in the United States on Comedy Central on May 18, 2011. The episode centers on Eric Cartman being sent to an anger management class after he protests what he mistakenly believes to be the school's publicizing the male students' penis sizes. "T.M.I." was written and directed by series co-creator Trey Parker, and was rated TV-MA-L in the United States.

== Plot ==
At South Park Elementary, an enraged Cartman has a meltdown in the cafeteria, swearing over the publicly posted results of the students' annual school physicals, which document how much each student has grown in height, mistakenly understanding them to be a list of all the boys' penis sizes. Embarrassed because his number is the smallest, and shorter than his real length, he organizes the measurement all of his male schoolmates' penises and posts his own findings in the hall. He is then called to Principal Victoria's office, who explains that the first list actually documented height differentials. To make matters worse, Cartman has found that his penis really is the smallest of all the boys in the school. Principal Victoria observes that Cartman's habit of overreacting, and his tendency to be quick to anger, has often led to such situations, and this time, he did this to himself. She refers him to a consultation session with a psychiatrist, who tests him to see how he deals with anger. While the psychiatrist tries to incite him into anger with insults about his obesity, Cartman calmly sends some text messages. The psychiatrist then receives a phone call from his wife, who informs him that she just received a text from someone named Mitch Conner, implicating him in an affair with a 14-year-old girl, before committing suicide by gunshot while on the phone. Cartman then menacingly replies to the psychiatrist, "I'm not fat; I'm big-boned."

Soon after, Cartman is sent to an anger management class, which he shares with a number of other people, such as Daniel, Chase, Tuong Lu Kim, Michael the tall Goth, a butch lesbian shemale named Gretchen and a member of the Tea Party movement. It soon becomes apparent that every person in the class has issues with their penis size (even the masculine female of the group). Meanwhile, Randy Marsh gives a talk to the fourth grade class about human sexual behavior, presenting a ridiculously complicated formula for calculating "adjusted penis size" — or "T.M.I." — that transforms his below average penis length to above average. Soon afterward, the Surgeon General of the United States delivers her own talk to correct Randy's inaccurate information, presenting the government's official but equally bizarre T.M.I. formula that prompts Randy to beat her up in front of the class. This results in his attending Cartman's anger management class, where the two of them incite the group to riot against the federal government.

They take over a FedEx shipping center, mistakenly believing it to be a government office, Randy names their group the "Pissed Off and Angry Party" and presents their demands to a national television audience: the resignation of the Surgeon General, Obama's birth certificate, "moms to stop trippin'", and to "fuck Kyle Broflovski". The movement spreads around the country, with other FedEx locations being taken over. Even Butters joins in when his T.M.I. falls in the smaller range. In response, Cartman's psychiatrist develops a theory that the true source of everyone's anger is their embarrassment over their very small penis size. After he informs the Surgeon General, she addresses the nation on TV. She says that although the government's formula for calculating T.M.I. is accurate, the national "average" value has been re-defined downward to 1.5 inches (3.8 cm). The violent movement instantly breaks up, since every man involved now falls into the "above average" range—except for Cartman, whose penis remains under the new average. Cartman's frustrated remarks are dismissed by the Pissed Off and Angry Party's former members as they proclaim that "America is back!"

== Reception ==
In its original American broadcast on May 18, 2011, "T.M.I." was seen by 2.415 million viewers, according to Nielsen Media Research.

The A.V. Club, IGN, and Assignment X all gave "T.M.I." generally positive reviews. Sean O'Neal of The A.V. Club rated the episode A− and praised it as a character-based episode "that managed to turn the minute, ridiculous happenings in a small Colorado town into a microcosm of what's going on in the country." Ramsey Iser of IGN called "T.M.I." "a solid episode with plenty to like" but not "top of the line South Park material", giving a rating of 8 out of 10. Carl Cortez of Assignment X wrote that "T.M.I." was "not perfect, but good", and compared it favorably with the two preceding episodes. He praised it for its simplicity and "the inspired lunacy that makes South Park so great".
