= Royal Pudding =

- South Park episode
- Episode no.: Season 15; Episode 3
- Directed by: Trey Parker
- Written by: Trey Parker
- Production code: 1503
- Original air date: May 11, 2011

Episode chronology
← Previous "Funnybot"	Next → "T.M.I."
- South Park season 15

"Royal Pudding" is the third episode of the fifteenth season of the American animated television series South Park and 212th episode of the series overall. "Royal Pudding" premiered in the United States on Comedy Central on May 11, 2011. In the episode, which parodies the 2011 wedding of Prince William and Catherine Middleton, the Prince of Canada's bride is abducted at the altar, leading Ike Broflovski to answer the call to rescue her. "Royal Pudding" was written and directed by series co-creator Trey Parker and was rated TV-MA L in the United States and Canada. The episode aired twelve days after the wedding.

== Plot ==
Mr. Mackey is making the kindergarten students perform a play about tooth decay and the importance of dental hygiene. He is looks outraged when Ike Broflovski, who is supposed to portray tooth decay, misses a rehearsal to watch the Canadian royal wedding. During the ceremony, the princess is suddenly enclosed in a giant cube and spirited away. Ike is so sad that he cannot stop crying during rehearsal and gets sent home by Mr. Mackey. People all over Canada commit mass suicide of despair for the princess' abduction and a candlelight vigil is held where Rush performs a version of "Candle in the Wind." The Prime Minister of Canada instructs all people of Canadian descent to go home and open their "Box of Faith", which contains – along with a location beacon, a first aid kit, and a sandwich – a video recording issuing a call to arms for all Canadians in fighting condition to "meet by the tree in Edmonton". Ike answers the call and, while riding a bus to Canada, meets a fellow Canadian named Ugly Bob: a former actor for the Terrance and Phillip Show who has immigrated to America. Bob claims he must wear a bag over his head because, even though he simply appears Canadian to Americans, other Canadians find his face frighteningly ugly.

Once the pair arrive, the first instinct of the member of the Canadian Armed Forces leading the gathered Canadians is that the princess was taken by a giant, who turns out to be Scott the Dick, who grew to seven feet tall – giant by Canadian standards – after a radioactive accident in Ottawa. When it turns out that Scott has been wrongly accused of taking the princess, most other Canadians go home, but Scott persuades Ike and Ugly Bob to follow him as he accuses the Inuit of kidnapping the princess out of his racial prejudice towards the "Native Canadians". The three of them travel to the Arctic tundra of the Yukon Territory to get information from the Inuit, who admit that their people do have a grudge against the Canadians for taking their land, but tribe leader reveals that the princess' abduction was foretold, and that the true kidnapper is one who attacks people of all nationalities. Throughout their journey, Scott espouses a variety of racist remarks towards the "Native Canadians", such as referring them to "polar gooks" and "ice beaners", and claims he once paid an Inuk to perform oral sex on him but she simply "[rubbed] her nose against [his] penis for 45 seconds and asked [him] to pay her!" much to Ike's annoyance. With an Inuk mother leading the three, they find a large dark castle, where the princess is held captive by the abductor: Tooth Decay. Eventually, after the monster hurls Scott and the Inuk woman across the room, Ike turns Tooth Decay to stone by exposing Ugly Bob's face to him.

Meanwhile, Mr. Mackey becomes increasingly irate with Ike's absence and blames the lackluster performance of the school play on Kyle Broflovski, who has been filling Ike's role in his absence. During rehearsals Mackey consistently loses his temper with the children for singing flat or without feeling, directing his most scathing remarks at Kyle, and reveals that the play means a great deal to him: as Tooth Decay killed his father. While the play is a success with parents of the kindergartners, Mr. Mackey verbally abuses his actors' imperfections backstage until the police intervene, telling Mackey to cancel the play: as Tooth Decay has been killed. Ike receives a knighthood from the Canadian princess, an honor that fails to impress any of the boys (with the exception of Kyle), and the royal wedding begins again. Both events (before and after the princess' abduction) involve bizarre traditions such as the prince putting his arms into a large bowl of butterscotch pudding, the princess scraping them clean and smearing the pudding on her own face, and the prince tearing one of her arms off and inserting it into his anus, "as is tradition."

== Production ==
According to the DVD commentary, series creators Matt Stone and Trey Parker found both the royal wedding and the hype surrounding it to be peculiar, stating, "Whenever we talk about something no-one cares about we make it about Canada." The kindergarten play rehearsals were based on the rehearsals for The Book of Mormon. The voices for the "native Canadians" were provided by Native Americans.

== Reception ==
In its original American broadcast on May 11, 2011, "Royal Pudding" was seen by 2.435 million viewers, according to Nielsen Media Research.

Sean O'Neal, reviewing the episode for The A.V. Club, gave the episode a "C−", citing its "bric-a-brac construction", and calling it "one of the strangest half-hours in the show's history". O'Neal deemed the episode "pointedly silly", "polarizing", and "bound to be divisive".

IGN's Ramsay Isler gave the episode a rating of 5.5 out of 10, calling it "disappointing", and saying, "It has been said that episodes without Cartman are often the worst, and that's certainly the case here." Isler felt that while the Canadian traditions depicted in the beginning of the episode provided some humor, it quickly wore out, that the rest of the episode was "rather boring", and that the bit with the severed arm at the end of the episode was ridiculous without being funny.

== See also ==
- Monarchy of Canada § In popular culture
