= Crème fraîche (disambiguation) =

Crème fraîche is a soured cream. It may also refer to:

- Creme Fraiche (horse), an American Thoroughbred racehorse
- "Crème Fraîche" (South Park), the 14th episode and season finale of the fourteenth season of American animated television series South Park
