= HumancentiPad =

- South Park episode
- Kyle as part of the HumancentiPad
- Episode no.: Season 15; Episode 1
- Directed by: Trey Parker
- Written by: Trey Parker
- Production code: 1501
- Original air date: April 27, 2011

Episode chronology
← Previous "Crème Fraîche"	Next → "Funnybot"
- South Park season 15

"HumancentiPad", stylized as "HUMANCENTiPAD" (pronounced /ˌhjuːmənˈsɛntaɪˌpæd/), is the first episode of the fifteenth season of the American animated television series South Park, and the 210th episode of the series overall. It originally aired on Comedy Central in the United States on April 27, 2011. In the episode, Kyle is kidnapped after agreeing to an iTunes user agreement, and forced to become part of a "revolutionary new product" that is about to be launched by Apple. Meanwhile, Cartman, who has not acquired an Apple iPad, pesters his mother on the issue, drawing her ire.

The episode was written and directed by series co-creator Trey Parker, and was rated TV-MA-L in the United States. The episode's title, and main plot, refers to the 2009 film The Human Centipede (First Sequence). This episode parodies reports about tracking software built into iPads and iPhones, and tediously long end-user license agreements.

The making of the episode was the subject of the TV special, 6 Days to Air, which aired on Comedy Central on October 9, 2011.

== Plot ==
After Eric Cartman boasts to his classmates of owning an iPad and mocks them for not having one, he is humiliated when it is revealed that he actually does not own one. When he and his mother Liane go to Best Buy to buy an iPad, the item's exorbitant price prompts her to suggest buying a less expensive Toshiba HandiBook. The demanding Cartman, who had his mind set on the iPad as a status symbol, loudly excoriates her in the middle of the store, accusing her of "fucking" him and mooning in front of her and the people in the store. Humiliated, Liane leaves the store without buying him anything. Cartman tries to manipulate and act innocently to his mother, but she doesn't fall for it.

Meanwhile, Cartman's classmate and frequent nemesis Kyle Broflovski, who did not read the Terms and Conditions when agreeing to download the latest iTunes update, is pursued by shadowy agents from Apple Inc., who wish to perform several intrusive acts upon him, informing him that he agreed to them when he downloaded the update. Kyle attempts to flee the men and is incredulous when his friends tell him they all read the entire Terms and Conditions when they downloaded the latest update. Kyle seeks refuge at his father Gerald's law office. Still, the Apple agents taser Gerald, kidnap Kyle, and throw him in a cage with a Japanese man named Junichi Takiyama and a young woman who also failed to read the fine print of their purchased updates.

At a Stevenote address, Steve Jobs unveils the new product for which Kyle and the other two were kidnapped: the HUMANCENTiPAD, comprising the three kidnapped subjects on all fours and sewn together mouth to anus. Junichi Takiyama is in front, with an iPhone attached to his forehead; Kyle is in the middle; and the woman is at the rear, with an iPad attached to her anus. However, Jobs is disappointed when Kyle continues to sign agreements that are put in front of him without reading them first, and puts the "device" through tests in an attempt to make it read.

Meanwhile, Cartman appears on the talk show Dr. Phil to publicly accuse Liane of "fucking" him. The audience misunderstands this to mean that she has sexually molested him. Cartman is given the first-ever HUMANCENTiPAD as Jobs unveils it to the public as a consolation gift. Cartman is elated to have a device that not only supports web browsing and email but also enables him to induce someone to defecate into Kyle's mouth.

Seeking to free his son, Gerald goes with Kyle's friends Stan, Kenny and Butters to an Apple Store, where the customer service agents known as "the Geniuses", after considerable deliberations, determine that they can void Kyle's agreement if Gerald, a PC user, signs up with Apple and creates a family account. Gerald consents, after which he, the Geniuses, and Kyle's friends go to the studio where Dr. Phil is produced. Jobs, complying with Gerald's new deal, reluctantly makes preparations to have Kyle separated from his two fellow victims. This enrages Cartman, whose dream is now being quashed. Cartman looks up to the heavens and angrily excoriates God, after which he is struck by a bolt of lightning. He is then shown recuperating in a hospital bed, crying while his mother flips through a book indifferently after what he did against her.

== Reception ==
In its original American broadcast on April 27, 2011, "HUMANCENTiPAD" was watched by 3.108 million viewers, according to Nielsen Media Research.

Reviewing the episode for Entertainment Weekly, Ken Tucker called the episode "scabrously funny" and summed up its message as "[k]nowledge really matters; many people are lazy, and consequently become prey to exploitation". Ramsey Isler of IGN rated the episode 7.5 out of 10. He said the episode was "a decent opening" for the season, but criticized it for overuse of Cartman's accusations against his mother, generic jokes about Apple's "Geniuses", and "poop jokes ... [that] didn't do much for the story or the comedy".
