= Peter Moore (businessman) =

British-American business executive (born 1955)

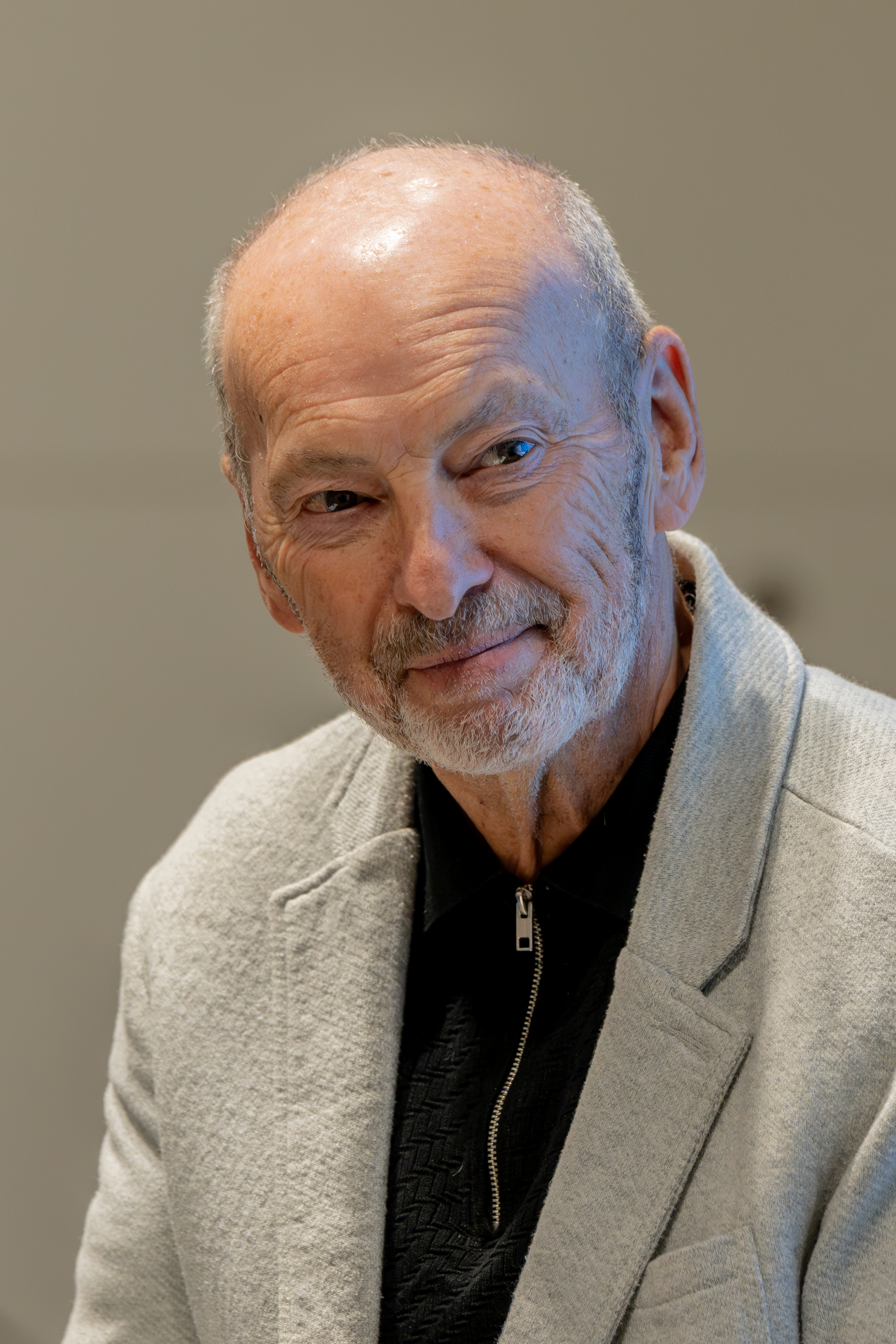
- Moore in 2025
- Born: 1955 (age 70–71); Liverpool, England
- Citizenship: United Kingdom; United States
- Education: Keele University; California State University, Long Beach
- Employer: Unity Technologies
- Known for: Career at Sega, Microsoft and Electronic Arts

Peter Moore (born 1955) is a British-American business executive. He is known for his former positions as senior VP of Global Sports Marketing at Reebok, president of Sega of America, and corporate vice-president of Microsoft's Interactive Entertainment Business division, overseeing the Xbox and Xbox 360 game consoles. From 2007 to 2011, he was head of Electronic Arts' EA Sports game division. In 2012, Moore was appointed COO of Electronic Arts. He resigned from EA in February 2017 to become CEO of Liverpool Football Club. It was announced in July 2020 that Moore would be leaving Liverpool at the end of August that year, having completed his three-year tenure with the club. In December 2024, he became member of the board of directors of Nomadar, a NASDAQ company listed with the symbol NOMA. On 6 July 2025, he became a board advisor and a minority shareholder of Polish football club Wisła Kraków.

== Life and career ==
The eldest of four siblings, Moore was born in Liverpool to a dock worker and a children's hospital nurse.

He holds a bachelor's degree from Keele University and a master's degree from California State University, Long Beach.

He worked for Patrick USA, the US subsidiary of a French sportswear company, and then at Reebok for almost a decade. He was a physical education teacher in Llangollen for a number of years.

Moore recently became a resident of Montecito, California, United States.

== Sega ==
After Reebok, Moore was hired by Bernie Stolar to work at Sega of America. Despite his son owning a Sega Saturn, Moore knew little about video games. However, he quickly rose to prominence at Sega, and was a prominent figure in the company's North American operations during the Dreamcast era. On 11 August, Sega of America confirmed that Stolar had been fired, leaving Moore to direct the launch. He became the president and chief operating officer of Sega of America on 8 May 2000.

Moore clashed with Japanese leadership. He commissioned a focus group of young American adults in late 2001 or early 2002 to get a sense of how they viewed different gaming companies. The group revealed troubling opinions about Sega. Moore presented a subtitled tape to Sega leadership in Tokyo, and later recalled Yuji Naka accusing him of lying and forcing focus group attendees to criticize Sega. Moore asked his interpreter to tell Naka to "fuck off" and resigned from Sega in January 2003.

Moore portrayed a zombie in the 2003 film adaptation of House of the Dead along with the producer of the original game, Rikiya Nakagawa.

== Microsoft ==
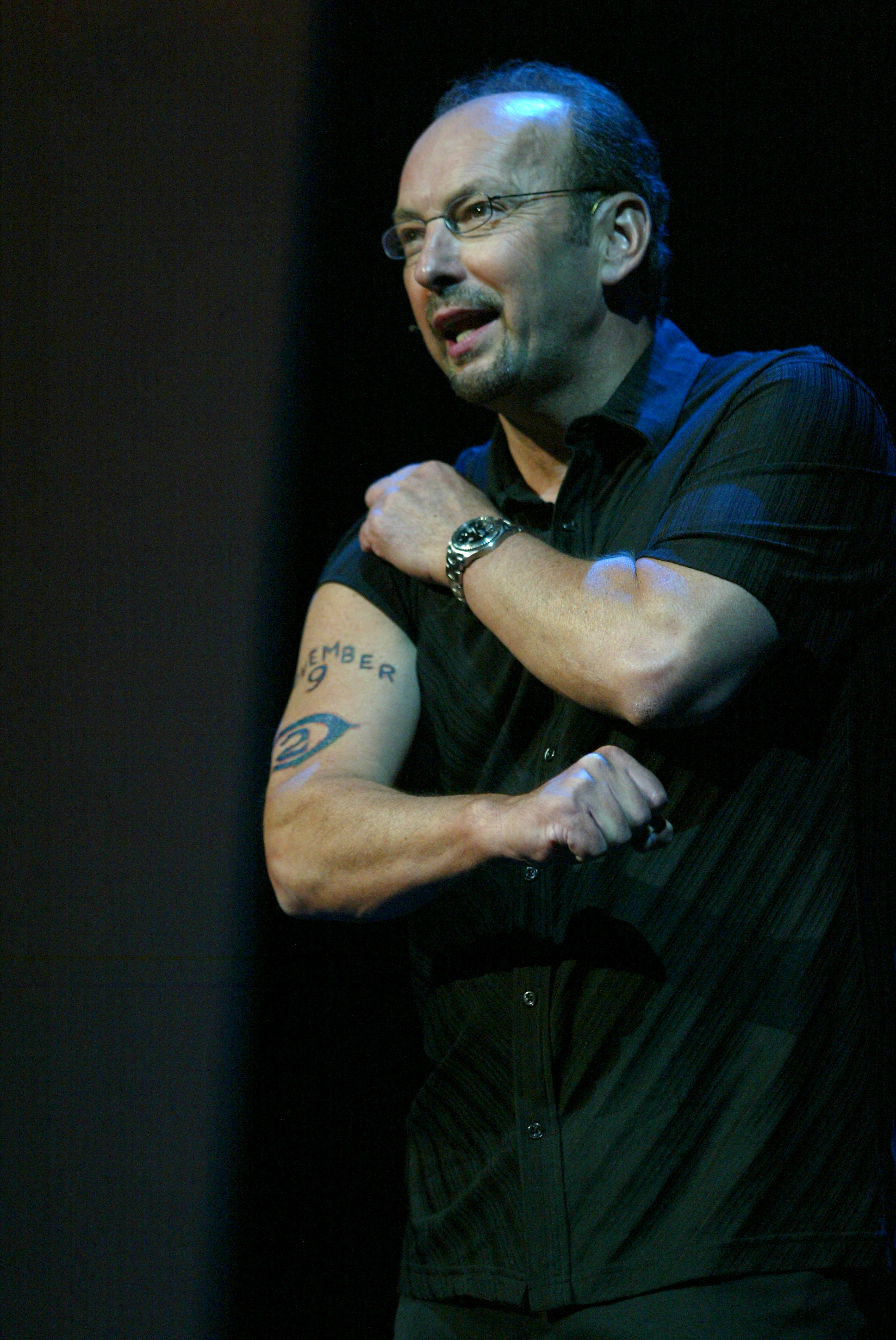
Moore presenting at the 2004 Xbox conference, Shrine Auditorium, Los Angeles

On 20 January 2003, Microsoft hired Moore to help the Xbox console compete with Sony's PlayStation 2 and Nintendo's GameCube. At Microsoft, Moore gained notoriety for displaying tattoos of Halo 2 and Grand Theft Auto IV that he used when announcing the respective games (the former was used to announce Halo 2's release date of 9 November 2004, while the latter was used to announce Grand Theft Auto IV). Some sources claim that the Halo 2 tattoo was not permanent, while others have reported that Moore still has it.

Moore also reportedly endorsed the Wii console as an alternative over the PlayStation 3, claiming that for the price of one PlayStation 3 (US$599 at the time), the consumer could buy both the Xbox 360 and Wii.

== Electronic Arts ==
On 17 July 2007, Electronic Arts announced that Moore would be leaving Microsoft to head the sports division at Electronic Arts. He reportedly wanted to move back to the San Francisco Bay area to live with his family, which was possible with EA. His position as vice president of Interactive Entertainment Business at Microsoft was filled by Don Mattrick (who later also left Microsoft to join Zynga as CEO).

Moore was parodied in an episode of South Park, Season 15's "Crack Baby Athletic Association", focusing on the NCAA's relationship with Electronic Arts.

On 4 August 2011, Moore was promoted from EA Sports president to chief operating officer in a structure reshuffle.

In an interview with the game press on 20 June 2012, Moore predicted the radical shift of the gaming industry's business model towards free-to-play, saying he believed within 10 years the industry would shift to that model entirely. Under his leadership, games such as Star Wars: The Old Republic and Command & Conquer: Generals 2 changed focus from a single-player campaign game to a free-to-play multiplayer game with microtransactions.

On 10 December 2015, Moore was appointed as the "chief competition officer" of EA's newly formed competitive gaming division.

== Liverpool FC ==
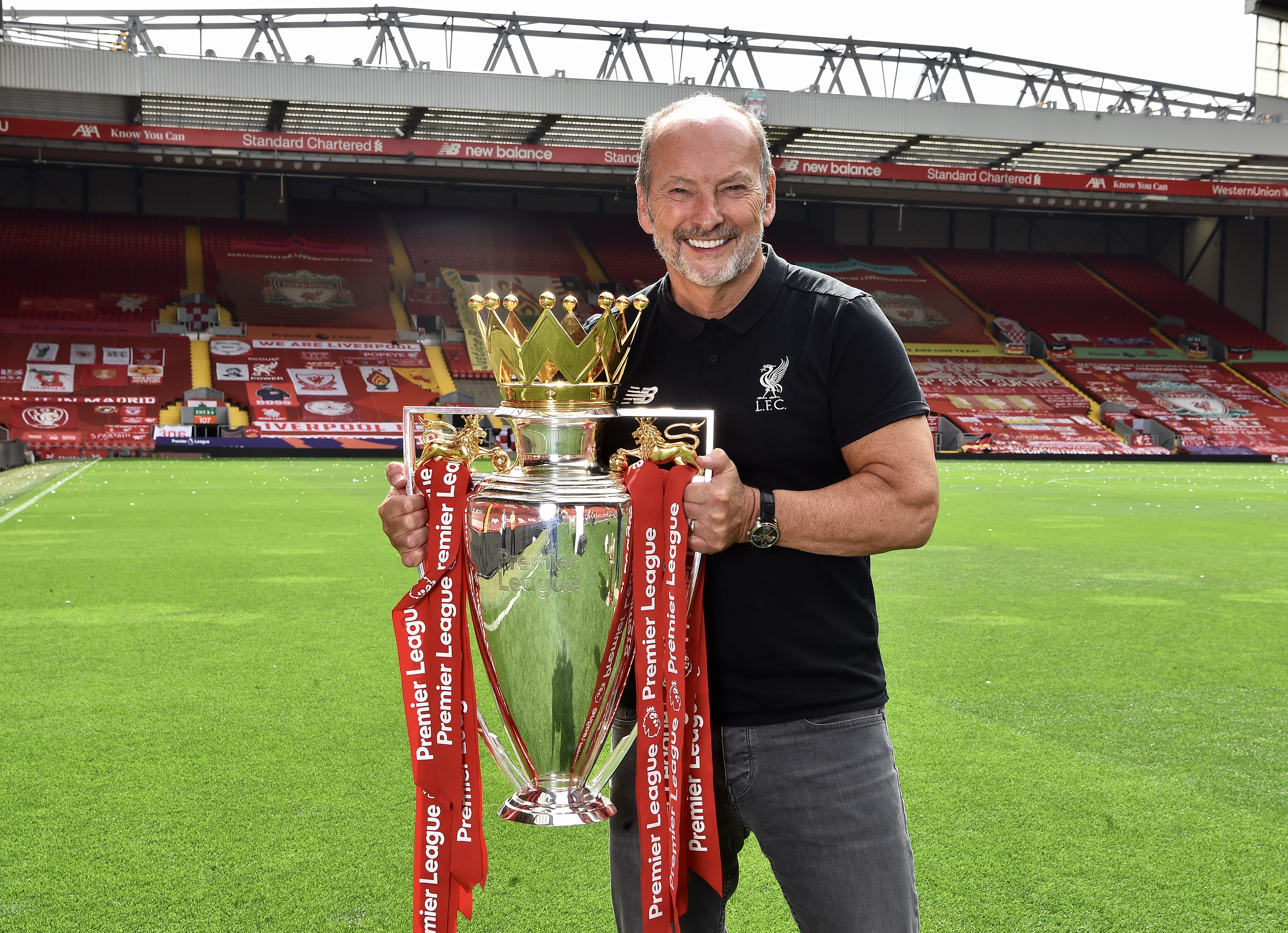
Moore and the Premier League trophy

Moore left EA and was announced as the new CEO of the Liverpool Football Club on 27 February 2017. He took up the new role, which included running the business of the club, on 1 June 2017, and reported directly to the club's owners, Fenway Sports Group. During his tenure with the club, they won the UEFA Champions League, the FIFA Club World Cup and the Premier League. Moore was also named Premier League CEO of the Year in 2019. Moore stepped down as CEO at the end of August 2020, with Billy Hogan stepping up from his role as the club's managing director and chief commercial officer.

Moore created and funded the Peter Moore Foundation while in Liverpool, supporting such causes and institutions as social isolation, food poverty, cancer research and Alder Hey Hospital, and the new Clatterbridge Cancer Centre in Liverpool. He and his wife Debbie were named honorary life presidents of Fans Supporting Foodbanks, a volunteer organisation that collects food for those in need at football matches and various local events.

== Gresford Athletic FC ==
In August 2020, it was announced that Moore would become the honorary president of Gresford Athletic Football Club. He played as a right back for the club during the 1960s and 1970s, in both the youth team and first team.

== Wrexham AFC ==
In November 2020, it was announced that Moore would be involved with Wrexham AFC as an advisor to the new owners, actors Ryan Reynolds and Rob McElhenney.

== Unity Technologies ==
In January 2021, Moore was named SVP and GM of Sports and Live Entertainment for Unity Technologies. Later in the year, he was named to the boards of Nifty Games and Motorsport Games.

== Santa Barbara Sky FC ==
In July 2022, Moore publicly launched that he would take the helm as a founding owner for a planned American professional soccer team based in Santa Barbara, California. The team planned to play in USL Championship beginning in March 2026. On June 18, 2024, the Sky announced they had signed a multi-year contract to play at Harder Stadium. When the Sky FC takes to the pitch, it will be the first "true West Coast team" in the USL's Championship division, which currently has 11 clubs spread from Fresno to Madison, Wisconsin, and Statesboro, Georgia.
