= Shake Weight =

Exercise equipment

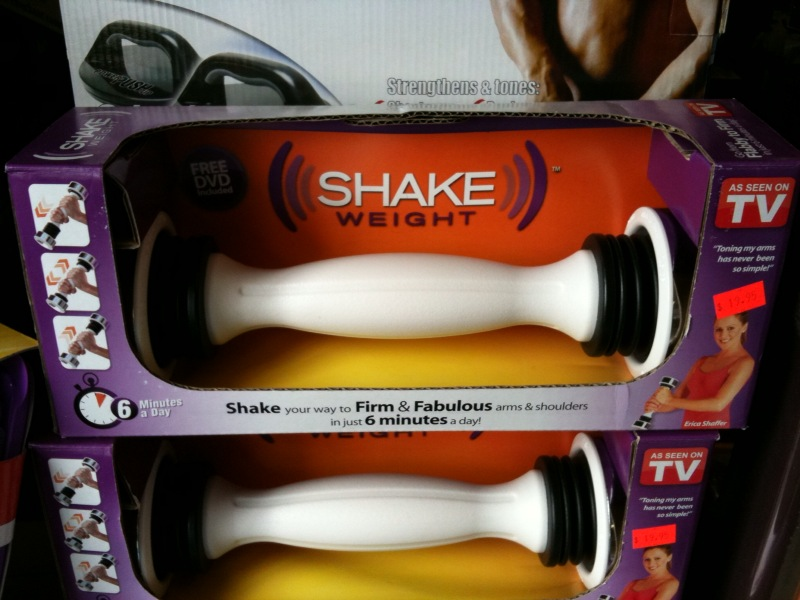
The Shake Weight on sale in stores

The Shake Weight is a modified dumbbell that oscillates, purportedly increasing the effects of exercise. As a result of the perceived sexually suggestive nature of the product, infomercial clips of the exercise device have gone viral.

A 2011 study in Consumer Reports states that for the chest, shoulder and triceps, the Shake Weight's exercises are inferior to conventional exercises that target the individual muscles. For the biceps, the results were similar. Additionally, the report found that the Shake Weight routines burned fewer calories than walking at 3 miles per hour (4.8 km/h).

== Specifications ==
The Shake Weight has a female and male version, though it was initially released as a product "designed specifically for women".

The female version weighs 2.5 pounds (1.13 kg). The male version weighs twice as much at 5 pounds (2.27 kg).

== Reception ==
Shake Weight has gained popular attention and parody because its use involves the appearance of pumping a phallic object. The product's commercials have been described by Diane Mapes of MSNBC as "slightly pornographic". Following its July 2009 debut, clips from a Shake Weight infomercial quickly went viral. The viral YouTube clip has more than 4,000,000 views. When Emma Stone visited Jimmy Kimmel Live! in September 2010 and host Jimmy Kimmel asked her if she had heard of "this great invention", her spontaneous reaction was "it's practically pornographic!". The Shake Weight commercial has also been parodied by Saturday Night Live, The Daily Show, Two and a Half Men, South Park ("Crème Fraîche"), Regular Show, A Very Harold & Kumar 3D Christmas, RuPaul's Drag Race, Deadpool, and Thor: Ragnarok.

== See also ==
- Vibrating belt machine
