= South Park season 15 =

Season of television series

South Park
- Season 15
- Home media release cover
- No. of episodes: 14

Release
- Original network: Comedy Central
- Original release: April 27 – November 16, 2011

Season chronology
- ← Previous; Season 14 Next → Season 16

The fifteenth season of the American animated sitcom South Park was picked up on January 10, 2011. It began airing on Comedy Central on April 27, 2011, and ended on November 16, 2011. In response to reactions to the mid-season finale episode "You're Getting Old", which seemed to insinuate that creators Trey Parker and Matt Stone were wrapping up the series, Comedy Central proclaimed through the media that South Park was renewed for two more seasons, and the duo were signed through 2013. Shortly before the airing of the season finale episode "The Poor Kid", South Park was extended again until 2016, taking the show to 20 seasons. Parker was the director and writer for all episodes, and Robert Lopez was the writer in this eleventh episode for the fifteenth season.

== Episodes ==
No. overall	No. in season	Title	Directed by	Written by	Original release date	Prod. code	U.S. viewers (millions)
210	1	"HumancentiPad"	Trey Parker	Trey Parker	April 27, 2011	1501	3.11
Kids at South Park Elementary have iPads, but Cartman does not. Meanwhile, Kyle is kidnapped by Apple employees.
211	2	"Funnybot"	Trey Parker	Trey Parker	May 4, 2011	1502	2.59
At a comedy show, Jimmy proclaims that Germany is the least funny country in the world. The German government responds by creating "Funnybot", who goes on to become a major celebrity. The kids try to derail Funnybot's career.
212	3	"Royal Pudding"	Trey Parker	Trey Parker	May 11, 2011	1503	2.43
Ike watches a Canadian royal wedding and takes action when the princess is kidnapped.
213	4	"T.M.I."	Trey Parker	Trey Parker	May 18, 2011	1504	2.42
Cartman rants over the results of the students' annual school physicals, thinking that teachers have posted a list of all the boys' penis sizes in the hall for everyone to see.
214	5	"Crack Baby Athletic Association"	Trey Parker	Trey Parker	May 25, 2011	1505	2.53
When Kyle volunteers at the hospital, he discovers a disturbing club.
215	6	"City Sushi"	Trey Parker	Trey Parker	June 1, 2011	1506	2.56
A new sushi restaurant causes issues for City Wok, while Butters is diagnosed with multiple personality disorder.
216	7	"You're Getting Old"	Trey Parker	Trey Parker	June 8, 2011	1507	2.30
When Stan attempts to listen to a new genre of music CD, a debate rages between the adults and the kids as to what music is really good.
217	8	"Ass Burgers"	Trey Parker	Trey Parker	October 5, 2011	1508	2.94
Cartman attempts to fake Asperger syndrome. Meanwhile, Stan cannot seem to get his life back to normal no matter what he tries.
218	9	"The Last of the Meheecans"	Trey Parker	Trey Parker	October 12, 2011	1509	2.90
What begins as an innocent game between the boys turns serious when Cartman joins the U.S. Border Patrol. Cartman turns out to be really good at stopping Mexicans.
219	10	"Bass to Mouth"	Trey Parker	Trey Parker	October 19, 2011	1510	2.43
The students of South Park Elementary are the victims of a new gossip website. An elusive hacker has somehow gained access into all the students' phone calls and e-mails and is posting all of their juicy stories on the Internet. The boys are shocked when they discover the identity of the hacker.
220	11	"Broadway Bro Down"	Trey Parker	Trey Parker & Robert Lopez (uncredited)	October 26, 2011	1511	2.92
After Randy takes Sharon to see the hit musical Wicked, he becomes Broadway's biggest fan and discovers that all Broadway musicals contain subtext encouraging women to give blowjobs to their men. Randy decides to bring Broadway to South Park by creating his own musical so the fun can never end.
221	12	"1%"	Trey Parker	Trey Parker	November 2, 2011	1512	2.85
The kids at South Park Elementary are being punished for Cartman's failings in the physical education department.
222	13	"A History Channel Thanksgiving"	Trey Parker	Trey Parker	November 9, 2011	1513	2.85
The boys discover the true meaning of Thanksgiving.
223	14	"The Poor Kid"	Trey Parker	Trey Parker	November 16, 2011	1514	2.41
When Kenny's parents are sent to prison, he and his siblings are sent to foster care. Cartman is upset about this because after Kenny is gone, he is now the poorest kid at school.

== See also ==
- South Park (Park County, Colorado)
- South Park City
