= You're Getting Old =

- South Park episode
- Episode no.: Season 15; Episode 7
- Directed by: Trey Parker
- Written by: Trey Parker
- Production code: 1507
- Original air date: June 8, 2011

Guest appearance
- Bill Hader as Farmer #2

Episode chronology
| ← Previous "City Sushi" | Next → "Ass Burgers" |
- South Park season 15

"You're Getting Old" is the seventh episode of the fifteenth season of the American animated television series South Park, and the 216th episode of the series overall. It first aired on Comedy Central in the United States on June 8, 2011. In the episode, Stan begins to develop a profound sense of cynicism after celebrating his tenth birthday, where he is literally seeing everything as "shit". Meanwhile, Randy latches onto a new music genre, "tween wave", in an attempt to fit in, which causes problems in his marriage with Sharon.

The episode was written by series co-creator Trey Parker and was produced at the end of the show's "spring" run. He and co-creator Matt Stone had created the idea of Stan's existential crisis as a parallel with their own real-life aging. "You're Getting Old" ends abruptly; Stan's parents separate and his problem remains unresolved. The conclusion was inspired by modern television dramas, which are often serialized and are less likely to have the standard "happy ending". The episode created significant media attention, and was interpreted by some critics as a metaphor for the frustration experienced by creators Parker and Stone stemming from the show's continued production; other critics, and several viewers, speculated on whether the episode was meant as a series finale.

The episode received very positive reviews from contemporaneous television-critics, who praised the episode's ending and overarching theme on growing older. According to Nielsen Media Research, the episode was seen by 2.29 million viewers the week it was broadcast. The episode's ending is continued in the mid-season premiere, "Ass Burgers", which aired in October 2011. "You're Getting Old" was released on DVD and Blu-ray along with the rest of the fifteenth season on March 27, 2012.

== Plot ==
At Stan Marsh's tenth birthday party, his present from Kyle is the latest CD from a "tween wave" band, but Sharon forbids Stan from listening to the CD and promptly takes it away, much to his ire. His parents argue over the matter, with Randy claiming that Sharon simply derides anything from younger generations. He decides to sit down and listen to the CD (which, to the viewer and the adults, is the sound of drum beats and defecation). Randy claims to enjoy the CD, but Sharon does not believe him. As tween wave music becomes popular, Sharon and the other boys' parents forbid them from listening to any of it, and try to play for them The Police's song "Every Breath You Take" as an example of what they consider to be good music. To the boys and the viewer, however, it literally sounds like people defecating on the soundtrack, just as the "tween wave" music is presented as sounding to the adults. That night, Stan secretly listens to the confiscated music but discovers, to his confusion, that it now too "sounds like shit."

Stan goes to the doctor, who, after examining him, diagnoses him as a "cynical asshole." From ice cream to movie trailers, Stan can now only see the bad in things, and this negative outlook alienates him from Kyle, Kenny, and Cartman, who begin avoiding him. When Stan catches them secretly going to the movies without him after lying about having the flu, he comes along, only for his attitude to ruin the trailers and Kyle, Kenny, and Cartman leave the theater. Cartman then coldly informs Stan that they do not want to hang out with him anymore and leaves with Kenny. As Stan and Kyle argue over this, Stan literally sees Kyle as a large piece of feces that defecates instead of talking, indicating that he sees them as "shit." Realizing he now sees them as he does everything else, he just walks away.

Sharon accuses Randy of merely feigning interest in modern music in order to hold onto his childhood dreams of being a musician, and deny that he is getting older. Randy, however, ignores her, and starts performing tween wave music at the local bowling alley under the name "Steamy Ray Vaughn," with flatulence as part of the act. During a duet with a woman billing herself as "Steamy Nicks," Sharon catches Randy at the bowling alley, resulting in an argument. She excoriates him for the various schemes and fads that he has often briefly taken with over the years, such as getting into fights at baseball games, playing World of Warcraft, and becoming a celebrity chef. Randy replies that he has been unhappy for a long time. Sharon says she shares his unhappiness, and the two admit they seem "shitty" to each other. Two old farmers, who previously watched Randy perform, overhear the argument and break into the Marshes' home to steal Randy's underwear, believing that they are acting humanely on its behalf.

As Fleetwood Mac's song "Landslide" plays, Sharon and Randy separate and sell their house, with Stan, Sharon, and Shelley moving into a new home. The police arrest the farmers and recover Randy's underwear. A better bond appears to develop between Kyle and Cartman, who share a smile while playing video games together (a bonding activity Stan and Kyle once shared). Stan, now completely alienated from his friends, shows no signs of his cynicism ending.

== Production ==
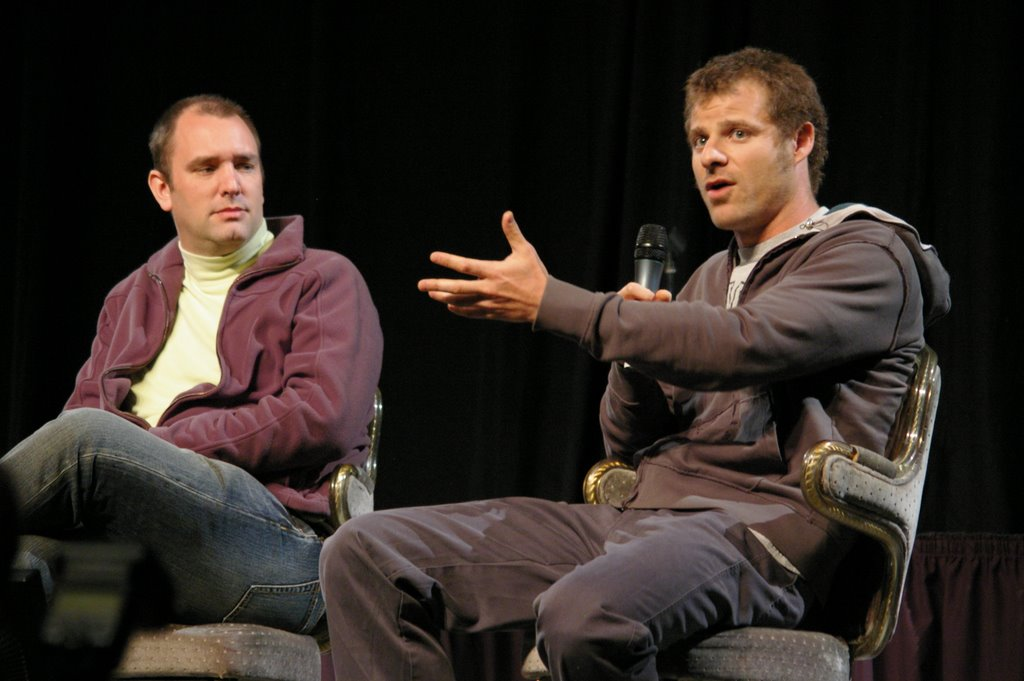
The story arc that concerned Stan Marsh's feelings of age were written to echo similar life passages of creators Trey Parker (left) and Matt Stone (right), who were now in their early 40s at the time of production.

"You're Getting Old" was the final episode of the spring run, which contained the first seven episodes of South Park's fifteenth season. The first element of the episode's plot line to be crafted was Stan's tenth birthday and his feeling of getting old, as a reference to Parker and Stone's own aging (at the time of the episode's broadcast, Stone had just turned 40 and Parker was 41). They decided to make a two-part episode, with the second half airing at the beginning of the fall run, set to begin in October 2011. Parker and Stone did not write the second part until they reconvened in the fall.

Another idea from which the episode was crafted was the fictional "tween wave" genre: initially, the episode would have found the genre enjoyed by all citizens of the town of South Park, not just a younger audience. By Sunday, completed animated shots were being edited together and set to the song "Landslide" by Fleetwood Mac. The song's use in the episode was uncertain until the night before the episode's premiere, when the production received clearance to use it. Parker noted later that they had backup songs to use if necessary, though none fit as well as "Landslide", The producers were very satisfied with the ending, feeling it provided a very emotional conclusion to the show. In addition, the episode contains what Parker describes in the commentary as "our favorite thing of any South Park ever": the Duck President, who communicates by spraying feces from his mouth. "Every time in the retake room when Duck President was on, shitting, quacking and shitting, we just thought it was the greatest thing ever", he remarked.

The dialogue between Sharon and Randy that would provoke significant attention was not scripted until less than 48 hours prior to broadcast, and was one of the last completed parts of the show. Parker likened the scene to an afterthought, as he felt it was not necessarily central to the episode's story.

== Themes ==
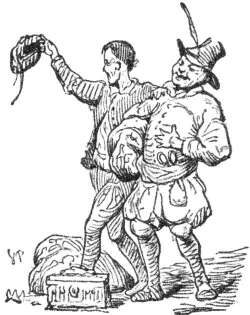
Co-creator Trey Parker likened Randy's dilemma with the Hans Christian Andersen short story "The Emperor's New Clothes".

The episode's main theme has been described as "universal and timeless, but also specific and personal: growing up and dealing with change." The episode makes it clear that Stan's pre-adolescent battle with cynicism is not necessarily representative of all "tweens"; one reviewer described the character's problem as more common to depression. The episode also mocks how "cynical culture breeds cynical audiences", typified in the "contemptuous trailers" for predictable films during the scene set at the cinema, which often end with the insult "Fuck you!" Sean O'Neal, in the episode's review at The A.V. Club, linked the episode's theme to modern culture: "The Internet has turned nearly everyone into a cynic." Time reviewer James Poniewozik disagreed with his assessment, but did note that "there's definitely an argument that the instant dissection of all experience online encourages a kind of protective dismissiveness." The episode was also interpreted as a satire of immediate online responses from fans, who criticize South Park as stale but continue to watch regardless.

South Park generally ends on a positive note and "resets" upon the next episode, in which way it is connected to traditional television sitcoms, as it does not serialize or employ story arcs with frequency. An example of this format is best characteristic of the show's early years, in which the character of Kenny was killed in each episode. In contrast, the stark, abrupt ending of "You're Getting Old" was inspired by modern television dramas, in which events can go poorly, and the episode ends regardless. The character of Sharon references this in one of the episode's final moments, criticizing, on a metafictional level, the show's form and reliance on "happy endings". Stone likened this structure to an "immature view of the world": he remarks in the episode's DVD commentary that things do not often end on a "happy" note in real-life. Likewise, the dialogue between Sharon and Randy about their broken relationship near the end of the episode functions as commentary on the show's general form, which is consequently broken.

A central element of the episode's plot line concerns the fictional "tween wave" genre of music, which consists of audible flatulence and defecation in a literal sense. In the episode, children love tween wave while adults are generally repelled by it; this joke serves as a commentary on generation gaps. In this sense, Parker related it to the plot line of the Hans Christian Andersen short story "The Emperor's New Clothes". Reviewers interpreted the episode's use of literal feces as just a simple example of the show's use of scatological humor, but also a comment on the dismissiveness of things vulgarly described as "crap" or "shit". Alan Sepinwall of HitFix interpreted the final dialogue as a criticism of those lacking passion, and also an observation on the show's recurring philosophy, which he described as the exact opposite: "how other people care too much about things, and that many of our big problems and scandals would go away if everyone could just relax and feel less passionate."

== Cultural references ==
The episode makes reference to the 2011 films Mr. Popper's Penguins and Jack and Jill, the latter an Adam Sandler comedy notable for its extremely poor reception. Its inclusion in the episode was actually based on the film's trailer. Reviewers suggested various different musical genres as the "tween wave" genre parodied in the episode, including dubstep, crabcore, and chillwave. In addition, prior to the episode's broadcast, Todd Martens of the Los Angeles Times predicted "tween wave" would be a spoof of the hip hop group Odd Future, who were also receiving heavy media attention at that time. In his desperate attempt to fit in with popular music, Stan's father, Randy, forms his own tween wave act: "Steamy Ray Vaughan", a pun on the blues guitarist Stevie Ray Vaughan, who collaborates with singer "Steamy Nicks", a pun on Stevie Nicks, vocalist from Fleetwood Mac. The episode also makes reference to the 2011 video game L.A. Noire, and an arcade machine for the game Custer's Revenge appears in the background during Randy's musical performance at the bowling alley.

== Reception ==
=== Media coverage ===
Comedy Central's press release prior to the airing of the episode alluded to its significance, stating: "After Stan celebrates his 10th birthday, he begins to see everything differently... The very fabric of South Park begins to unravel." Coinciding with production and performance of the Broadway musical The Book of Mormon produced by the South Park creators, there had been speculation over doubt within the writing team on the future of South Park. Following the episode's broadcast, it received significant media attention due to its ending and themes. Much of the conversation centered on the final scene of dialogue between the Marshes, with Entertainment Weekly noting it could be "a not-so-thinly-veiled way of Stone and Parker telling us they had a similar discussion about their very show." Critics pointed to a March 2011 profile in The Hollywood Reporter, in which they spoke at how they dreaded to return to producing South Park: "I don't know how we're going to do it. It's a nightmare." "Knowing that Parker and Stone have been experiencing a bit of an existential crisis or even just restlessness definitely made tonight seem unusually thematically heavy", remarked Sean O'Neal of The A.V. Club.

Parker and Stone were in New York to attend the 65th Tony Awards, and during the ensuring press junkets were asked about the episode. On June 15, 2011, Parker and Stone appeared on The Daily Show with Jon Stewart, where they denied being unhappy with the show and stated that they still enjoyed producing episodes. Parker commented that, while the episode did deal with some issues they had with the show, they particularly enjoyed creating "You're Getting Old", and that despite not knowing what upcoming episodes would be about, they would resolve such questions upon resuming production in August 2011. "Looking back at it, it kinda does look like we’re kinda saying we don't want to do this anymore, but it's not really what we were saying", said Parker in the episode's DVD commentary.

=== Critical reception ===
In its original American broadcast on June 8, 2011, "You're Getting Old" was watched by 2.295 million viewers, according to Nielsen Media Research.

It's easy to draw a lot of parallels between the Marsh males and what the SP creators themselves are surely going through. When Trey and Matt started this journey, they were young men challenging the world. Now they are middle-aged industry veterans with new interests and new perspectives. Maybe they've just outgrown their own brand of humor, and no longer want to try to appeal to the tastes of their younger audience.

— IGN review of "You're Getting Old"

Reaction to "You're Getting Old" was positive. Critics pointed to the self-referencing aim of the episode in growing older and redefining senses of humor as well as cynicism. While Ramsey Isler of IGN found the episode to be largely humorless and monotonous, he interpreted this as intentional on the part of the show's creators, who he believed had grown weary of creating the series. Isler called the final moments of the episode "the most somber material the series has ever produced... providing the emotional soundtrack for a montage of images that just rip the heart out of any South Park fan", giving the episode an 8.5/10. HitFix's review on the episode focused on its personal philosophic themes, with reviewer Alan Sepinwall stating "But what was interesting about Stan's existential crisis, and how he struggled to like anything, is that the show's philosophy has often largely been about how other people care too much about things... Yet here, Stan's lack of passion – and the Marsh parents' – was clearly shown to be a bad thing for them."

Sean O'Neal of The A.V. Club commented on the "finality" of the episode, noting that although the creators were still under contract until 2013, "there are already scores of people questioning on IMDB boards and Twitter whether it was, in fact, a surprise series finale." O'Neal saw the use of the Fleetwood Mac song "Landslide" (the only song in the episode that does not feature the sounds of defecation) in the episode's closing moments to have served as "both a parody of a self-serious drama's season finale and an actual, self-serious, dramatic season finale." James Poniewozik of Time remarked that the episode moved him to tears, commenting that it is "one of those episodes that managed to combine the many different things lesser South Park episodes do individually: pop-culture parody, scatological hilarity and stories about childhood." He described the dialogue between the Marshes as "stunningly genuine", summarizing the episode as "simultaneously one of the most juvenile episodes South Park has ever done, and possibly its most mature."

In December 2011, Time magazine ranked the episode at #7 in its list of Top 10 TV Episodes of 2011, with James Poniewozik commenting, "With no easy wrap-up to Stan's depression and ending with an entirely unironic montage set to 'Landslide', South Park showed that it too can grow up — if, thankfully, not by much."
