= City Sushi =

- South Park episode
- Episode no.: Season 15; Episode 6
- Directed by: Trey Parker
- Written by: Trey Parker
- Production code: 1506
- Original air date: June 1, 2011

Episode chronology
← Previous "Crack Baby Athletic Association"	Next → "You're Getting Old"
- South Park season 15

"City Sushi" is the sixth episode of the fifteenth season of the American animated sitcom South Park and the 215th episode of the series overall. It premiered on Comedy Central in the United States on June 1, 2011. In the episode, Butters is misdiagnosed with multiple personality disorder. Meanwhile, Tuong Lu Kim takes on South Park's new Japanese resident, who has put a sushi restaurant right next to his City Wok.

The episode was written by series co-creator Trey Parker and is rated TV-MA in the United States. It parodies several horror films, such as Psycho, Paranormal Activity and the thriller Identity.

== Plot ==
Butters is distributing flyers for a newly opened Japanese restaurant named City Sushi, though nobody seems interested. He gives one to Tuong Lu Kim, the owner of the Chinese restaurant City Wok. Enraged at the prospect of a Japanese restaurant next to his, Lu Kim enters the establishment and gets in a fight with the owner, a Japanese man named Junichi Takayama (the same one from "HumancentiPad"). Butters is blamed for the incident by the police who claim he started an "Asian turf war". After Butters is grounded and sent to his room, Linda wonders what is wrong with him. Stephen, after dismissing the idea that either of them are the issue, decides that Butters must have mental problems so they take him to therapy. The psychiatrist, Dr. Janus, misdiagnoses Butters with multiple personality disorder, even though Butters is clearly just a child using his imagination, including playing as a firefighter, supervillain, detective and truck driver. When questioning Butters, it becomes apparent that Dr. Janus ironically has multiple personality disorder himself which severely confuses and frightens Butters.

Meanwhile, Lu Kim is further infuriated that everyone in South Park is lumping Chinese and Japanese together, such as the town naming its Chinatown "Little Tokyo". He concocts a plan to get rid of Takayama by first faking a truce and then publicly humiliating him at the school by displaying old stock photos of the atrocities Japan committed against China during the Second Sino-Japanese War (such as the Nanjing Massacre) and a chart that greatly exaggerates the country's rate of suicides. Lu Kim later makes an apology to Takayama, proposing a new peace between the two restaurants by throwing an "Asian Diversity Festival". Against his better judgement, Takayama agrees. Lu Kim leaves Takayama a note telling him to come to the top of what Lu Kim calls the "Tower of Peace" where he really intends to murder Takayama and make it look like a suicide which would not arouse suspicion, due to the stereotype behind it.

Upon advice from Dr. Janus, Butters films himself while sleeping and sees Dr. Janus enter his bedroom, beat him and urinate on his face. When confronted with this, Dr. Janus becomes a violent personality and forces Butters to break into a jewellery store with him. However, mid-heist, Dr. Janus reverts to his doctor personality and turns Butters over to the police thinking he decided to rob the store himself. While Butters is in his garden, Dr. Janus, in the personality of a young boy called Billy, begs for Butters' help saying Dr. Janus is getting worse. They go to Dr. Janus's house to look for answers but Billy reverts to Dr. Janus before cycling through his many other personalities. Butters flees and enters a room full of defaced flyers and posters of Takayama and his City Sushi restaurant where he learns to his horror that "Tuong Lu Kim" is, and always was, yet another split-personality of the therapist. Even though Dr. Janus is white, his most dominant alternate persona is the owner of the local Chinese restaurant, and for years, Janus has effectively convinced the people of South Park that he is the Chinese "Tuong Lu Kim" by squinting his eyes and speaking in a stereotypical Chinese accent. Lu Kim leaves Butters after seeing he is late to the festival. Butters contacts the police who arrive at the festival just as Lu Kim is attempting to push Takayama off the tower and visibly changes his personality in plain sight before the town. Upon finding out that Lu Kim was white all along, Takayama comes to the realization that he has brought shame upon himself and commits suicide by jumping over the edge of the tower, despite yelling, "No! This is racial stereotype!", and lands on the City Sushi building, destroying it on impact.

Butters is praised as a hero by the police for exposing the split identities of Dr. Janus, and his parents, upon learning the truth of the events, are proud of him. Despite Takayama's harassment and death and the disorganized state of Janus's mental health, the police decide to keep Lu Kim around since he owns the only Chinese restaurant in South Park. The episode ends with a scene parodying the ending of Psycho; Lu Kim sits in a prison cell, covered in a blanket, and when a fly lands on him, and he says he will show them he is fine as he would not even harm a fly, before a shot of Dr. Janus covers his face, followed by a final shot of City Wok.

== Cultural references ==
Dr. Janus is named after Roman god Janus, god of transitions. This god is generally depicted with two faces: one on the front of his head and one on the back.

The scene in which Butters watches a video he recorded of his night sleeping is a reference to the film Paranormal Activity (Butters acknowledges that he got the idea from the film) and the final scene with Lu Kim parodies that of the film Psycho.

In the scene where Butters is playing as a trucker, he is quoting parts of the song "Convoy" by C. W. McCall.

In the scene where Dr. Janus first reveals his multiple personalities, one of the personalities says, "The horned toad says we should go to Mexico". The line is a quote from the movie The Outlaw Josey Wales, spoken by the character Lone Watie, portrayed by veteran actor Chief Dan George.

== Critical reception ==
Assignment X rated the episode B+, stating that South Park had "emerged from its slump", stating "the spoof of horror movies is where the episode really excels". The A.V. Club gave it the same rating, praising the creators on their "mindfulness" of not diluting Butters' character by repeatedly putting him in the spotlight. Meanwhile, IGN gave the episode a mixed review, stating "so far, this season has displayed a drastic drop in quality, and it's sad when even Butters can't put it right".

== See also ==
- Xiao Riben
