= Crème Fraîche (South Park) =

- South Park episode
- Episode no.: Season 14; Episode 14
- Directed by: Trey Parker
- Written by: Trey Parker
- Production code: 1414
- Original air date: November 17, 2010

Episode chronology
← Previous "Coon vs. Coon and Friends"	Next → "HumancentiPad"
- South Park season 14

"Crème Fraîche" is the fourteenth episode and season finale of the fourteenth season of American animated television series South Park, and the 209th episode of the series overall. It was first broadcast on Comedy Central in the United States on November 17, 2010. "Crème Fraîche" was written and directed by series co-creator Trey Parker.

In the episode, Stan's life is reduced to shambles both at home and in school due to Randy's new obsession with the Food Network. Sharon explores a new interest of her own in a Shake Weight, which she is forced into using on the daily. In its original American broadcast on November 17, 2010, "Crème Fraîche" was watched by 2.87 million viewers, according to the Nielsen Media Research. It was the highest viewed scripted show of the day. It received a 1.9 rating/5% share among adult viewers between ages 18 and 49.

== Plot ==
Randy has taken an erotic interest in cooking thanks to TV programs on the Food Network. Spending whole nights watching and masturbating to these programs inspires him to replicate the recipes and serve them to his family but leave the task of cleaning to them. Sharon becomes fed up with Randy's behavior, and assumes his fetish for cooking must be because she has become unattractive to him. Encouraged by Sheila Broflovski and TV commercials for the Shake Weight exercise equipment, she eventually buys one with a digital voice which constantly advises, flatters, and instructs her during exercises. In line with the general parody of this device seen in United States popular culture since its début, exercise with the Shake Weight blatantly resembles a handjob — complete with "release" of a "cooling fluid" on the exerciser's face when "done". Sharon's Shake Weight also dispenses "cab fare" into her palm and goes to "sleep mode" (resembling a flaccid penis) at the conclusion of workouts. At one point it coaxes Sharon into sticking her finger into a backside receptacle, ostensibly to take her pulse, as described on TV.

At South Park Elementary, Randy is discovered to have taken over as cafeteria chef (embracing his predecessor's mannerisms), having quit his job to do so. Ignoring the planned school lunch menus. Randy then forces Stan, Kyle, Cartman and Kenny to film him as if he were on his own cooking show. Cartman attempts to impersonate chef Gordon Ramsay to try and discourage Randy's passion for cooking, but the plan falls apart when various celebrity chefs such as Jamie Oliver and Bobby Flay arrive in the cafeteria to start a new competitive cooking show, entitled Hell's Kitchen Nightmares Iron Top Chef Cafeteria Throwdown Ultimate Cookoff Challenge. Sharon is increasingly drawn to her Shake Weight and takes a vacation to a beach resort to exercise with it in private. A short time later however, the Shake Weight's incessant demands to workout, including in public, begin to annoy her.

Back at the cafeteria, Randy eventually leaves for home when he cannot find his key ingredient, crème fraîche. Sharon coincidentally returns home determined to resolve whatever is wrong with their marriage thanks to Randy's obsession with cooking. When Randy mentions he has not slept for several days and that he was "in work mode", Sharon offers a solution, using her experience handling the Shake Weight to give Randy a "nice old fashioned". Afterwards, Randy becomes tired and falls asleep in bed, having lost all interest in cooking, and promises to get his job back the next day. Later that night, Sharon thanks the Shake Weight, having figured out its true purpose as a marriage saver. Saying that its work is done, the Shake Weight bids farewell and shuts itself off.

== Cultural references ==
The episode lampoons the recent rise in popularity of cooking shows on the Food Network. The first cooking show Randy watches (and pleasures himself to) is Guy's Big Bite, starring Guy Fieri. Cartman impersonates Gordon Ramsay, which prompts other TV chefs to appear as well – Jamie Oliver, Mario Batali, Bobby Flay, Masaharu Morimoto, Alton Brown, Giada De Laurentiis, and Paula Deen. The virally popular "Shake Weight" commercial is largely referenced. Jamie Oliver's outcry is a reference to both the Channel 4 series broadcast "Jamie's School Dinners" and the American Jamie Oliver's Food Revolution. The theme song to Randy's cooking show is a parody of the "Trololo" song performed by Eduard Khil. The scene where Sharon "elopes" with the Shake Weight sitting on beach chairs bears a striking resemblance to a series of Corona commercials (to the point where two bottles of Corona can be seen onscreen in the background). Terrance and Phillip return in a parody of insurance commercials, referencing Progressive and GEICO.

== Reception ==
In its original American broadcast on November 17, 2010, "Crème Fraîche" was watched by 2.487 million viewers, according to Nielsen Media Research, making it the most watched cable television show of the night. The episode received a 1.6 rating/3 share, meaning it was seen by 1.6 percent of the population, and 3% of people watching television at the time of the broadcast. Among male viewers between ages 18 and 34, the episode received a 2.7 rating/9 share. Among adult viewers between ages 18 and 49, "Crème Fraîche" received a 1.4 rating/4 share, falling two tenths in the ratings, however it was one of the only cable television shows that night to receive a rating higher than 1.0 among adults between 18 and 49 years of age (the other shows being Psych, Meet the Browns and The Ultimate Fighter).

IGN rated the episode 8.0, saying "This episode didn't waste any time with the jokes, as it opens with a dig at Carnival Cruise Lines and how smelling like poop would actually be an improvement for their ship. That joke is quickly followed by Randy Marsh ignoring his wife's requests to avoid the 'no-no' channel, and we soon find that Randy has a case of Sitophilia (a food fetish) that is only satisfied by the sweet, sweet food love on Food Network."

Sean O'Neal of The A.V. Club gave the episode a positive review, saying the episode a "giddy, last-day-of-school-after-a-hectic-semester, let’s-get-this-final-paper-over-with-so-we-can-get-out-of-here vibe". Sean rated the episode a B−.

Gordon Ramsay enjoyed the references to him and his shows in the episode, tweeting about it one evening whilst watching it. In a Reddit AMA, Alton Brown called the episode a "Pinacle [sic] of comedic genius," adding that he "would never rub a pork loin with butter."

== Home media ==
"Crème Fraîche", along with the 13 other episodes from South Park's 14th season, was released on a three-disc DVD set and two-disc Blu-ray set in the United States on April 26, 2011.
