= TV Parental Guidelines =

United States television age-based ratings

The TV Parental Guidelines is a television content rating system in the United States. The system consists of six age-based ratings as well as content descriptors categorizing content by letters displayed underneath the rating symbol; examples of which include suggestive dialogue (D), sexual situations (S), coarse language (L), and/or violence (V). The ratings are generally applied to most television series and films. Premium channels also assign ratings from the TV Parental Guidelines on film broadcasts that have been released theatrically or on home video, even if the Motion Picture Association did not assign a film rating or if the channel aired an unrated version of a film.

It was first proposed by the United States Congress and the Federal Communications Commission (FCC) on December 19, 1996. The system was integrated to most major broadcast and cable networks on January 1, 1997 in response to public concerns about increasing amounts of mature content in television programming. While TV Parental Guidelines is a self-regulatory scheme that was voluntarily adopted by the United States' broadcasting industry, federal law requires televisions manufactured since 2000 and all digital television receivers to include parental controls that allow programming to be filtered based on the TV Parental Guidelines rating (typically referred to as "V-chip").

== Development of the guidelines ==
In 1993, the four major American broadcast networks (ABC, CBS, Fox, and NBC) began airing disclaimers before programs with violent content. This came amid increasing concern over the effects of violence in mass media, and was described by The Washington Post as an attempt to avoid government-imposed regulations. Three years later, the Telecommunications Act of 1996 was passed, which called upon the entertainment industry to establish, within one year, a voluntary television rating system to provide parents with advance information on material in television programming that might be unsuitable for their children. This rating system would work in conjunction with the V-chip, a device embedded in television sets that enables parents to block programming they determine to be inappropriate.

On February 29, 1996, all segments of the entertainment industry, led by the National Association of Broadcasters (NAB), the National Cable & Telecommunications Association (NCTA), and the Motion Picture Association of America (MPAA), joined and voluntarily pledged to create such a system. They agreed that the guidelines would be applied by broadcast and cable networks in order to handle the large amount of programming that must be reviewed – some 2,000 hours a day. The guidelines would be applied episodically to all programming based on their content, except for news, sports and advertising.

The same year on December 19, the industry announced the creation of the TV Parental Guidelines, a voluntary system of guidelines providing parents with information to help them make more informed choices about the television programs their children watch. The guidelines were modeled after the movie ratings system created by the Motion Picture Association of America in 1968. The television industry agreed to insert a ratings icon on-screen at the beginning of all rated programs, and to encode the guidelines for use with the V-chip. The industry also created a Monitoring Board, composed of TV industry experts, to ensure accuracy, uniformity and consistency of the guidelines and to consider any public questions about the guideline applied to a particular program. The TV Parental Guidelines went into use on January 1, 1997.

In response to calls to provide additional content information in the ratings system, on August 1, 1997, the television industry, in conjunction with representatives of children's and medical advocacy groups, announced revisions to the rating system. Under this revised system, television programming would continue to fall into one of the six ratings categories (TV-Y, TV-Y7, TV-G, TV-PG, TV-14 or TV-MA), but content descriptors would be added to the ratings where appropriate, based on the type(s) of objectionable content included in the individual program or episode: D (suggestive dialogue), L (coarse language), S (sexual content), V (violence) and FV (fantasy violence – a descriptor exclusively for use in the TV-Y7 category).

Further, the proposal stated that the icons and associated content symbols would appear for 15 seconds at the beginning of all rated programming, and that the size of the icons would be increased. The revised guidelines were supported by leading family and child advocacy groups, as well as television broadcasters, cable systems and networks, and television production companies. Finally, the revised proposal called for five representatives of the advocacy community to be added to the TV Parental Guidelines Monitoring Board. On March 12, 1998, the Federal Communications Commission found that the Industry Video Programming Rating System was acceptable, and adopted technical requirements for the V-chip.

The TV Parental Guidelines have since been voluntarily adopted by streaming services in the United States, such as HBO Max, Hulu, and Netflix. These classifications are usually used for non-film programming such as television series (including programs that had previously been aired on television). Films are usually classified using MPA ratings if available, but TV Parental Guidelines-based ratings are typically used as a fallback if the film does not carry an MPA rating.

In June 2021, creators, writers, and directors of TV animation in a report for the website Insider said that one of the forms of pressure to have less overt depiction of LGBTQ+ characters or culture was the TV Parental Guidelines system, resulting in domestic and international content being cut out of episodes. One of the criticisms was that the rarely updated guidelines offer no guidance on LGBTQ+ representation and the ratings are only changed "in the face of complaints". In April 2026, the FCC opened a public review into the TV Parental Guidelines scrutinizing the incorporation of "controversial gender identity issues" in programming rated as being appropriate for children, a move that has been considered as being part of the second Trump administration's ongoing attacks against transgender people.

== Ratings ==
The direct description of each rating from the TV Parental Guidelines Monitoring Board is listed above the extended ratings description in italics.

=== TV-Y ===

This program is designed to be appropriate for all children.
Designed to be appropriate for children of all ages. The thematic elements portrayed in programs with this rating are specifically designed for a very young audience, including children from ages 2 to 6.

=== TV-Y7 ===

This program is designed for children age 7 and above.
Designed for children age 7 and older. The FCC states that it "may be more appropriate for children who have acquired the developmental skills needed to distinguish between make-believe and reality". The thematic elements portrayed in programs with this rating contain mild fantasy and comedic violence.

Programs where fantasy violence may be more intense or more combative.
Programs given the "FV" content descriptor exhibit more 'fantasy violence' and are generally more intense or combative than other programs rated TV-Y7.

=== TV-G ===

Most parents will find this program suitable for all ages.
Programs are generally suitable for all audiences, though they may not necessarily contain content of interest to children. The FCC states that "this rating does not signify a program designed specifically for children, [and] most parents may let younger children watch this program unattended". The thematic elements portrayed in programs with this rating contain little or no violence, mild language, and little or no sexual dialogue or situations.

=== TV-PG ===

This program contains material that parents may find unsuitable for younger children.
Programs may contain some material that parents or guardians may find inappropriate for younger children. Programs assigned a TV-PG rating may include infrequent coarse language, some sexual content, some suggestive dialogue, or moderate violence.

=== TV-14 ===

This program contains material that many parents would find unsuitable for children under 14 years of age.
Programs contain material that parents or adult guardians may find unsuitable for children under the age of 14. The FCC warns that "parents are cautioned to exercise some care in monitoring this program and are cautioned against letting children under the age of 14 watch unattended". Programs with this rating contain intensely suggestive dialogue, strong coarse language, intense sexual situations or intense violence.

=== TV-MA ===

This program is specifically designed to be viewed by adults and therefore may be unsuitable for children under 17.
Contains content that may be unsuitable for children. This rating was originally TV-M prior to the announced revisions to the rating system in August 1997 but was changed due to a trademark dispute and in order to remove confusion with the Entertainment Software Rating Board's (ESRB) "M for Mature" rating for video games. This rating is rarely used by broadcast networks or local television stations due to FCC restrictions on program content, although it is commonly applied to television programs featured on certain cable channels (basic and premium networks) and streaming networks for both mainstream and softcore programs. Programs with this rating may include crude indecent language, explicit sexual activity and graphic violence.

=== Content descriptors ===
An example of a TV rating containing content descriptors to inform viewers of the program's content.

Up to four content descriptors can be applied alongside an assigned rating, depending on the kind of content featured in a program. Some thematic elements, according to the FCC, "may call for parental guidance and/or the program may contain one or more of the following" sub-ratings, designated with an alphabetic letter:

- D – Suggestive dialogue (not used with the TV-MA rating)
- L – Adult language
- S – Sexual situations
- V – Violence
  - FV – Fantasy violence (exclusive to the TV-Y7 rating)

The "Suggestive Dialogue" (D) and "Fantasy Violence" (FV) descriptors were created in 1997: the "D" descriptor was created for suggestive language that does not cross the line into vulgar language, and its application is reserved for TV-PG and TV-14 rated programs only; the "FV" applies exclusively to TV-Y7 programs. These descriptors allow for 44 possible combinations for all the ratings total.

Rating	Suggestive Dialogue (D)	Language (L)	Sexual Content (S)	Violence (V)	Fantasy Violence (FV)	E/I
TV-Y	✗ (unused)	✗ (unused)	✗ (unused)	✗ (unused)	✗ (unused)	✓
TV-Y7	✗ (unused)	✗ (unused)	✗ (unused)	✗ (unused)	✓ (exclusive use)	✓
TV-G	✗ (unused)	✗ (unused)	✗ (unused)	✗ (unused)	✗ (unused)	✓
TV-PG	✓ (used)	✓ (used)	✓ (used)	✓ (used)	✗ (unused)	✗
TV-14	✓ (used)	✓ (used)	✓ (used)	✓ (used)	✗ (unused)	✗
TV-MA	✗ (unused)	✓ (used)	✓ (used)	✓ (used)	✗ (unused)	✗

== See also ==
- Television content rating system
- United States pay television content advisory system
- Motion Picture Association film rating system
- Canadian TV rating systems
