= List of awards and nominations received by South Park =

This is a list of awards and nominations given to the American animated television series South Park.

== Primetime Emmy Awards ==
Year	Category	Nominee(s)	Result
1998	Outstanding Animated Program (One Hour or Less)	"Big Gay Al's Big Gay Boat Ride"	Nominated
2000	Outstanding Animated Program (One Hour or Less)	"Chinpokomon"	Nominated
2002	Outstanding Animated Program (One Hour or Less)	"Osama bin Laden Has Farty Pants"	Nominated
2004	Outstanding Animated Program (One Hour or Less)	"Christmas in Canada"	Nominated
2005	Outstanding Animated Program (One Hour or Less)	"Best Friends Forever"	Won
2006	Outstanding Animated Program (One Hour or Less)	"Trapped in the Closet"	Nominated
2007	Outstanding Animated Program (One Hour or Less)	"Make Love, Not Warcraft"	Won
2008	Outstanding Animated Program (More Than One Hour)	"Imaginationland: The Movie"	Won
2009	Outstanding Animated Program (One Hour or Less)	"Margaritaville"	Won
2010	Outstanding Animated Program	"200"/"201"	Nominated
2011	Outstanding Animated Program	"Crack Baby Athletic Association"	Nominated
2013	Outstanding Animated Program	"Raising the Bar"	Won
2014	Outstanding Animated Program	"Black Friday"	Nominated
2015	Outstanding Animated Program	"Freemium Isn't Free"	Nominated
2016	Outstanding Animated Program	"You're Not Yelping"	Nominated
2016	Outstanding Character Voice-Over Performance	Trey Parker for "Stunning and Brave"	Nominated
2016	Outstanding Character Voice-Over Performance	Matt Stone for "Tweek x Craig"	Nominated
2017	Outstanding Animated Program	"Member Berries"	Nominated
2018	Outstanding Animated Program	"Put it Down"	Nominated
2021	Outstanding Animated Program	"The Pandemic Special"	Nominated
2026	Outstanding Animated Program	"Sermon on the 'Mount"	Won
2026	Outstanding Character Voice-Over Performance	Trey Parker	Nominated
2026	Outstanding Original Music and Lyrics	"Christian Woman" (from "The Crap Out")	Nominated
2026	Television Academy Honors Award	—N/a	Honored

== Academy Awards ==
Year	Category	Nominee(s)	Result	Ref.
2000	Best Original Song	"Blame Canada" (from South Park: Bigger, Longer & Uncut)	Nominated	

== Annie Awards ==
Year	Category	Nominee(s)	Result
1998	Outstanding Animated Primetime or Late Night Television Program	South Park	Nominated
2013	Best General Audience Animated Television Production	Raising the Bar	Nominated
2013	Outstanding Writing in an Animated Television or Other Broadcast Venue Production	Trey Parker for Jewpacabra	Won
2026	Best TV/Media – Mature	South Park	Nominated

== Behind the Voice Actors Awards ==
Year	Category	Nominee(s)	Result
2015	Best Female Lead Vocal Performance in a Television Series - Comedy/Musical	April Stewart	Nominated

== Critics' Choice Television Awards ==
Year	Category	Nominee(s)	Result
2015	Best Animated Series	South Park	Nominated
2016	Best Animated Series	South Park	Nominated
2017	Best Animated Series	South Park	Nominated
2019	Best Animated Series	South Park	Nominated
2025	Best Animated Series	South Park	Won

== Peabody Awards ==
Year	Category	Nominee(s)	Result
2005	South Park		Won

== People's Choice Awards ==
Year	Category	Nominee(s)	Result
2009	Favorite Animated Comedy	South Park	Nominated
2015	Favorite Animated Program	South Park	Nominated
2016	Favorite Animated Program	South Park	Nominated
2017	Favorite Animated Program	South Park	Nominated

== Producers Guild of America Awards ==
Year	Category	Nominee(s)	Result
2025	Danny Thomas Award for Outstanding Producer of Episodic Television, Comedy	South Park	Nominated

== Satellite Awards ==
Year	Category	Nominee(s)	Result
2005	Best DVD Release of TV Shows	South Park (season 6)	Nominated

== Teen Choice Awards ==
Year	Category	Nominee(s)	Result
1999	Choice TV: Comedy Show	South Park	Nominated
2006	Choice TV Show: Animated	South Park	Nominated
2007	Choice TV Show: Animated	South Park	Nominated
2008	Choice TV Show: Animated	South Park	Nominated
2009	Choice TV Show: Animated	South Park	Nominated
2010	Choice TV Show: Animated	South Park	Nominated

== Television Critics Association Award ==
Year	Category	Nominee(s)	Result
1998	Outstanding Program of the Year	South Park	Nominated
1998	Outstanding New Program	South Park	Nominated
2014	Heritage Award	South Park	Nominated
