= Cash for gold =

Cash for gold may refer to:

- Gold jewelry recycling, a service buying old, broken, or mismatched gold jewelry by local or online gold buyers; see Gold as an investment § Gold jewelry recycling
- "Cash for Gold" (South Park), an episode of the American animated sitcom South Park
- Cash4Gold, a mail-in refinery that buys gold, silver and platinum primarily from jewelry
