= Butterballs (South Park) =

- South Park episode
- Episode no.: Season 16; Episode 5
- Directed by: Trey Parker
- Written by: Trey Parker
- Production code: 1605
- Original air date: April 11, 2012

Episode chronology
← Previous "Jewpacabra"	Next → "I Should Have Never Gone Ziplining"
- South Park season 16

"Butterballs" is the fifth episode of the sixteenth season of the American animated sitcom South Park, and the 228th episode of the series overall. It aired on Comedy Central in the United States on April 11, 2012.

The episode spoofs the director Jason Russell, the 2011 film Bully, and the anti-bullying movement.

== Plot ==
When Butters Stotch's schoolmates see him with a black eye, they learn that it was the work of a bully who stole his lunch money for the third day in a row. Stan Marsh and Kyle Broflovski urge Butters to talk to his family, including his grandmother, whom they mention is visiting him this week. However, his grandmother turns out to be the one who bullies him. Eventually, someone secretly contacts Bucky Bailey, an anti-bullying counselor from Bully Buckers, to come to the school. Bailey obliges Mr. Mackey into calling for an assembly, at which he proposes that the students make an anti-bullying video. When no one volunteers to be the leader of the campaign and direct a music video, he starts insulting the assembled students. Stan Marsh volunteers, saying that bullying is a problem that needs to be addressed.

Stan's campaign is "Make Bullying Kill Itself" which features a video with Cartman dressed in drag and Butters himself paraded in front of everyone in the nude. When Butters expresses reluctance to continue, saying that this will only make things worse, Stan fails to take his viewpoint seriously. As a result, Kyle walks off the project, accusing Stan of virtue signalling by making himself the focus of the project instead of the issue and cautions him not to end up "naked and jacking it in San Diego", a reference that Stan does not understand.

Stan informs Butters that a Hollywood studio wants to buy the video. Though Stan is cheered by his schoolmates, Bailey corners Stan in the school boys' room, berating him because Stan sold the movie without consulting him, as revenue from the video, which was Bailey's idea, could have brought national exposure to Bully Buckers™. This upsets Stan, who soon breaks down in tears. Later, Mick Jabs, the president of the studio that purchased the video, corners Bailey in the school boys' room, and presents a cease and desist order from his lawyers, threatening to sue him if he licenses the video again.

Stan and Butters go on The Dr. Oz Show to promote the movie, but as Dr. Oz continuously tries to pry Butters of his dark secrets in an effort to get him to reveal specifics, Butters finally snaps and physically attacks Oz. Afterwards, Jabs excoriates Stan because the country did not see Butters as a bully victim, but as a violent psychopath. Soon Jabs himself is cornered in a restroom by Jesus, who threatens him with Hell for his behavior if he does not apologize for his hurtful remark regarding the failed taping.

Later that night, Butters goes to his grandmother's room as she lies in bed, telling her that he finally stood up for himself. While he admits that it felt good, it ultimately left with him a dark and empty feeling, just as he imagines she feels. He then tells her that he has realized that bullies will always exist, and while such stages in life seem as if they will last forever to kids, one day he will grow into a happy adult, and as she lies dying in a hospital, he will visit her to show her that he is still alive and happy, while she will die the same empty, sad person she has always been.

The next day, Stan is pilloried by students and teachers at school for humiliating them, as well as Jabs' studio canceling its distribution of the video, and a lawsuit that Dr. Oz has filed against Stan and South Park Elementary. Stan resolves to go to San Diego just as Kyle warned him he would where he has a mental breakdown, strips off his clothes, masturbates and dances naked in public, à la Jason Russell.

== Critical reception ==
Max Nicholson of IGN gave the episode a 7.5 "Good" rating, lauding the reveal of Butters' grandmother as the bully, and finding her verbal abuse of Butters to be "priceless". Though the bathroom gag was more disappointing than Nicholson thought it would be, Nicholson felt that the scenes with Butters and his grandmother tied the episode together, in particular his final "moment of clarity" speech. Nicholson also enjoyed Stan's nude dance in San Diego, not knowing it was a reference to the Jason Russell scandal. Nicholson was less impressed by the students' music video, as he did not initially know that it was a nod to an anti-bullying music video made at Cypress Ranch High School, which he thought was too obscure a reference, marring the episode somewhat.

Carl Cortez of Assignment X gave the episode a B+, calling their take on school bullying "hilarious", and saying of the interaction between Butters and his grandmother, "It’s brilliant and funny and wrong, but the best South Park's always are."

== Legacy ==
Four months after the episode released, the ending musical number "Jackin' It in San Diego" was released on iTunes under Comedy Central Records. For Record Store Day 2013, the song was released as "San Diego" on a 7-inch vinyl picture disc single, with the song "Gay Fish" from the episode "Fishsticks" as the B-side.

"Jackin' It in San Diego" was performed by Trey Parker and Matt Stone along with the bands Primus and Ween for the South Park: The 25th Anniversary Concert at Red Rocks Amphitheater in 2022 and released as part of a triple LP for Record Store Day 2024.
