= I Should Have Never Gone Ziplining =

- South Park episode
- From left to right: Stan, Kyle, Cartman, and Kenny, as depicted in the live-action "reenactment"
- Episode no.: Season 16; Episode 6
- Directed by: Trey Parker
- Written by: Trey Parker
- Production code: 1606
- Original air date: April 18, 2012

Guest appearances
- Eric Meyers as Narrator; Michael Zazarino as live-action Stan Marsh; Eli Bildner as live-action Kyle Broflovski; Brandon Hardesty as live-action Eric Cartman; Josh Beren as live-action Kenny McCormick

Episode chronology
| ← Previous "Butterballs" | Next → "Cartman Finds Love" |
- South Park season 16

"I Should Have Never Gone Ziplining" is the sixth episode of the sixteenth season of the American animated sitcom South Park, and the 229th episode overall. It was aired on Comedy Central in the United States on April 18, 2012 and is rated TV-MA L. The episode, which parodies reality shows such as Animal Planet's I Shouldn't Be Alive, depicts the four main characters on a trip to Colorado Mountains, where their attempts at ziplining are met with unexpected turns. The episode is narrated by Eric Meyers, who also provides the narration for I Shouldn't Be Alive.

== Plot ==
As Kenny, Stan, Kyle, and Cartman try to decide what to do on the last day of spring break, they suddenly find themselves in a unanimous agreement over a plan to try ziplining for the first time. However, the activity proves tedious, with a lot of safety briefings, small talk and very long waiting and traveling times. The boys decide to leave after the first descent, after which they find the ziplining experience boring; however, they are horrified after the tour guide tells them that there are 16 more ziplines on the tour.

Things get worse when Cartman, loaded with fast food from the previous night as well as sugar and caffeine from drinking excessive amounts of Mountain Dew, constantly farts; instead of stopping, he goes on to drink "Double Dew" which has twice the caffeine and sugar of Mountain Dew. After being further delayed by a free lunch of wet sandwiches, the boys use twigs to form the word "HELP" on the ground and wait. Cartman gets a diarrhea attack and tries to find a restroom; Kyle tries to persuade him to use the forest as a restroom, but Cartman claims the diarrhea would attract beavers. They both then get into an argument after Cartman blames Kyle for the ziplining idea, which Kyle denies and blames him in return. Stan, however, reveals in one of the interview scenes that excessively occur throughout, that he was the one who suggested the plan for them to go ziplining, although he was reluctant to tell his friends. Stan walks over to one of the employees to tell them that one of his friends has herpes as an excuse to leave the group, so, despite their enthusiasm with ziplining, the employee points to a nearby horse stable, and the boys eagerly head towards it. However, it turns out that the horses are used for a tour group as well and cannot go faster than four miles per hour. While the tour group stops for lunch, Kyle lies on a rock, weak with boredom (annoyed by the fact that tourists keep saying "to make a long story short" but are actually making it long). Stan notices a marina nearby, and so they decide to get a boat to try and escape. A viewer discretion warning appears, flashing to a live action sequence.

The power boat turns out to be slow as well (going five miles an hour), and the boys snap. Cartman is blamed for his diarrhea, everyone is trying to recall whose idea it was to go ziplining to begin with, except for Kenny, who does not care as he is apparently dying from a combination of boredom and herpes. Cartman defecates into the water; it attracts beavers, which the boys fight off offscreen. They then realize that falling asleep might result in their death, so in order to keep everyone awake, Kyle asks Cartman to share his drink (now "Diet Double Dew", which has half the caffeine and sugar of "Double Dew", equivalent to regular Mountain Dew), but he refuses to let Kenny touch it because he has herpes. Kenny eventually dies of boredom and the three boys end up contracting herpes from sharing it anyway. When Kyle and Cartman start arguing and blaming each other on whose idea it was to go ziplining again, Stan interrupts and confesses that he was the one who signed them up for the ziplining tour; his reason being in order to receive a free 5th generation iPod nano (which cannot be traded). Kyle and Cartman are outraged and they all have an emotional breakdown. Just as all hope seems lost, the boys are miraculously rescued by Mr. Hankey who takes them home. At this point, the live action sequence ends and reverts to its original animation format (however, the short interview scenes were still animated during the live action sequence).

In the aftermath, Kenny's body is delivered to his family. Stan and Cartman are treated for their herpes (Cartman, having previously mocked Kenny for having herpes, now claims his was a cold sore), and Kyle is hospitalized due to Cartman's feces getting stuck in his nose following Cartman's incessant flatulence. Motivated to raise awareness about the boredom risks of ziplining, Stan makes a video, but ends up "jackin' it in San Diego" à la Jason Russell again as he did in the previous episode. Cartman goes back to drinking Diet Double Dew as he is defiant to "Dew the Math".

== Reception ==
The episode received mixed reviews from critics. Marcus Gilmer of The A.V. Club said the episode had potential, but abandoning the zip-lining aspect and focusing on how bored the boys are didn't work, ultimately giving the episode a C−. Max Nicholson of IGN gave the episode a 7.5/10 "Good" rating, also saying the episode didn't reach its full potential, but stated that the episode was entertaining.
