= Planking (fad) =

2008 fad

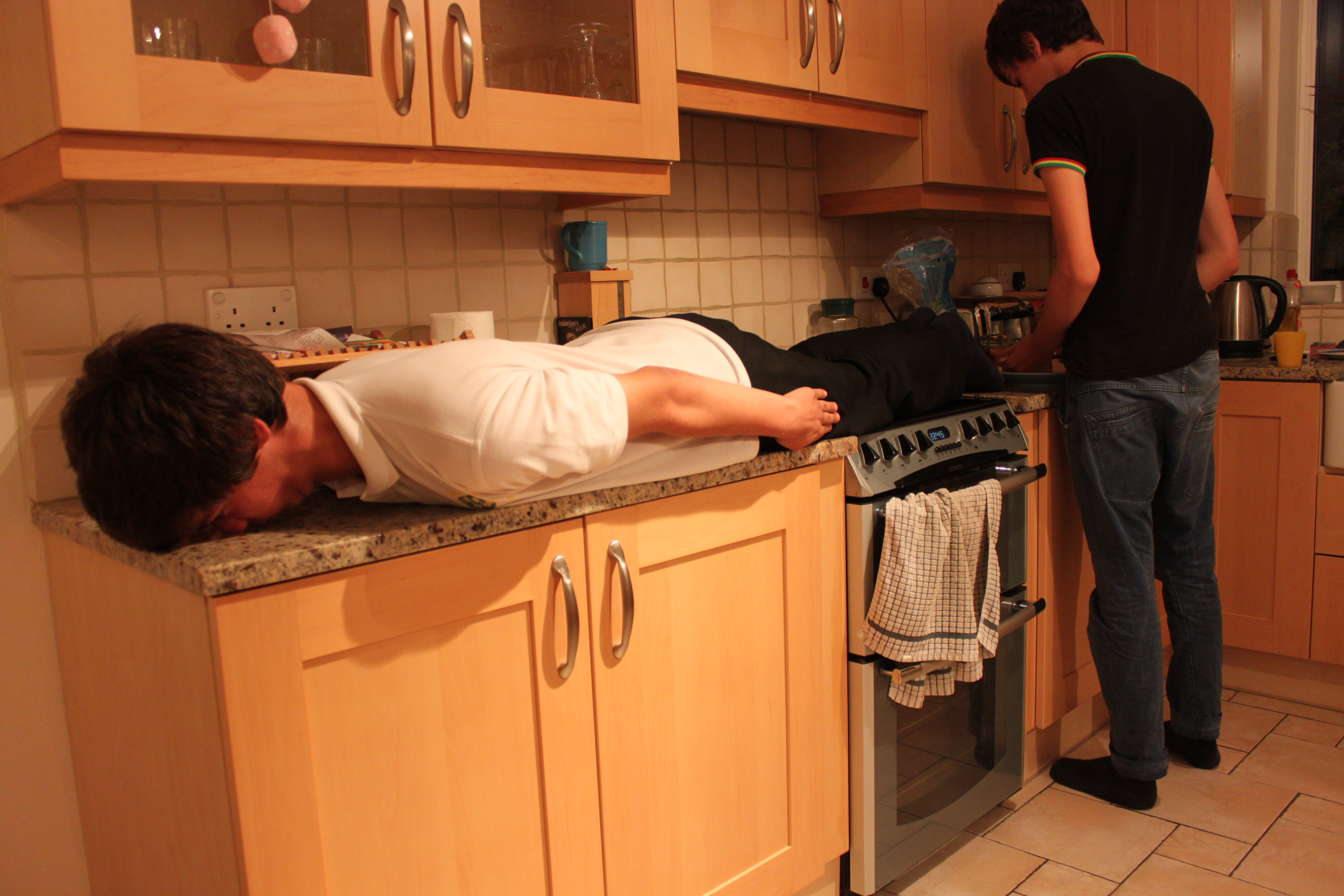
Planking in a kitchen

Planking is an activity that consists of lying expressionlessly in a face-down position, sometimes in an unusual or incongruous location. The body is kept straight and rigid, like a wooden plank, typically with the palms of the hands touching the performer's sides. Planking can include lying flat on a flat surface, or holding the body flat while it is supported in only some regions, with the rest suspended in the air.

Teenagers invented planking independently multiple times since the 1980s, with names including face dancing and the lying down game. In the late 2000s, it spread among youth in England and Australia on Facebook, leading to a global internet meme and fad peaking in 2011.

== History ==
The earliest instance of planking, called "face dancing" by its participants, occurred in 1983 or 1984 in Edmonds, Washington, by Scott Amy and Joel Marshall. The two high school age boys were walking in a park when they came upon a baseball game. They spontaneously decided to lie face down in right field to see if anyone would react. (Note: Amy and Marshall do not remember which of them first had the idea.) The two were left undisturbed through several innings before nonchalantly getting up and leaving.

In 1986, a group of alumni from Amy and Marshall's high school planked at a disco party in Berlin, starting a trend documented with photographs in Der Spiegel. In 1994, Tom Green filmed a prank for The Tom Green Show where he laid on an Ottawa sidewalk in a manner similar to planking. The prank was cut and never aired.

In 1997, two school boys in Taunton, England, started lying face-down in public places to amuse themselves and baffle onlookers. Gary Clarkson (then aged 15) and Christian Langdon (then aged 12) called it the "lying down game". As Clarkson put it, "It was just a really stupid, random thing to do". The Lying Down Game remained within Clarkson's and Langdon's circle of friends until 2007, when their friend Daniel Hoppin created a Facebook page for the new trend. Hoppin said, "We began a Facebook group to see who could get the craziest photo".

The term "planking" was coined by Sam Weckert, Darcy McCann and Kym Berry of Adelaide, South Australia: "Planking was a term myself and two other mates came up with in the summer of 2008". Weckert created a Facebook fan page to share "planking" photos. After reports of the practice started appearing in the Australian media, it grew rapidly and the meme became a global phenomenon. After reports of the craze in the British media in 2009, Planking spread to the rest of the world. Worldwide it has also been known as "extreme lying down" (2008, Australasia), "facedowns" (2010, USA and Ireland), and "planking" (2011, Australia, New Zealand and worldwide). In the years following its explosion in popularity, several variations on planking have proliferated, some inspired by the fad, and others that have arisen independently.

Planking has been compared with an earlier fad, "limp falling", popularized by Western Australian cartoonist Paul Rigby and practised at his favorite watering hole, the Palace Hotel, Perth. A Limp Falling Club developed among Perth's arts community.

== Controversies ==
The popularity of planking generated backlash. Some people disapproved of the more objectionable photos that had circulated, such as a girl planking with her head in a toilet or a woman planking on a stripper pole. Planking in dangerous places also resulted in many injuries and at least one death.

=== Notable incidents ===
- The planking fad made news in September 2009, when seven accident and emergency staff working at the Great Western Hospital in Swindon, England, were suspended for playing the "lying down game" during a night shift and posting photos to Facebook. They were considered to have breached health and safety and infection control regulations.
- On 15 May 2011, Acton Beale, a 20-year-old man, plunged to his death after reportedly "planking" on a seventh-floor balcony in Brisbane, Australia. The Darwin Awards recognised this incident in their 2011 edition.
- On 29 May 2011, Max Key, son of New Zealand Prime Minister John Key, uploaded to Facebook a photograph of himself planking on a lounge suite, his father standing behind him. Afterwards, the photograph was reproduced on the front page of the New Zealand Herald. Confirming that the photograph was indeed genuine, John Key remarked that he didn't see anything wrong with planking when done safely. Key was criticised for his appearance in the photograph, with some going as far as to comment that he "killed" the meme.
- On 2 September 2011, Dwight Howard and about 100 of his fans planked in Beijing, China, as part of a promotional Adidas campaign.
- On 20 January 2012, Pat Barry planked on television after a mixed martial arts match in which he won a knockout victory over his opponent.

== In popular culture ==
- The fall 2011 season premiere of the U.S. version of The Office featured several employees planking in the parking lots, the restroom, on desks, and on top of file cabinets.
- American hip hop artists Kanye West and Jay-Z reference planking in their 2011 single "Gotta Have It".
- In "Faith Hilling", the 28 March 2012 episode of the animated American TV series South Park, trends such as planking are parodied.
- Regina Spektor planks multiple times in her 2012 music video for "Don't Leave Me (Ne Me Quitte Pas)".
- In the 2014 animated film Mr. Peabody and Sherman, Mr. Peabody, the talking genius dog, claims to have invented planking.
- On 6 July 2019, Israel Adesanya referenced planking in a commentary of UFC 239: Jones vs. Santos after Jorge Masvidal delivered the fastest knockout in UFC history.

== Gallery ==
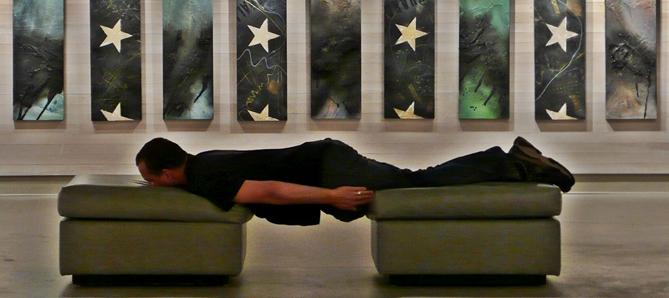
Planking across a gap between cushion-seats

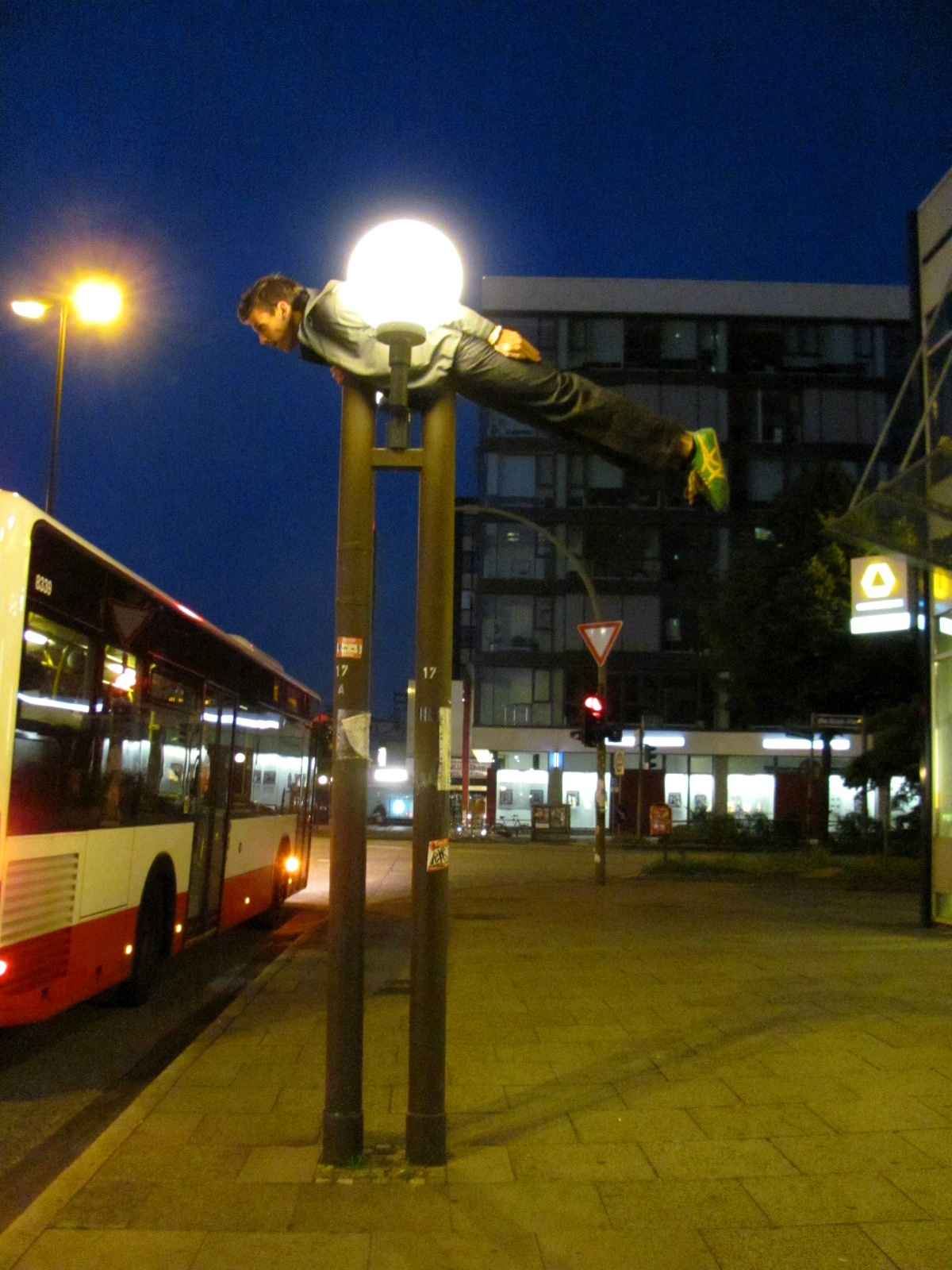
Planking the street lights

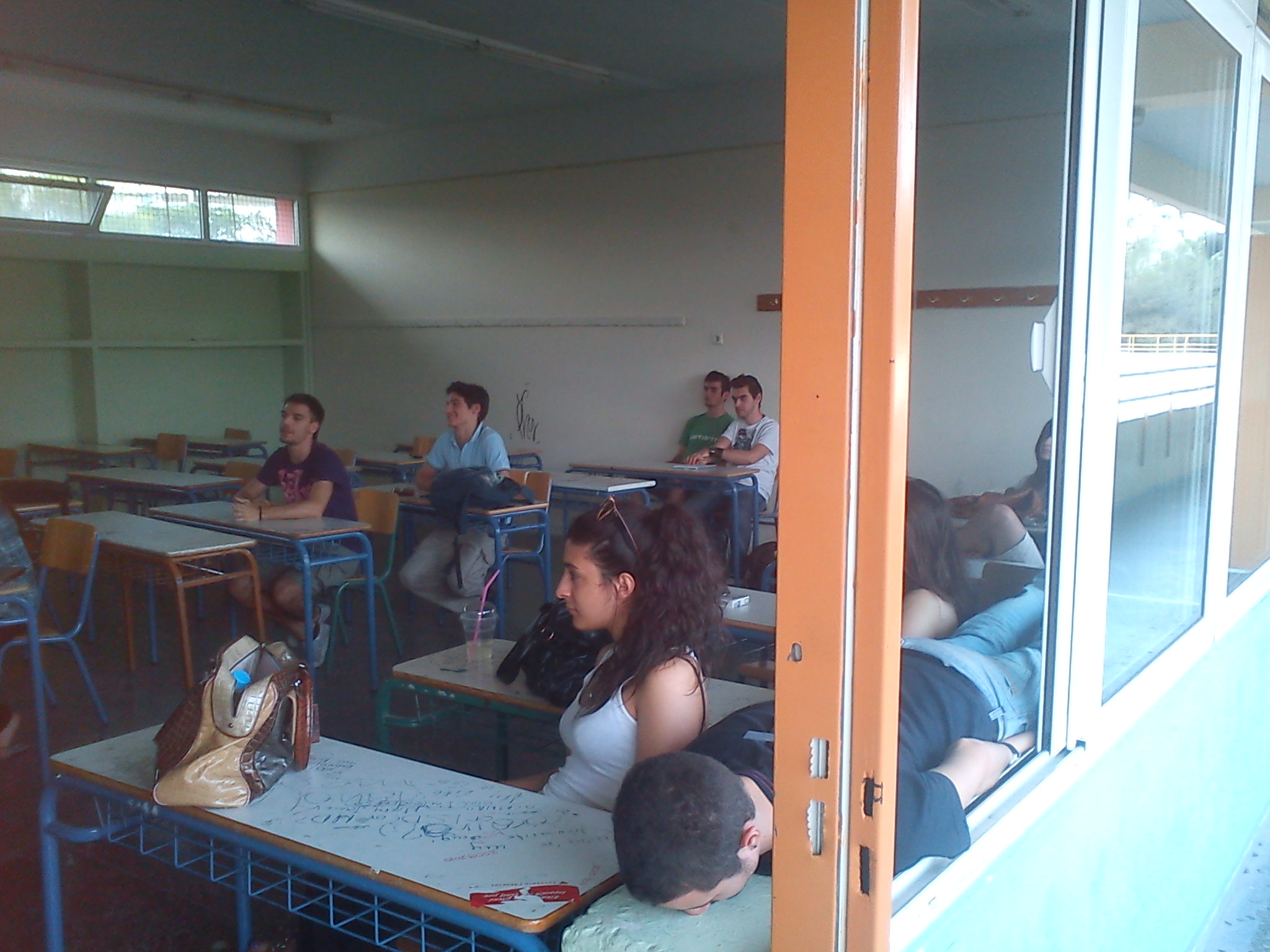
Classroom planking

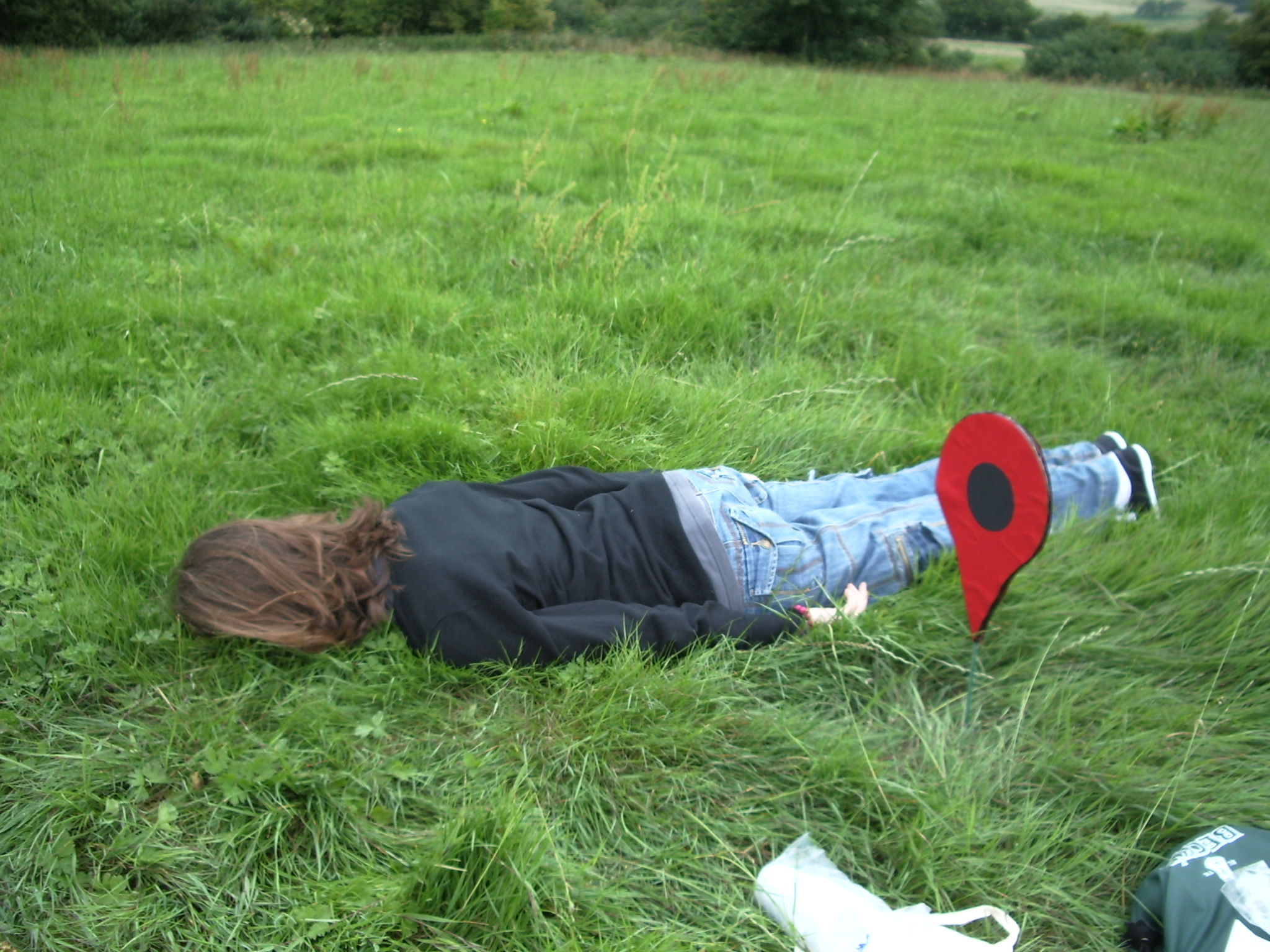
Planking at a geohash

== Similar fads ==
- Teapotting consists of bending the arms into the shape of a teapot, in reference to the children's song "I'm a Little Teapot". This variation was created by teachers in Mortlake College in an attempt to create a new 'craze' after noticing the amount of attention given to planking.
- Playing Dead (known as "시체놀이" in Korean. Korean Wikipedia article.) originated in South Korea in 2003. It involves a large number of participants pretending to be dead. It was inspired by the manga character Crayon Shin-chan and is thought to have arisen independently of planking.

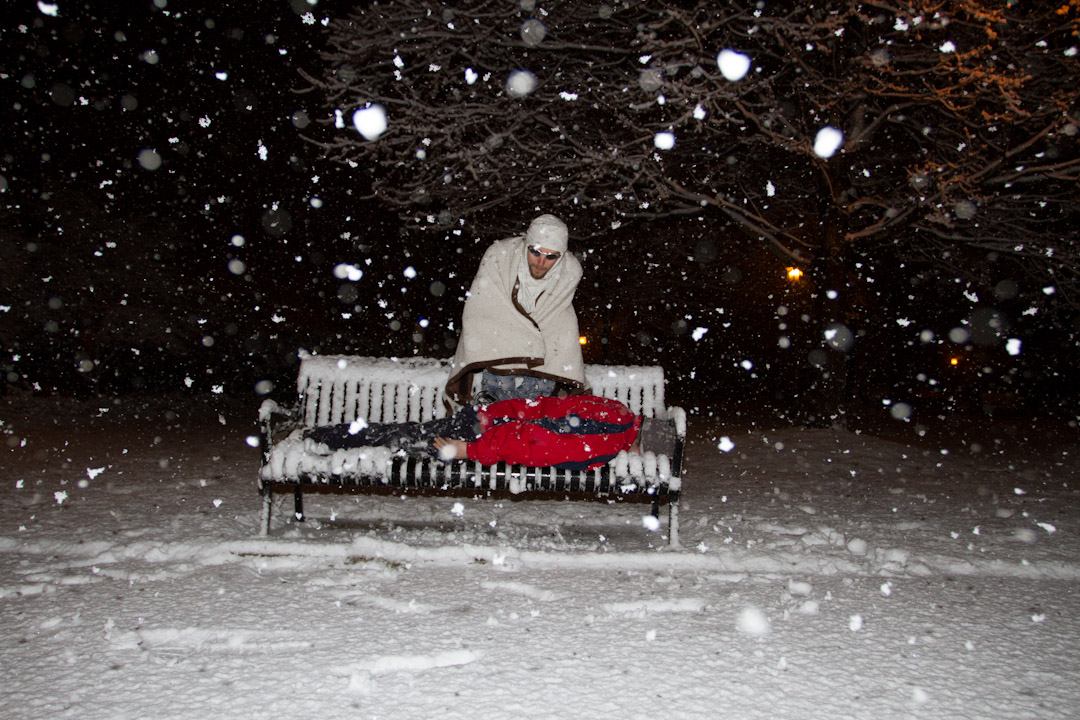
Owling (and planking) in the snow

- Owling is a variation on planking in which a person squats "like an owl" in a populated but unusual area. Participants commonly make noises similar to an owl, to make the owl impression more realistic. It was first documented on 11 July 2011 in a post on the social news website reddit.
- Batmanning involves hanging upside down by the feet.
- Dufnering is a variation of planking that involves a person lying with the bottom half of their body on the floor, the top half leaning up, their arms close to the side of their body, and their hands ending towards the bottom of their thighs. The person would also be looking straightforward. The fad began when Rory McIlroy tweeted a photo of himself imitating 2013 PGA Championship winner Jason Dufner.
