= A Nightmare on FaceTime =

- South Park episode
- Episode no.: Season 16; Episode 12
- Directed by: Trey Parker
- Written by: Trey Parker
- Based on: The Shining (Plot)
- Production code: 1612
- Original air date: October 24, 2012

Episode chronology
| ← Previous "Going Native" | Next → "A Scause for Applause" |
- South Park season 16

"A Nightmare on FaceTime" is the twelfth episode of the sixteenth season of the American animated sitcom South Park, and the 235th episode of the series overall. It premiered on Comedy Central in the United States on October 24, 2012. In the story, aspects of which parody the 1980 film The Shining, Randy Marsh purchases a Blockbuster video store and demands that his reluctant family work in it on Halloween with him.

== Plot ==
Randy Marsh announces to his family that he has purchased a Blockbuster video store outside of town for $10,000, a venture he believes will make them rich. His family is skeptical of this idea, since online video streaming and Redbox-DVD vending machines have made brick and mortar rental stores obsolete. This is illustrated by the eerie, abandoned-looking store, which houses ghosts, and which the citizens of South Park regard as a haunted house of sorts. Despite this, Randy forces his whole family to work at the store. When this precludes his son Stan from trick-or-treating with his friends, Kyle Broflovski resorts to using FaceTime on his and Stan's iPads in order for Stan to participate in the activity via telepresence. The boys dress up as the Avengers and throughout their walk, Eric Cartman becomes infuriated when people fail to recognize that he is dressed as the Hulk (which he blames instead on Stan's FaceTiming). When the boys see a convenience store being robbed, they charge into the store, playing the roles of superheroes. But when they see that it's being robbed by a group of thugs called the Redbox Killers, and that the Killers have murdered the store clerk, the boys flee. In so doing, they lose Kyle's iPad and a flyer for a Halloween party called the Monster Mash. The Redbox Killers find the iPad and flyer, torture Stan virtually, and learn that the boys are going to the Monster Mash. The Killers dump the iPad in a field before heading to the Monster Mash to silence the boys as witnesses.

Meanwhile, as the Blockbuster Video fails to attract customers, a desperate Randy begins to deteriorate. He experiences a vision of an old Blockbuster employee who warns him that the store will never succeed as long as Sharon and Stan's negative attitudes hinder it, and that Randy must do something "extreme" about them. He then begins wandering the store menacingly, stalking Sharon and Stan, oblivious to the sight of his daughter, Shelley, setting fire to the store.

The boys report the Redbox Killers' crime to the police and are later reunited with Stan after Kyle's iPad is found and brought to the hospital. The police devise a plan to capture the Redbox Killers by sending one of their own, Peterson, into the Monster Mash as "GangnamStein", a portmanteau of Frankenstein's monster and "Gangnam Style" singer Psy. They use Kyle's iPad as GangnamStein's head, with the telepresent Stan providing navigation to Peterson. At one point, Randy commandeers Stan's iPad, sending Peterson on a rampage through town, resulting in him being fatally shot by the police, who realize too late that they killed Peterson and not a monster. The Redbox Killers are also captured. Stan "dies" when the iPad runs out of power. The following morning, after the Blockbuster store has burned down, Sharon finds Randy half-frozen in the snow but still alive—and tells him that they will be able to recover some of their money from the insurance company. Before she and Stan leave to get lunch, Stan sets his iPad to stream a movie and places it in Randy's hands.

== Reception ==
The episode received positive reviews from critics. Ryan McGee of The A.V. Club gave the episode a B rating, enjoying most aspects of the episode but ultimately stated the episode wasn't as "classic" as it could've been. Max Nicholson of IGN gave the episode an 8.6/10 "Great" rating, saying "this week's South Park delivered an admirable riff on The Shining, as well as some spot-on streaming media commentary".
