= Sarcastaball =

- South Park episode
- Episode no.: Season 16; Episode 8
- Directed by: Trey Parker
- Written by: Trey Parker
- Production code: 1608
- Original air date: September 26, 2012

Episode chronology
← Previous "Cartman Finds Love"	Next → "Raising the Bar"
- South Park season 16

"Sarcastaball" is the eighth episode of the sixteenth season of the American animated television series South Park, and the 231st episode of the series overall. It premiered on Comedy Central in the United States on September 26, 2012, and is rated TV-MA L. In the episode, Randy Marsh, concerned over drastic changes to elementary school football, inadvertently creates a new version of the game after uttering a sarcastic public remark, which quickly becomes the nation's most popular sport. As a result, Butters Stotch becomes a star athlete in the pastime, while Randy finds that he has lost the ability to speak without sarcasm.

The episode references the controversial calls of replacement referees in a September 24, 2012 Green Bay Packers–Seattle Seahawks NFL game, and spoofs musician Cee Lo Green, the debate over concussions in American football, sports talk personality Jim Rome, and NFL players Peyton Manning and LaMarr Woodley.

== Plot ==
When Randy Marsh is watching a Broncos game on TV, he learns from Stan that kickoffs have been banned from elementary school football due to fears of serious injury. He protests this at a PTA meeting and sarcastically suggests implementing a ridiculously safe new game called Sarcastaball. In that sport, the boys wear bras and tinfoil hats, use a balloon instead of a ball, and give hugs and compliments to the opposing team instead of tackling them. Despite the sarcastic tone with which Randy makes this statement (and with which he speaks almost exclusively throughout the episode), the PTA takes this idea literally, and implements it, making Randy coach of the South Park Elementary team. Although Stan and his friends are skeptical about Sarcastaball, Butters proves to be a morale booster for his team, telling them that they must draw upon their "creamy center" where the "happy, loving goo" sits that allows them to be good to others. The nation's youth so embrace Sarcastaball over football that a National Sarcastaball League is created, and Marsh is made the coach of the Denver Broncos, complete with sarcastic cheerleaders and sarcastic halftime performers. When this takes him away from coaching South Park Elementary, the team makes Butters team captain.

When Cartman tells Butters that his inability to be nice to people makes him a poor Sarcastaball player, Butters tells him that everyone has a creamy goo inside them that can make them good to others. Butters shows Cartman a closet filled of jars of this "goo", which turns out to be semen that he has stored from his nocturnal emissions, some of which he has Cartman and the other players ingest, not knowing what it is, in order to improve their game. This tactic spreads until a popular sports drink made of Butters' semen is publicly marketed as "Butters' Creamy Goo" and endorsed by professional players.

Meanwhile, after Randy's wife, Sharon, expresses to Randy her concern that he has become unable to speak without being sarcastic, they consult a doctor, who tells them that sarcasm has caused Randy irreversible brain damage. Randy then goes to his son's Sarcastaball game to plead with the crowd that sarcasm, and the game based on it, is dangerous. Stan and Cartman tell Randy that when Butters says that competitiveness can be compassionate, he is not being sarcastic, but entirely sincere, and that Randy is simply too grumpy to consider that the game can be played sincerely. When Stan gives Randy some of the "sports drink" to boost his feelings of caring and goodness, Randy realizes it is semen. As a result, Butters is grounded for having others consume his semen despite being unaware of what semen and sarcasm actually are. When Butters subsequently experiences an erection, his father, Stephen tells him it is a "friendly compass" that informs him when friends are near, and that it is pointing up to heaven, because Jesus is his friend.

== Critical reception ==
Michael O'Brien of Screen Invasion praised the episode's criticism of the September 2012 replacement referee controversy, observing that the series' timing enables it to produce episodes that are relevant, though he opined that the running sarcasm dialogue "runs tedious at about the halfway point" and "teeter-totters on the line of hit and miss". O'Brien nonetheless stated that he laughed out loud during the Butters storyline.

Lindsey Bahr of SplitSider speculated that a football-themed episode was already in production when the September 24, 2012 referee controversy occurred two days prior to the episode's premiere, and that the producers added a reference to it after the fact. Bahr was impressed at the producers' ability to be "masterful at restraint" by restricting themselves to a mere single joke about the incident and moving on with the episode's other themes. Bahr felt that the series' formula of dividing the children and the parents, rather than the boys, worked well in the episode, stating that the comedy is heightened when the children are presented as such, with knowledge gaps and blind trust with regard to the adults' activities.

Max Nicholson of IGN thought the episode's topical humor, double entendre and juvenile running gags gave it the potential to be a classic, but that it was clear the show was "scrambling to make ends meet in certain areas." In particular, Nicholson found Butters' B-story weaker than Randy's, claiming that after the third or fourth repetition the joke had lost its impact. However, he still found that Randy kept the episode from becoming disappointing, and concludes that despite its weaker points, Randy's story made the episode "assuredly succeed."

Carter Dotson of TV Fanatic, while conceding he "wanted to throw up at times" while watching the episode, found its lampooning of football "on-target", in particular its treatment of sports radio host Jim Rome and NFL Commissioner Roger Goodell, and stated that the series' ability to remain true to its characters while skewering current events results in its best episodes.
