= Faith Hilling =

- South Park episode
- Episode no.: Season 16; Episode 3
- Directed by: Trey Parker
- Written by: Trey Parker
- Production code: 1603
- Original air date: March 28, 2012

Episode chronology
← Previous "Cash for Gold"	Next → "Jewpacabra"
- South Park season 16

"Faith Hilling" is the third episode of the sixteenth season of the American animated television series South Park, and the 226th episode overall. The episode was written by series co-creator Trey Parker and is rated TV-MA L in the United States. It premiered on Comedy Central in the United States on March 28, 2012.

In the episode, the boys must deal with the fact that "Faith Hilling", the memetic trend in which they enjoy participating, is being supplanted in popularity by newer ones, including one that leads investigators to believe that cats are evolving in intelligence and have become a threat to humanity.

== Plot ==
A new memetic trend emerges called "Faith Hilling", a derivative of planking, which involves having a picture of oneself taken while pulling the front of one's shirt forward in mock resemblance of women's breasts. After the boys perform this prank on stage at a 2012 Colorado Republican Presidential Debate, the entire fourth grade class of South Park Elementary is required to take a safety education class in which Professor Lamont teaches them the dangers of memetic trends with a graphic educational video showing people dying gruesome deaths when they are hit by trains while "Tebowing". Despite this, and a report by The Denver Post that Faith Hilling is considered passé and has been replaced with the newer trend of dragging one's nude buttocks across the floor or ground, or "Taylor Swifting", Stan and his friends continue Faith Hilling, even coming into conflict with Taylor Swifters.

Professor Lamont is then informed by two unidentified men of a new Internet meme being practiced by another species: photos of cats with their heads poking through slices of bread. Lamont sees this as evidence that cats are evolving to become as intelligent as humans. As this and newer memes continue to emerge among both people and cats, which in some instances results in the deaths of participants, the boys continue Faith Hilling, but after taunts and jeers by spectators, they are eventually forced, one by one, to come to terms with the fact that doing so is no longer in style.

At the same time, Lamont and other humans attempt to communicate with the cats, which are now apparently capable of speech; the humans feel this represents a danger to mankind and will eventually lead to war between the two species.

The boys attempt to remain current by participating in newer memes, including one that combines elements from previous memes and involves dragging one's nude buttocks across the floor while holding a cat with its head poking through a slice of bread. The boys attempt to perform this stunt at another Colorado Republican debate, but after Cartman storms the stage with his cat, he finds himself unable to continue, seeing that it is beneath him to adopt a meme simply because it is new. He aborts the intended prank, and instead takes a stand by doing what he really wants. He pulls his shirt out to simulate breasts, and begins to sing a number that spurs both the crowd and the Republicans (Rick Santorum, Mitt Romney, and Newt Gingrich) to join him in a massive act of group Faith Hilling.

The episode concludes with a reporter claiming that the messages behind these latest memes is unclear, but it does not matter as long as audiences are given a song, celebrity bashing, and Republican hopefuls dancing around with breasts, a practice known as "pandering". As he goes on about the practice of "reporting", a train appears out of nowhere and immediately kills him.

== Reception ==
Eric Goldman of IGN gave the episode a 7/10 "Good" rating. Ryan McGee of The A.V. Club gave the episode a "B−".

== See also ==
- Oh Long Johnson
