= Insecurity (South Park) =

- South Park episode
- Episode no.: Season 16; Episode 10
- Directed by: Trey Parker
- Written by: Trey Parker
- Production code: 1610
- Original air date: October 10, 2012

Episode chronology
← Previous "Raising the Bar"	Next → "Going Native"
- South Park season 16

"Insecurity" is the tenth episode of the sixteenth season of the American animated sitcom South Park, and the 233rd episode of the series overall. It aired on Comedy Central in the United States on October 10, 2012.

The story concerns Kyle Broflovski's belief that his mother is having an affair with a UPS delivery man. When public suspicion falls upon the delivery man, package delivery to the neighborhood is threatened, and Eric Cartman purchases a home security system in response. The episode parodies security alarm systems, and also contains references to Amazon.com and the film The Dark Knight Rises. Multiple characters, including Cartman himself, impersonate the fictional villain Bane.

== Plot ==
Gerald Broflovski dresses up as a UPS delivery man in order to engage in sexual roleplay with his wife, Sheila. Their three-year-old son, Ike, sees this and is convinced that his mother is having an affair with a real delivery man. He draws a picture of what he saw, and tearfully shows his older brother Kyle. When Kyle confides this to the other boys at Stan Marsh's house, Stan’s father Randy Marsh overhears them, and informs the other men in town of this. Soon, all the children and men in South Park, led by Randy, are under the impression that UPS delivery men are sleeping with their wives and mothers. Around this time, Eric Cartman decides to have a home security system installed to protect his mother. However, he accidentally triggers the device and becomes infuriated with the company's nonchalant reaction.

The old mechanic at Skeeter's Bar convinces the men that the convenience of ordering products online has brought this situation upon them, relating the UPS delivery men to milk men of the 20th century. He recounts how back in his day, men got lazy and wanted to have milk delivered to their doorstep. Little did they know that the milkman delivering the milk would sleep with their wives. He says that history is now repeating itself with Amazon, with women receiving products from the e-commerce giant that they do not remember ordering. Randy then observes this phenomenon with his wife Sharon, and then finds Ike's drawing in Stan's room. Convinced that Thad, the UPS delivery man is sleeping with their wives, Randy and the men ask the old mechanic for advice. At first he states that there is no getting rid of the delivery man, not in any way they are "prepared for", but suggests they let him keep sleeping with their wives until he gets tired. Stephen, however, states that it is not just their wives anymore, believing that the UPS man is now going after the men too, as he just received a product that he does not remember ordering. The old mechanic tells them the only way to solve the problem is to kill the delivery man and resolve to return to purchase products in brick and mortar stores, stating that his generation did the same with milkmen.

The men each don Bane-type masks, severely beat up Thad, and leave Ike's drawing on him to indicate that they know what he did. When the deliveries continue, the men decide to install the Wolf Home Security personal alarm system, named "INSecurity", which is physically installed inside the user and triggered whenever the user feels insecure. This leads to rampant false alarms caused by the men's insecurities. Kyle attempts to address the issue of his mother's "affair" by having his parents sit down with the UPS delivery man. However, after Thad's UPS truck is destroyed by a bomb, he retreats deeper into the Broflovski's home before jumping out of a second-story window to his death. The men tell the police that Thad killed himself because he was a psychopath who had been forced to have sex with his mother. They purportedly illustrate this by showing the police Ike's drawing, which they say they found in the man's pocket. When the police find a UPS uniform in the Broflovski's closet, Kyle and the men realize that Gerald was the UPS man that Ike saw.

When the men inform the old mechanic that he was wrong about the trappings of modern convenience and merely need to be secure with themselves, the old man suggests that the security salesmen are having sex with their wives. As a result, Cartman and the men, again disguised as Bane, confront the security technician. The episode ends with him dragged out of his truck in shock after Cartman tells him that he should have "respected [Cartman's] authoritah".

== Production ==
"Insecurity" was developed from an idea created during meetings for the show's 2014 video game, South Park: The Stick of Truth. Parker and Stone and the team at South Park Studios had spent the summer prior to their fall run working on the video game, and one idea that came up was a character having to get into people's homes, and past their security systems. The idea got the team discussing in-home security systems, which Parker views as a "big scam" due to the rarity of the system alarming for a real emergency. Parker and Stone spoke to a close friend who is a policeman, who confirmed that they received false alarms "all the time." The United States Department of Justice estimates that between 94% and 98% of all alarm calls to law enforcement are indeed false alarms.

Several scenes were completed before the run began, with "Insecurity" set as the season premiere. Scenes scripted at this time included Cartman's dialogue back-and-forth with the security company employees, regarding his password. The storyline was still incomplete when its broadcast date neared, so they decided to wait on it for later in the season. At one point, they considered splitting the episode into a two-parter, between Cartman's battle with the security companies and the plot line regarding the postman. They decided to keep it one episode when they scripted scenes with the old man in Skeeter's Bar, feeling as though his dialogue connected the two stories enough.

Parker remarked that the episode was inspired by his own life, when he had ordered items from Amazon.com, only to forget what it is when it arrives. Likening the surprise to Christmas morning, he noted in the episode's DVD commentary he has a tendency to order random items when South Park episodes are near completion: "I [order items] the most on Tuesday nights, when we're approving animation like crazy, it's like three in the morning, I'll just get on the computer and start ordering shit from Amazon […] just to make Thursday [its arrival date] like Christmas."

== Cultural references ==
The episode references Bane, a character within the Batman universe, specifically, his depiction by actor Tom Hardy in the 2012 film The Dark Knight Rises. It also references UPS and Amazon.com.

== Reception ==
Ryan McGee of The A.V. Club gave the episode a B, writing that the episode "did its best to link up the fear of cuckoldry with the fear of home invasion, but the results themselves were mixed." Max Nicholson of IGN called the episode an "admirable entry" for the season, though noting "While the plot here was clearly framed around recycling these two jokes over and over, they were both strong enough to carry out the 22 minutes in full."
