= Going Native =

- South Park episode
- Episode no.: Season 16; Episode 11
- Directed by: Trey Parker
- Written by: Trey Parker
- Production code: 1611
- Original air date: October 17, 2012

Episode chronology
← Previous "Insecurity"	Next → "A Nightmare on FaceTime"
- South Park season 16

"Going Native" is the eleventh episode of the sixteenth season of the American animated sitcom South Park, and the 234th episode of the series overall. It premiered on Comedy Central in the United States on October 17, 2012. In the episode, when Butters starts acting out at school, he learns that he was not born in South Park. He and Kenny journey to Butters' homeland for his coming of age ceremony.

The episode was written by series co-creator Trey Parker and is rated TV-MA in the United States, excluding syndication and post-2017 reruns on Comedy Central, where the episode is rated TV-14-DLSV instead.

== Plot ==
Butters Stotch begins acting out at school, after beating up a fellow student Scott Malkinson seemingly without provocation, and then later excoriating his male classmates for being stuck-up and disingenuous (save for Kenny McCormick, who he says is the only one who has any sense of dignity). When his parents learn of his increased anger, they explain to Butters that they are originally from Hawaii, that Butters is undergoing a biological stage that is similar to the instinct that compels salmon to migrate, and that he must make a solitary journey to his birthplace, to participate in a ceremony called hapanoa. They tell him that he is Hawaiian royalty, as his grandparents were in Hawaii at the time of "The King", and give him a "Mahalo Rewards Card" to assist him in completing his journey. When Kyle Broflovski and the others hear that Butters is leaving, they urge Kenny, who is perceived to be Butters' "best friend" on account of Butters' prior remark, to stop him, but Kenny ends up going with him.

When the two boys arrive at Kauai, they are greeted by a group of "native Hawaiians" (who turn out to be simply White Americans owning timeshares there), who take them to their chief, David. They are acquainted with Butters' parents, and use the Mahalo Rewards Card to receive discounts as Hawaiian residents. They call Butters Keiki, and introduce him to their drink, chi chi. Butters' hapanoa is interrupted, however, by the news that the Mahalo Rewards Card is being eliminated, and that their points will no longer be accepted. The "natives" fear this will eliminate any distinction between them and the mainlanders, or "haoles", whom they intend to fight. Soon a war erupts between the "natives" and the U.S. Coast Guard, beginning with Butters sinking a cruise ship with a golf ball. The Coast Guard nearly bring them to surrender by cutting off their supply of chi chi. Meanwhile, Kenny encounters the ghost of Elvis Presley at the abandoned Coco Palms Resort, who shows him a hidden trove of chi chi. Kenny brings this treasure back to the "natives", whose fighting spirit is renewed. The U.S. government decides to reinstate the Mahalo Rewards Card, and both Butters and Kenny are allowed to complete the hapanoa together. When asked if his anger has subsided, Butters admits that he is still jealous of Ben Affleck, who he says is very handsome, married to Jennifer Lopez, and a good film director. When informed that Affleck is now married to Jennifer Garner, Butters' anger is assuaged, and he walks happily off into the sunset with Kenny.

== Production ==
According to the DVD commentary, the idea of Butters needing to go back to his homeland is based on the Star Trek episode "Amok Time", as well as the "going native" format films, the most recent being Avatar. Hawaii was chosen as the setting as Parker lives there for parts of the year. A big issue while writing the episode was to avoid focusing on the "native Hawaiians" owning timeshares, since that was a major plot device in the sixth-season episode "Asspen".

== Reception ==
Marcus Gilmer of The A.V. Club gave the episode a "B−", writing that the episode "gets too far away from the characters at its center." Max Nicholson of IGN gave the episode a 6.3, faulting it for relying solely on one recurring joke, the "Native Hawaiians", opining that it was not broad enough for mass appeal. Nicholson noted that the episode "had its moments, but ultimately didn't deliver the impact that was needed.."

Michael Keany, writing for Honolulu magazine described the episode as "a surprisingly nuanced satire" of life on the islands and the attitudes of new and part-time residents, pointing out that "everyone who's ever lived here for any length of time could recognize the arrogance, the cultural co-opting, the easy entitlement."
