= South Park season 16 =

Season of television series

South Park
- Season 16
- Home media release cover
- No. of episodes: 14

Release
- Original network: Comedy Central
- Original release: March 14 – November 7, 2012

Season chronology
- ← Previous; Season 15 Next → Season 17

The sixteenth season of the American adult animated sitcom South Park began airing on Comedy Central on March 14, 2012 and ended on November 7, 2012. It was also the final season to consist of 14 episodes, as well as the last season until Season 25 to have its episodes air in the first half of the year. Parker was the director and writer for all episodes.

== Episodes ==
No. overall	No. in season	Title	Directed by	Written by	Original release date	Prod. code	U.S. viewers (millions)
224	1	"Reverse Cowgirl"	Trey Parker	Trey Parker	March 14, 2012	1601	2.63
When Clyde's mother dies after falling in the toilet (due to Clyde leaving the toilet seat up), the government hires TSA agents to patrol anyone and everyone who goes to the bathroom with a belt attached to the toilet. Meanwhile, Stan convinces Clyde to sue the inventor of the toilet, so he employs a lawyer who conducts a sueance (séance) that will allow this to happen.
225	2	"Cash for Gold"	Trey Parker	Trey Parker	March 21, 2012	1602	2.31
Cartman launches a gemstones network show and creates a very lucrative business. Stan searches for the real value of a piece of jewelry that was a gift from his grandfather. Meanwhile, Cartman's lucrative new business preys upon an extremely vulnerable clientele.
226	3	"Faith Hilling"	Trey Parker	Trey Parker	March 28, 2012	1603	2.70
The boys get into meme photography, but become discouraged and conflicted after learning that the meme they tried to perform at the Republican National Convention has been supplanted in popularity by newer ones, including one that leads investigators to believe that cats are evolving in intelligence and have become a threat to humanity.
227	4	"Jewpacabra"	Trey Parker	Trey Parker	April 4, 2012	1604	2.69
South Park's big Easter egg hunt is in jeopardy when Cartman spreads rumors of a dangerous beast lurking in the woods nearby, but Cartman finds that spreading these ideas may come to endanger him.
228	5	"Butterballs"	Trey Parker	Trey Parker	April 11, 2012	1605	2.23
Stan wants to raise awareness about the dangers of bullying by shooting an anti-bullying video, while Butters falls victim to his grandmother's extremely cruel abuse.
229	6	"I Should Have Never Gone Ziplining"	Trey Parker	Trey Parker	April 18, 2012	1606	2.43
The boys spend the day in the Colorado Mountains learning how to zipline, which turns into a fight for survival as they find ziplining so boring that it proves fatal.
230	7	"Cartman Finds Love"	Trey Parker	Trey Parker	April 25, 2012	1607	2.33
When a new black girl named Nichole comes to South Park Elementary, Cartman, thinking that blacks belong together, tries to play matchmaker with her and Token. When he learns that the girl has a crush on Kyle, Cartman spreads a rumor about Kyle in order to maneuver Token and Nichole together.
231	8	"Sarcastaball"	Trey Parker	Trey Parker	September 26, 2012	1608	1.84
Randy's sarcastic protests over attempts to make football safer leads to the creation of a new sport, Sarcastaball, and an unusual tactic on the part of Butters to improve the South Park team's morale.
232	9	"Raising the Bar"	Trey Parker	Trey Parker	October 3, 2012	1609	1.69
Cartman finally realizes he is fat and decides to do something about it: get a mobility scooter. With so many fat people on scooter chairs and Honey Boo Boo being a TV star, James Cameron believes the societal bar has been lowered too much, so he goes on a deep sea expedition to find the bar and raise it.
233	10	"Insecurity"	Trey Parker	Trey Parker	October 10, 2012	1610	2.33
After Ike witnesses his parents engaging in sexual roleplay, the men in the town come to believe that their wives are sleeping with UPS delivery men. Meanwhile, Cartman gets a security system for his house, but it is angered by the nonchalant responses of the agents who respond to its alerts.
234	11	"Going Native"	Trey Parker	Trey Parker	October 17, 2012	1611	1.98
When Butters starts becoming extremely aggressive and rude, his parents tell him that he is a native Hawaiian, and must journey to that island to take part in an adolescent rite of passage. When he goes there with Kenny, he becomes embroiled in a conflict between the Hawaiians and the mainland U.S.
235	12	"A Nightmare on FaceTime"	Trey Parker	Trey Parker	October 24, 2012	1612	1.89
In this parody of Stephen King’s The Shining, Randy buys a Blockbuster Video store in the hopes of reviving the video rental business, but the obsolete business drives him mad. Meanwhile, the boys, dressed as the Avengers (including an in absentia Stan using his iPad's FaceTime) go trick or treating, and come face to face with a gang of serial killers.
236	13	"A Scause for Applause"	Trey Parker	Trey Parker	October 31, 2012	1613	1.96
When the public comes to believe that Jesus performed his miracles because he was using drugs, they cease wearing their "What would Jesus do?" wristbands, but Stan controversially refuses to take off his bracelet, which leads to both criticism and the creation of a new movement dedicated to nonconformity.
237	14	"Obama Wins!"	Trey Parker	Trey Parker	November 7, 2012	1614	2.19
Eric Cartman hides swing state ballots from the 2012 U.S. Presidential election, in a plot that involves Barack Obama, the Chinese government, the Walt Disney Company and the future of both the election and upcoming Star Wars sequels.

== See also ==
- South Park (Park County, Colorado)
- South Park City
