= Jim Rome =

American broadcaster (born 1964)

- Born: James Phillip Rome; October 14, 1964 (age 61); Los Angeles, California, U.S.
- Presenting career
- Show: The Jim Rome Show
- Stations: Westwood One; X, FAST, YouTube (simulcast)
- Time slot: 3:00 p.m. to 6:00 p.m. ET Monday–Friday
- Style: Sports radio
- Country: United States
- Website: The Jim Rome Show

James Phillip Rome (born October 14, 1964) is an American sports radio host. His talk show, The Jim Rome Show, is syndicated by Westwood One. Broadcasting from a studio near Los Angeles, Rome hosts The Jim Rome Show on radio. He has hosted TV shows on ESPN, TSN2 (in Canada), Showtime and CBS.

As of 2008 The Jim Rome Show was tied for the No. 21 most listened to talk radio show in the U.S. and Rome was the No. 29 most influential talk radio personality according to Talkers Magazine.

== Personal life ==
Rome was born in Los Angeles and graduated from Calabasas High School in Calabasas, California in 1982. He earned a degree in communications from the University of California, Santa Barbara (UCSB) in 1987. He and his wife, Janet, live in Irvine, California with their two sons, Jake and Logan.

== Broadcasting career ==
Rome started his radio career at college radio station KCSB-FM while at UCSB, where he was sports director for one quarter, and at news station KTMS, also in Santa Barbara, where he began as a traffic reporter and became a sports talk host in summer 1987. At the end of 1990, he moved to XTRA Sports 690 in San Diego, where he began what is known as The Jim Rome Show, or "The Jungle". The show was nationally syndicated in 1996.

From 2003 to 2012 Rome hosted a television show Jim Rome Is Burning (originally Rome Is Burning), which aired on ESPN in the United States and TSN2 in Canada. Beginning in April 2012, Rome had a television sports talk show on CBS Sports Network named Rome. During the same time period he had a monthly TV sports/entertainment talk show on Showtime named Jim Rome on Showtime. Rome concluded in March 2015. Other past hosting jobs include sports discussion television shows Talk2 (ESPN2, 1993 to 1998), The FX Sports Show (FX), and The Last Word (Fox Sports Net).

== Controversy and incidents ==
Rome gained notoriety in 1994 for an incident on Talk2 when his guest was NFL quarterback Jim Everett (who was then with the New Orleans Saints). Rome had often referred to Everett on radio as "Chris" (after Chris Evert, the female tennis player), suggesting that Everett was less than a man whenever he shied away from getting hit by the defense. Everett appeared as a guest on the television show, where he warned Rome about repeating the insult. Rome continued to address Everett as "Chris" and Everett overturned the table between them and shoved Rome to the floor while still on the air. Their confrontation resulted in no legal action and Rome publicly apologized to Everett. Rome considers the event as one of his mistakes early in his career.

In 1997, hockey legend Gordie Howe announced an attempt to play a shift with the International Hockey League's Detroit Vipers, which would allow Howe to claim he has played professional hockey in six decades. Rome challenged the star, who was 69, offering a bounty of $3,000 to any player on the team playing against the Vipers to take Howe out of the game permanently by saying, "Drop gloves with Howe and pummel this old fool back to reality." The bounty, which reached at least $5,071, would be given to anyone landing a punch on Howe. Rome clarified the statements were a joke.

In 2012, Rome was involved in a controversy with NBA Commissioner David Stern. During an interview, Rome asked Stern about the conspiracy theories that the NBA draft lottery was fixed in favor of the New Orleans Hornets. Rome said, "Was the fix in for the lottery?" Stern replied with two answers: "Number one, no; and a statement, shame on you for asking." He proceeded to ask Rome the loaded question, "Have you stopped beating your wife yet?" Stern intended to suggest that the subject has been asked a question he can not answer without incriminating himself. He was saying he felt Rome was being unfair.

On January 1, 2015, Rome sent out a tweet, "Is... anyone not in a marching band who thinks those dorks running around with their instruments are cool?" After backlash, he deleted the tweet and apologized. The incident inspired the hashtag "#MarchOnRome".

== Celebrity appearances ==
Rome made cameo appearances in the movies Space Jam, Two for the Money, and the 2005 remake of The Longest Yard. He appeared in Blink-182's music video "What's My Age Again?" and appeared on the HBO sitcom Arliss. Rome was parodied in the South Park episode "Sarcastaball" and the Jim Everett altercation was spoofed in the episode "The F Word".

On May 3, 2004, Rome hosted Pat Tillman's memorial service. On January 28, 2006, Rome was elected to the Southern California Jewish Sports Hall of Fame in Beverly Hills, California. Any Given Sunday, an Oliver Stone film, features John C. McGinley playing a brash sportscaster "Jack Rose," a character based on Rome.

== Horse racing ==
Front

Back

Racing colors of Jim Rome's Jungle Racing, LLC

After poking fun at horse racing for years saying "it's not a sport, it's a bet," Rome seemed to take greater interest in horse racing after interviewing Hall of Fame jockey Kent Desormeaux many times on his show. Rome then took up a stronger interest in buying thoroughbreds. He first was a part owner of Wing Forward, who in his North American debut, made a dramatic last-to-first comeback to win the race.

Rome mentioned it being "one of the most amazing experiences I've ever had." In 2008, Jim and his wife Janet purchased a stake in a two-year-old colt, giving them a potential shot at the Triple Crown stakes races in 2009. Listeners suggested names for the horse, who eventually was named Gallatin's Run.

By 2012, Jim Rome owned part or all of 14 horses in connection with multiple partnerships including his own stable, Jungle Racing, LLC. The first to gain national attention was the winner of the 2012 and 2013 Breeders' Cup Turf Sprint, a filly named Mizdirection. Rome's feelings after winning the Breeder's Cup race: “I’ve just had a moment I’ve never experienced in my life. That was absolutely awesome.” He purchased an interest in her for $50,000 in 2010. He co-owned the mare with Bill Strauss, Danny Gohs, Borris Beljak, and Kevin Nish. As of September 2013, Mizdirection won 11 of 17 starts and retired from racing with $1,719,621 in earnings. She was usually ridden by jockey Mike Smith. Two days after her 2014 Breeders' Cup win, Mizdirection was purchased for $2.7 million at the Fasig-Tipton sale by Al Shaqab Racing of Qatar, then owned by Sheikh Joaan Al Thani, and retired to become a broodmare.

Rome's next significant race horse was Shared Belief, a gelding by Candy Ride, named the Eclipse Award winner in the two-year-old male division for 2013. As a three-year-old, he continued winning and closed out the 2014 year with a record of eight wins in nine races (five of six races in 2014 alone). He earned over $2 million in earnings, again with Mike Smith as his regular rider. As a four-year-old, the horse defeated 2014 Kentucky Derby winner and horse of the year California Chrome in both horses' first race of the season, then Shared Belief had a decisive win in the Santa Anita Handicap.
