= Cash4Gold =

American metal-buying company

- Founded: 1 January 2007
- Headquarters: Pompano Beach, Florida
- Products: Gold, silver, platinum
- Website: www.Cash4Gold.com

Cash4Gold was a company which purchased gold, silver, and platinum, primarily from jewelry mailed in by customers. In 2012, the company declared insolvency and its assets were purchased by Direct Holdings Global.

== Process ==
Consumers requested a pre-paid envelope known as a "Refiner's Pack", which was used to ship their gold materials or precious metals to the Cash4Gold refinery in Florida. A Cash4Gold employee weighed, photographed, and assessed the items using tools such as acids, X-rays, and electronic testing devices. The company would then make the customer a financial offer for the submitted items and remit a check for their value; the customer would have 10 days from that point to accept or decline the offer.

Multiple complaints were raised about the fairness of this process and the valuations of the gold mailed by customers to the company.

Cash4Gold also purchased diamonds, but did not pay for additional gemstones and recommended they be removed from jewelry prior to sending it for evaluation.

== Security measures ==
To ensure customers are the legal owners of the jewelry that is sent in, Florida passed legislation aimed at regulating the online gold-buying industry. Cash4Gold worked with Florida legislators to draft the bill. This new law also requires the company to get a driver's license number and a sworn statement from customers stating that they own the items they are selling. Sellers must be at least 21 years old and the senders’ addresses are verified.

CNN visited Cash4Gold headquarters in March 2010 to see the company's methods of collecting, processing and melting gold jewelry. In the visit, steps shown included customer background checks, a separation of the jewelry, then processing the items for evaluations before sending customers their checks and melting items into gold bars. In a follow-up article written in 2012, Fortune described some of the business practices that led to the company's bankruptcy that same year.

== Company history ==
=== Founding ===
Green Bullion Financial Services LLC was formed in April 2007 and traded under the principle name of Cash4Gold, eventually being located in Pompano Beach, Florida, and being derived from Albar Precious Metal Refining, created by former CEO Jeff Aronson.

In late 2008 venture capital firms Highland Capital Partners and General Catalyst invested $40 million into Green Bullion though both would exit their deals by late 2010. Highland Capital Partners would later be sued by Marlboro Investment Group for fraud and various breaches related to the company. Highland principal Gaurav Tewari, who was alleged to have been a former acting chief operating officer for Cash4Gold, was also named as a defendant.

Due to the rapid growth of their trading and operations during the latter part of 2008 and into the first quarter of 2009, there was a need to address some specific operating issues. Future investors were concerned that the Company would struggle to process the forecasted volume of Refiners' Packs. So a consulting company (Synergetics Installations Worldwide Inc.), based in Portsmouth, New Hampshire, was invited to analyze and then upgrade the current operating processes, with a view to meeting customer service levels and processing significantly higher volumes. The first requirement was to relocate the entire business from relatively small premises to a medium-sized and secure interim site, pending the redevelopment of an existing commercial or industrial unit in the Pompano Beach area, which then became their headquarters in the United States. Processing facilities and procedures were upgraded, as were the customer call center operations and administrative functions. Once the customer service levels and performance of these processes had stabilized within the US operation, the Company launched the Cash4Gold proposition into the United Kingdom, then into other mainland European countries.

David Knight, SVP for international marketing and expansion, joined the team in July 2009 from eBay. Shawn Kernes, a former chief technology officer at StubHub, was the company's COO.

In 2006, Cash4Gold had sales of US$40 million with 14 employees. By May 2009, the company employed about 300 people with nearly 800,000 customer transactions. As of 2010, the company has received more than 1,700 ounces (48 kg) of gold per day with 94% of respondents accepting its cash offer.

=== Controversy ===
Under the leadership of Jeff Aronson, the company claimed to pay between 20-80% of the melt value of the items to the seller, though independent reports suggest less than 20% of the value was normal. The norm for the gold-buying industry is for the seller to be paid more than 90% of the value of the gold.

Channel 10 News in San Diego did an investigation where they sent in a ring containing over 2 grams of gold worth US$17 in weight to three different sites. The payout from Cash4Gold was US$7.91. Consumer Reports, using its "mystery shooter" team, sent 24 identical gold pendants and chains (purchased for US$175 each) to Cash4Gold.com and its competitors. The determined melt value of the jewelry was calculated at around US$70 each when gold was above US$900 an ounce. In comparison with pawn shop and jewelry store quotes (which ranged US$25–50), Cash4Gold.com quoted between US$7.60–12.72 melt value for the jewelry. Similar low quotes were also given by Cash4Gold.com competitors GoldKit (around US$7.81–20.59) and GoldPaq (around US$8.22–13.11).

When Rob Cockerham, a blogger, detailed drastic changes in Cash4Gold's valuation of jewelry after a complaint is made about an initial undervaluing, a search engine optimization consultant offered "a few thousand dollars" for Cockerham to remove the criticism. Cash4Gold CEO Jeff Aronson stated they had nothing to do with the incident, though the consultant stated "everyone [at Cash4Gold] was well aware of what was going on." On Cash4Gold's blog, the company afterwards posted a "clarification statement" allegedly by the consultant contradicting that quote: "Cash4Gold was not aware of all of the tactics being using [sic] in my reputation management services."

After a whistleblower posted on ComplaintsBoard.com discussing the inner workings of Cash4Gold.com, The Consumerist and other blogs were hit with a defamation suit by Cash4Gold.com after running the postings. In September 2009, Cash4Gold.com dropped Consumerist from their lawsuit.

=== Insolvency and new management ===
Green Bullion Financial Services, LLC (DBA Cash4Gold) filed for insolvency on November 9, 2012. Its assets were subsequently purchased by Direct Holdings Global for US$440,000.

== Advertising ==
=== Super Bowl XLIII advertisement ===
The Super Bowl XLIII advertisement featured Ed McMahon and MC Hammer, both of whom were well known for their financial troubles later on in their career. The 30-second advertisement was created and produced by Havas Edge (formerly known as Euro RSCG Edge) and directed by Super Bowl advertising veteran Bryan Buckley and his Hungry Man Productions. Sources place the cost for the 30-second advertisement at US$2.4–3 million. Cash4Gold also played a 60-second advertisement in NBC's pre-game show, making it the first direct-response advertiser in that venue.

The spot received considerable news coverage and was seen by many commentators as a harbinger of the economic situation which was bottoming out in the United States at the time it aired.

=== Commercial sponsorships ===
In the past Cash4Gold.com has signed sponsorships with Milwaukee Bucks, a multi-car sponsorship with JD Motorsports of NASCAR, Jim Dunn Racing of NHRA, and mixed martial arts (MMA) competitor Randy "The Natural" Couture.

In addition to sponsorships of Randy Couture, Cash4Gold also sponsored his charity, the Xtreme Couture G.I. Foundation which honors veterans of the U.S. Armed Forces.

Cash4Gold sponsored MMA "Train the Troops" events at Camp Pendleton, Marine Corps Air Station Miramar and Marine Corps Air Station Yuma. The three "Train The Troops" events were held at three Marine bases and included 12 professional fighters and trainers, as well as hundreds of Marines. There were six four-hour-long training sessions.

Cash4Gold signed a one-year deal with UCMMA for their 2010 events, which adds to their interest in MMA and sponsorship deals with Cristiane Santos ("The Cyborg"), Brandon Vera, Tim Kennedy, Gray Maynard, Leonard Garcia, and Damacio Page. UCMMA is an MMA organization based in the United Kingdom and has a history of more than 40 high profile, successful events.

Equity partner MC Hammer and Cash4Gold teamed up to donate resources to Feed the Children to help with relief efforts following storms in the Philippines, American Samoa, Indonesia and Georgia in the United States. They also handed out meals to families affected by the recession in the Stockton, California area. In December 2009, MC Hammer and Cash4Gold helped Feed the Children launch Breakfast2Live. For the 2009 holiday season, Cash4Gold and MC Hammer handed out toys at the Broward County, Florida Sheriff's Office's annual "Toys for Tots and Teens" event.

== Related businesses ==
=== The Estate Buyer ===
Cash4Gold launched a new division in 2009 called "The Estate Buyer" which caters to individual selling high-end jewelry from brand-name manufacturers. Unlike Cash4Gold, "The Estate Buyer" does not base its offers on the melt value of gold in an item, but upon reselling the items.

Operations for The Estate Buyer were not continued after the 2012 bankruptcy.

=== OroPorDinero.com ===
Cash4Gold.com also had a Spanish-language website called "OroPorDinero.com."

=== United Kingdom ===
Founded in July 2009, Green Bullion Europe Ltd. launched their Cash4Gold services in the United Kingdom, operating from a small office in Sheffield. The volume of Refiners' Packs received in the first few weeks were very low, but then rapidly grew as the Company moved to a new administrative and processing location at Catcliffe, near Sheffield. The new Company was cash-positive within 12 weeks of starting to trade. This new location became the hub for both the UK operation, and the company's expansion into Europe. In 2012, the company was cited by the Advertising Standards Authority for misleading advertisements.

Various UK media organizations have undertaken trials of Cash4Gold's UK service and found their valuation greatly below the independently assessed fair market value. For instance, in November 2009, the BBC's Newsbeat program had gold valued by an independent gold bullion dealer in Mayfair, London, at around 300 GBP. Three jewelers in Hatton Garden then offered similar amounts for the same collection; Cash4Gold's valuation cheque was for 63 GBP, raised to 100 GBP when the researcher called to get their gold back.

== Parody ==
Cash4Gold has attracted parodies of their business and advertisement models. The "Cats4Gold" website parodies Cash4Gold by encouraging visitors to post their gold in exchange for a cat or kitten (depending on the quantity of gold sent). South Park, That Mitchell and Webb Look, and The Onion have also parodied Cash4Gold and similar companies.
