= A Scause for Applause =

- South Park episode
- Episode no.: Season 16; Episode 13
- Directed by: Trey Parker
- Written by: Trey Parker
- Production code: 1613
- Original air date: October 31, 2012

Episode chronology
← Previous "A Nightmare on FaceTime"	Next → "Obama Wins!"
- South Park season 16

"A Scause for Applause" is the thirteenth episode of the sixteenth season of the American animated sitcom South Park, and the 236th episode of the series overall.

It premiered on Comedy Central in the United States on October 31, 2012. The episode parodies the Lance Armstrong doping scandal and subsequent fallout.

== Plot ==
The town of South Park discontinues using their "What would Jesus do?" bracelets after learning that traces of performance-enhancing drugs and other illicit substances were found on the Shroud of Turin, leading to the conclusion that Jesus did not suffer for humanity's sins or perform miracles of his own ability, but was merely under the influence of drugs. Stan Marsh, however, controversially refuses to take off his bracelet because he simply likes it and has had it for some time. Though he draws criticism, he also inspires a movement called "Stanground" whose adherents wear bracelets to express nonconformity, independence of thought and authenticity. The movement becomes so popular that Stan becomes a celebrity, and appears in a Nike commercial.

However, Stan is subsequently accused by French scientists of having removed his bracelet and gluing it back together. Though scientific tests confirm this, Stan continues to deny the allegation, labeling the matter a "witchhunt". When Stan goes to the lead French scientist's house to search for evidence to discredit him, he runs into Jesus, who is there for the same reason. Agreeing that the accusations against them distract the public from more relevant issues, such as the plight of farmers in Belarus, the two decide to raise awareness of that problem by going to the P.F. Pityef Bracelet Factory, where they learn, in a sequence featuring rhyme and animation in the style of Dr. Seuss, that such bracelets are called scauses. Orange ones are made for the Belarus campaign, which becomes the number one concern among the public.

Despite the scauses, the Belarusian farmers are slaughtered by their government (Jesus' attempt to help fails when he is distracted by a news interview, particularly the reporter questioning if his help isn't just an effort to distract the public from his scandal). The public trades in their now-obsolete orange scauses for more timely ones, and after having profited from South Park consumers' money, P.F. Pityef, the scause manufacturer, leaves town. After Jesus and Stan realize they were duped by the factory, Jesus consumes enough human growth hormone to transform into a monstrous, muscle-bound version of himself. He then marches to and destroys the Pityef Bracelet Factory, killing Pityef himself by sending him through one of his own machines, culminating in him blowing up the factory itself when Pityef's remains severely clog up the grinder. After returning to normal, Jesus tells the public that causes should not be expressed on one's wrists. Instead, he says, they should be expressed on T-shirts: revealing his shirt which reads, "Free Pussy Riot".

== Cultural references ==
The town's abandonment of What Would Jesus Do? bracelets, based on findings of drug use by Jesus, satirizes the fate of Livestrong wristbands after cyclist Lance Armstrong was stripped of his seven Tour de France titles for taking performance-enhancing drugs.

The French-Swedish official has an accent that is similar to Tim Conway’s character Mr. Tudball from The Carol Burnett Show. This is further referenced when he says, "It's ahh-starting to feel like ahh-The Carol Burnett Show in here."

The final scene showing Jesus in a Free Pussy Riot shirt alludes not only to the imprisonment of some of the band's members, but also to the unapproved sale of Pussy Riot paraphernalia in the wake of their public appeal.

== Reception ==
Ryan McGee of The A.V. Club gave the episode an A−, stating that the satire was more potent than in previous episodes, and lauded the storyline's depiction of the human need for causes to believe in and the sequence animated and written in the style of Dr. Seuss.

After the episode aired in Russia, LDPR member and deputy of State Duma Vadim Dengin suggested banning South Park in that country because of the episode's closing scene featuring Jesus Christ advocating the release of the band Pussy Riot, stating that it constituted an attempt to humiliate the Russian Orthodox Church.
