= Reverse Cowgirl (South Park) =

- South Park episode
- Episode no.: Season 16; Episode 1
- Directed by: Trey Parker
- Written by: Trey Parker
- Production code: 1601
- Original air date: March 14, 2012

Episode chronology
← Previous "The Poor Kid"	Next → "Cash for Gold"
- South Park season 16

"Reverse Cowgirl" is the first episode of the sixteenth season of the American animated sitcom South Park, and the 224th episode of the series overall. It premiered on Comedy Central in the United States on March 14, 2012. In the episode, a nationwide catastrophe occurs after Clyde's mother is killed because Clyde forgot to put the toilet seat down.

The episode was written by series co-creator Trey Parker and is rated TV-MA L in the United States. It parodies both the gender-divided social etiquette regarding toilet seats (particularly how most women prefer to have their male spouse or child put down the toilet seat after they use it), and the post-9/11 airport security measures imposed by the Transportation Security Administration. In this episode, Clyde's mother Betsy is instead voiced by Trey Parker rather than April Stewart.

== Plot ==
Fourth grader Clyde Donovan unintentionally leaves the toilet seat up, leading his mother, Betsy, to scold him in front of his friends Stan Marsh, Kyle Broflovski, Eric Cartman and Kenny McCormick after she nearly falls in. This embarrasses Clyde, who asks the boys not to say anything about it at school. Cartman nonetheless tells the entire class the next day, while Butters Stotch is dumbfounded and embarrassed to learn that everyone sits on the toilet facing away from the tank, as he has been sitting facing it in order to use the tank as a shelf for reading material and drinks. Betsy then appears and again excoriates Clyde for leaving the toilet seat up, and takes him home. Later that night, after Clyde again forgets to put the toilet seat down, Betsy falls into the toilet, causing a suction that rips out her organs, killing her.

Betsy's death spurs the Toilet Safety Administration (TSA) to implement new safety regulations for people's toilets, including requiring all toilets to be outfitted with seatbelts and security cameras, conducting surprise inspections in people's homes as they relieve themselves, and creating checkpoints in both private and public bathrooms that create huge lines. Cartman and the rest of the town are outraged, and speak out against these measures, though a schism develops between the women, who insist men should simply put the seat down, and the men, who opine that women should simply check to see if the seat is down before sitting on the toilet. Meanwhile, Stan, Kyle, Clyde and Jimmy Valmer seek legal recourse with an unscrupulous lawyer who says he specializes in suing dead people, and decides to conduct a "sue-ance" that will contact the spirit of John Harington, the inventor of the flush toilet, in order to sue him for Betsy's death. However, the lawyer's attempts fail to contact Harington, and after each attempt, he extorts more money from the boys.

A TSA employee who masturbates while monitoring bathroom security cameras sees that Cartman, armed with a gun, has taken a TSA checkpoint inspector and a baby hostage in his bathroom, before disabling his camera. Randy Marsh leads the public in speaking out against the TSA and the fact that it allowed a terrorist with a gun and a baby past a security checkpoint. Randy also calls for a public sueance, where Betsy's ghost appears, and tells Clyde that the lawyer is a fraud, and that her death is Clyde's fault for not putting their toilet seat down. The real ghost of Harington then appears and angrily announces that it is nobody's fault, saying that everyone is using his invention the wrong way. He explains that his toilet design requires people to sit facing the tank, and not outward, much to the surprise of everyone in the courtroom, except Butters. When Randy states that doing so would require a person to have to remove their pants to use it this way, Harington responds that he indeed intended for users to do that and, pointing to the hole on one of the walls of the prop toilet, indicates that this was why he designed toilets with a laundry hole, much to the surprise of Randy and the others. Clyde eventually begins using the toilet in the manner shown by Harington, but defiantly places the seat up, looks up, and gives the finger to his dead mother.

== Reception ==
Max Nicholson of IGN gave the episode a "Good" score of 7.5 out of 10, noting the "double whammy" of the tackling both the social etiquette of toilet seats and the Transportation Security Administration. Nicholson opined that while the former topic was not necessarily hilarious, it was nonetheless funny, and that Eric was well-used to pace what would have otherwise been a difficult joke to mine for an entire episode. Nicholson also felt that while mocking the TSA was somewhat dated, there was still potential for humor in that topic to be exploited, in particular the masturbating TSA security camera monitor. Less funny, Nicholson felt, were the "sueance" scenes that harbored moments that were clever but not outstanding, and felt like padding, though he lauded the convergence of the two storylines by the episode's climax.

Jacob Kleinman of International Business Times felt the funniest jokes of the episode were those featuring Cartman and Randy, while Eve Conte of Geeks of Doom commented, "Everything about this episode is pure awesomeness".

Ryan McGee of The A.V. Club gave the episode an "A-", having enjoyed its satire of government encroachment onto American civil liberties, and the replacement of personal responsibility on the part of some Americans with superfluous litigation. While McGee felt that the "sueance" scenes dragged somewhat, he felt that Cartman's reaction to the TSA was a worthwhile payoff, and that the show's use of "non-sequitur weirdness" provided strong final moments.

Eric Hochberger of TV Fanatic gave the episode 4 out of 5 stars, finding its gags at the expense of the TSA "hilarious", and the "sueance" scenes "clever", remarking that lawyer jokes never get old. Hochberger singled out the convergence of the two storylines in the episode's climax as his favorite part, and enjoying the fact that Butters' ideas for using the toilet turned out to be correct.

Author and cultural theorist Simone Browne references "Reverse Cowgirl" in her 2015 text Dark Matters: On the Surveillance of Blackness. In the chapter "What Did the TSA Find in Solange's Fro?" Browne examines how the Black security officers depicted in the episode represent a "class of worker that makes airport security possible" while simultaneously racializing the annoyances of the twenty-first century security state as specifically Black.
