= Cartman Finds Love =

- South Park episode
- Episode no.: Season 16; Episode 7
- Directed by: Trey Parker
- Written by: Trey Parker
- Production code: 1607
- Original air date: April 25, 2012

Guest appearance
- Brad Paisley as himself

Episode chronology
← Previous "I Should Have Never Gone Ziplining"	Next → "Sarcastaball"
- South Park season 16

"Cartman Finds Love" is the seventh episode of the sixteenth season of the American animated sitcom South Park, and the 230th episode of the series overall. It premiered on Comedy Central in the United States on April 25, 2012, and is rated TV-MA L and M (ls) in Australia.

In the episode, when a new black girl transfers to South Park Elementary, Cartman is inspired to play matchmaker by setting her up with Token, the one black boy in class, because Cartman believes "black people belong together."

== Plot ==
When the boys learn that a black girl named Nichole has transferred to the school and joined the cheerleading team, Cartman assumes that she will pair up with Token, the only black boy in their school. But when Token demurs at this, Cartman assumes that he is shy and decides to play matchmaker. However, after he overhears her tell the other girls that she has a crush on Kyle, Cartman tells her that he and Kyle are a gay couple, a lie that spreads to the other girls. He then arranges for Token and Nichole to get locked in the boys' locker room overnight so they can develop a relationship, a ploy that is successful. With the aid of "Cupid Me", an imaginary Cupid-like version of himself, Cartman continues his efforts to strengthen their relationship by arranging various gifts for the couple that are made to appear to be from each other.

Eventually, after developing an attraction to Nichole but realizing the girls' new-found interest in him, an enraged Kyle confronts Cartman over his lie. Cartman defends his actions by arguing that Token and Nichole belong together because they are black. Kyle retorts that because Token and Nichole are black does not mean that they belong together, a notion echoed by Nichole's father, William, who is troubled that Nichole is seemingly drawn to the one other black child in town so soon after moving to South Park. Nichole tells him that Token's race is coincidental, as she did not begin a relationship for that reason. She subsequently finds a teddy bear placed on her bed by Cartman, thinking that it is from Token, and after seeing that its dog tag reads "'Cuz Blacks Belong Together", she breaks up with him. Cartman, heartbroken that his match has failed, excoriates Cupid Me, and beats him bloody with a baseball bat. Cartman eventually has a change of heart after watching an ad for laxatives, and rejuvenates Cupid Me with his pleas, telling him that they still have work to do.

When Cartman learns that Kyle and Nichole have gone to Denver to watch an NBA game between the Denver Nuggets and the Los Angeles Clippers together, he goes to the Pepsi Center arena, and makes an impassioned plea on the arena's Jumbotron for couples to recognize the importance of perseverance in their relationships, telling the audience that they should not let society dictate whom they should be with, masking it as a plea to Kyle to not give up on their "relationship". This speech moves Nichole and Token, who are sitting across from one another in the audience. Cartman sabotages Nichole and Kyle's date by singing to him the love song "I Swear" with Brad Paisley. Kyle angrily leaves, telling Nichole that Cartman is the one who set her up with Token, and that he did so because he thinks black people belong together. After the crowd empties the arena following Cartman's announcement that the Batmobile is outside, Token and Nichole run into each other. She tells him that she thought he was only with her because she was black, while he says that he would not even talk to her at first because she was black. Realizing they still have feelings for each other, they decide to ignore the expectations of others, and share a loving embrace. Cupid Me then tells the satisfied Cartman that he has found someone for him as well: Stacy Mullenberg, the poster child for Halitosis Kidz!, an organization dedicated to aiding children with morbidly bad breath. Cartman angrily curses Cupid Me, before a love-induced Stacy begins chasing him around the arena.

== Critical reception ==
Jacob Kleinman of the International Business Times thought the episode was "pretty funny", despite not measuring up to the classic Token episode "Here Comes the Neighborhood".

Ryan McGee of The A.V. Club gave the episode an "A−", finding it a strong mid-season finale for a first half of a season that was otherwise inconsistent. While less serious than the previous season's mid-season finale "You're Getting Old", McGee enjoyed the "sweet, empathetic core" to the episode, and the juxtaposition of Cartman's desire to play matchmaker with the racism that motivated it. McGee also found Mr. Garrison's Game of Thrones lesson "hysterical".

Max Nicholson of IGN found the episode to be a "classic" episode, and a "comfortable" mid-season finale that Nicholson said harkened back to the series' early seasons, though he felt that it did not ultimately "get off the ground" for him. Nicholson thought that Cartman's machinations, and the way they manifested through Cupid Me, were both entertaining, and represented a fitting way to explore the character's distinctive way of expressing affection. Nicholson thought the scenes with Nichole's parents and at the playground did not work as well, though he appreciated the lack of pop culture references and celebrity parodies.
