= 40th Annie Awards =

US media awards ceremony held in 2013

- Date: February 2, 2013
- Site: Royce Hall; Los Angeles, California, U.S.
- Hosted by: Leonard Maltin, Rob Paulsen, Maurice LaMarche and Seth Green
- Organized by: ASIFA-Hollywood

Highlights
- Best Animated Feature: Wreck-It Ralph
- Best Direction: Rich Moore; Wreck-It Ralph
- Most awards: Wreck-It Ralph (5)
- Most nominations: Brave, Rise of the Guardians, and Wreck-It Ralph (10)

The 40th Annual Annie Awards honoring the best in animation of 2012 were held on February 2, 2013 at Royce Hall in Los Angeles, California.

== Production nominees ==
Nominations announced on December 3, 2012

Best Animated Feature	Best Animated Special Production
Wreck-It Ralph—Walt Disney Animation Studios; Brave—Pixar; Frankenweenie—Walt Disney Pictures; Hotel Transylvania—Sony Pictures Animation; ParaNorman—Focus Features; Rise of the Guardians—DreamWorks Animation; The Pirates! Band of Misfits—Aardman Animations; The Rabbi's Cat—GKIDS	Despicable Me Minion Mayhem—Illumination Entertainment; Batman: The Dark Knight Returns, Part 1—Warner Bros. Animation; Beforel Orel: Trust—Starburns Industries, Inc.; Disney Tron: Uprising—Beck’s Beginning—Disney Television Animation; Dragons: Gift of the Night Fury—DreamWorks Animation; Justice League: Doom—Warner Bros. Animation
Best Animated Short Subject	Best Animated Television Production For Preschool Children
Paperman—Walt Disney Animation Studios; Brad and Gary—Illumination Entertainment; Bydlo—National Film Board of Canada; Eyes on the Stars—StoryCorps; Goodnight Mr. Foot—Sony Pictures Animation; Kali the Little Vampire—National Film Board of Canada; The Longest Daycare—Gracie Films, 20th Century Fox Television; Bill Plympton Couch Gag—Gracie Films, 20th Century Fox Television	Bubble Guppies—"A Tooth on the Looth"—Nickelodeon Animation Studio; Little Einsteins—"The Great Schubert's Guessing Game"—Disney Channel; Chuggington—"Magnetic Wilson"—Ludorum; Jake and the Never Land Pirates—"Peter Pan Returns"—Disney Television Animation; Mickey Mouse Clubhouse—"Minnie's Pajama Party"—Disney Junior; Doc McStuffins—"The Right Stuff"—Brown Bag Films; Justin Time—"Marcello’s Meatballs"—Guru Studio
Best Animated Television Production For Children	Best General Audience Animated Television Production
Dragons: Riders of Berk—"How to Pick Your Dragon"—DreamWorks Animation; Adventure Time—"Princess Cookie"—Cartoon Network Studios; Lego Star Wars: The Empire Strikes Out—Threshold Animation Studios; The Penguins of Madagascar—"Action Reaction"—Nickelodeon Animation Studio; SpongeBob SquarePants—"It's a SpongeBob Christmas!"—Nickelodeon Animation Studios; The Amazing World of Gumball—"The Job"—Cartoon Network Studio Europe; The Fairly OddParents—"Farm Pit"—Nickelodeon Animation Studios; The Legend of Korra—"Welcome to Republic City"/"A Leaf in the Wind"—Nickelodeon Animation Studios	Robot Chicken DC Comics Special—Stoopid Buddy Studios; Archer: Space Race, Part 1—Weissman Markovitz Communications for FX; Bob's Burgers: Ear-sy Rider—20th Century Fox TV; Motorcity: Blonde Thunder—Disney Television Animation; Mad: FrankenWinnie/ParaMorgan—Warner Bros. Animation; South Park: Raising the Bar—Central Productions
Best Animated Video Game	Best Student Film
Journey—Sony Computer Entertainment America; Borderlands 2—Gearbox Software; Family Guy: Back to the Multiverse—Heavy Iron Studios; Skullgirls—Lab Zero Games	Head Over Heels—Timothy Reckart; Can We Be Happy Now—Tahnee Gehm; Defective Detective—Avner Geller & Stevie Lewis; I Am Tom Moody—Ainslie Henderson; Ladies Knight—Joseph Rothenberg; Origin—Jessica Poon; The Ballad of Poisonberry Pete—Adam Campbell, Elizabeth McMahill, Uri Lotan; Tule Lake—Michelle Ikemoto
