= Jewpacabra =

- South Park episode
- Episode no.: Season 16; Episode 4
- Directed by: Trey Parker
- Written by: Trey Parker
- Production code: 1604
- Original air date: April 4, 2012

Episode chronology
← Previous "Faith Hilling"	Next → "Butterballs"
- South Park season 16

"Jewpacabra" /ˈdʒuːpəˈkɑːbrə/ is the fourth episode of the sixteenth season of the American animated sitcom South Park, and the 227th episode of the series overall. It premiered on Comedy Central in the United States on April 4, 2012. In this episode, South Park's big Easter egg hunt is in jeopardy when there are rumors of a dangerous beast lurking in the woods nearby. Cartman tries to warn everyone that their lives are at risk if they participate in the egg hunt. No one believes him until he produces video evidence of the mysterious being. The episode was written and directed by Trey Parker and was rated TV-MA LV in the United States.

== Plot ==
When Kyle finds his mother educating Cartman on Passover, because of a claimed interest in Jewish culture on Cartman's part, Kyle is suspicious. Cartman tells Kyle and his other schoolmates of a blood-sucking creature called "Jewpacabra" that preys on children, and mentions reports of incidents that he implies are the result of the creature. Kyle denounces this idea, and accuses Cartman of spreading lies, as there is no such creature. Cartman does not relent in his efforts, taking Butters with him to hunt the Jewpacabra, and showing video tape of their efforts to the executives of Sooper Foods, in an attempt to convince them to cancel their Easter egg hunt and let him be the only one allowed to do the Easter egg hunt.

The executives show the video to a team of experts at the Bigfoot Field Researchers Organization (BFRO), who confirm that it is evidence of an actual Jewpacabra, and tell Cartman that the creature will come after him because he exposed its existence. This frightens Cartman into hiding in a church with Tolkien, Craig and Butters, whom Cartman pays $20 to protect him. Cartman is nonetheless abducted by the Sooper Foods executives, who dress him in an Easter bunny costume and chain him to a cement block in a field in order to sacrifice him to the Jewpacabra, which will make the Easter egg hunt possible. When Kyle appears before Cartman, Cartman pleads with him to help him escape, but when Kyle says he will only do so if Cartman admits he lied about the Jewpacabra, Cartman's inability to be honest about what caused his predicament causes Kyle to abandon him. BFRO then see Cartman and think he is a real life "Bunny-Man", so they shoot him with a tranquilizer and hope to make an Animal Planet program documenting their capture, but instead of taking Cartman as their evidence, they take the gun with which they shot him.

Cartman then experiences a tranquilizer-induced dream. He awakes in Ancient Egypt amidst a swarm of locusts and downpour of frogs. He asks "his Hebrew friend" Kyle about it, who tells him the Plagues of Egypt are the result of a cruel and capricious God. He asks his father the Pharaoh (portrayed as a troubled but fair ruler) for advice, but their conversation (including a musical number) is interrupted by the Jews beginning to graphically slaughter lambs, so as to avoid the tenth plague. In abject religious terror, Cartman swears to God that if he is spared, he will become Jewish.

Meanwhile, Kyle has a change of heart and frees the delirious Cartman from his captivity, takes him home, and puts him to bed. When Cartman awakens with no knowledge of how he got home, he classifies the experience as a religious epiphany, and announces to everyone at the Easter egg hunt that he has converted to Judaism. When he tells everyone that they should convert too by recognizing Jehovah as their true God and denying Christ, the assembled Christians label Cartman as a heathen and return to their hunt. Cartman apologizes to Kyle, saying he now knows what he feels like to be mocked by others for being Jewish, and the two wish each other a Happy Passover. The camera then pans up to a Star of David shining at the center of the Sun.

== Critical reaction ==
Jacob Kleinman of the International Business Times thought the episode was generally "solid", though not as funny as the previous week's episode. Kleinman singled out the ancient Egypt sequence as his favorite, and also thought that the manner in which Cartman's Jewpacabra stories backfired on him were "hilarious, historic and extremely shocking".

== See also ==
- List of Easter television episodes
