= Raising the Bar (South Park) =

- South Park episode
- Episode no.: Season 16; Episode 9
- Directed by: Trey Parker
- Written by: Trey Parker
- Production code: 1609
- Original air date: October 3, 2012

Episode chronology
← Previous "Sarcastaball"	Next → "Insecurity"
- South Park season 16

"Raising the Bar" is the ninth episode of the sixteenth season of the American animated satire South Park, and the 232nd episode of the series overall. It premiered on Comedy Central in the United States on October 3, 2012, and is rated TV-MA L. The episode won the 2013 Primetime Emmy Award for Outstanding Animated Program.

In the episode, Cartman comes to accept that he is obese. However, rather than resolving to lose weight, he concludes that he is entitled to use a mobility scooter for transportation. This attitude is embraced by other obese people throughout the country, including reality television personality and pageant participant Alana "Honey Boo Boo" Thompson, who is eventually pitted against Cartman in a spaghetti-wrestling match on the White House South Lawn. While Kyle worries that the standards of decency are deteriorating, James Cameron ventures into the ocean depths to find and raise the societal bar to a higher level.

== Plot ==
While shopping at Walmart, Kyle and Cartman get into an argument over Cartman's weight. Kyle says that Cartman will end up becoming so obese that he will soon have to start using a mobility scooter, as many of the other customers in the store are doing. Later, Cartman admits to Kyle that he is fat, but instead of taking measures to lose weight, he acquires a scooter of his own, infuriating Kyle. Eventually, Cartman shamelessly takes advantage of his new handicapped status as he and other scooter users file multiple lawsuits against businesses to force them to make their restroom scooter accessible. When the cost of these upgrades is passed on to taxpayers, some outraged individuals retaliate by knocking over scooter users. The Department of Health then orders all scooters to be fitted with mechanical uprighting devices. Cartman responds to Kyle's anger over this waste of taxpayer money by accusing Kyle of supporting scooter-tipping and causing anorexia nervosa, saying that using a scooter does not make him "white trash" like Alana "Honey Boo Boo" Thompson, the star of TLC's Here Comes Honey Boo Boo.

Kyle, unfamiliar with the show, watches an episode and is shocked by the behavior of the Thompson family, such as Honey Boo Boo's habits of drinking Red Bull and Mountain Dew and her relentless heart attacks. He comes to believe that the societal bar has been lowered so much that no one feels shame over their actions anymore. Eventually, Token offers to help Kyle make a documentary film about Cartman's behavior to make his action public. However, Kyle is unaware that Token is using the footage to create a new reality series, Here Comes Fatty Doo Doo, in order to exploit Cartman for financial gain. Torn by guilt, Kyle informs Cartman of Token's intentions, and Cartman obtains a cease and desist order to stop Token from airing the program. However, when Cartman learns that the first episode has already aired and was beaten in the ratings by Here Comes Honey Boo Boo, he refuses to let Honey Boo Boo outshine him, and challenges her to a spaghetti wrestling match during a Symposium on Obesity hosted by First Lady Michelle Obama on the South Lawn of the White House.

Meanwhile, film director James Cameron embarks on an ocean voyage to find the bar and raise it, despite his crew's attempts to explain that "the bar" is only a metaphor. After descending to a depth of over 50,000 feet in a submersible, he is confronted by composer Randy Newman, who fears no one will hire him if the bar is raised. After besting Newman, Cameron successfully locates and raises the bar. As soon as he does, the attendees at the Symposium wrestling match begin to feel disgusted and leave. This includes Michelle Obama, who puts a stop to the wrestling and announces that from now on, she will dedicate her husband's administration to fighting childhood obesity, which she does by beating up Cartman and destroying his scooter.

Back on his ship, Cameron, having completed his mission, announces to the crew that he will next embark on the filming of Avatar 2. When his support team tells him that the public should know that he saved them by heroically raising the bar, Cameron responds that he does not do what he does for his own interests, but because it is in his nature.

== Production ==
According to the DVD commentary, the inspiration for the episode came after reports that Disneyland was building their ride lines wide enough to include mobility scooters. Neither Parker nor Stone had heard of Here Comes Honey Boo Boo until they learned it was beating South Park in the Wednesday night ratings, inspiring Cartman's reaction in the episode.

== Critical reception ==
The episode won the 2013 Primetime Emmy Award for Outstanding Animated Program. It competed against Kung Fu Panda: Legends of Awesomeness, The Simpsons, Bob's Burgers and Regular Show at the 65th Primetime Emmy Awards, which was held September 22, 2013.

The episode was nominated for but lost the 2013 Annie award for best animated production to the Robot Chicken DC Comics Special.

Marcus Gilmer of The A.V. Club gave the episode a B+, writing "only South Park would think to work in something like Cameron's deep sea explorations into a storyline already involving Honey Boo Boo and obesity and, yet, make it work as a commentary on what a shit culture we've made for ourselves." Max Nicholson of IGN gave the episode an 8.7/10. Commenting on the meta conclusion to the episode, "perhaps South Park is the one responsible for letting the bar fall so low. It's a thought-provoking sentiment, and with a show that has started calling itself out in recent years, it was nice to see Matt and Trey take some of that responsibility."

June Thompson, the mother of Honey Boo Boo, took exception to the way she and her family were depicted in the episode. Though she indicated that she was amused by some of the various spoofs that have been made of her family, such as those on Saturday Night Live, she characterized "Raising the Bar"'s portrayal of her family as "trashy".

James Cameron revealed on a 2014 Reddit AMA that he enjoyed the parody of himself, saying that "It's funny. It's like they were actually on the expedition, except I didn't actually make the crew sing a song about me."

== See also ==
- South Park (Park County, Colorado)
- South Park City
