= Cash for Gold (South Park) =

- South Park episode
- Episode no.: Season 16; Episode 2
- Directed by: Trey Parker
- Written by: Trey Parker
- Production code: 1602
- Original air date: March 21, 2012

Episode chronology
← Previous "Reverse Cowgirl"	Next → "Faith Hilling"
- South Park season 16

"Cash for Gold" is the second episode of the sixteenth season of the American animated television series South Park, and the 225th episode of the series overall. It originally aired on Comedy Central in the United States on March 21, 2012. The episode centers on fourth grader Stan Marsh's irritation with J&G Shopping Network and television home shopping networks in general, as he discovers that they prey upon the elderly and fleece them of their money, as well as Eric Cartman's new entrepreneurship inspired by that same idea. The episode was written by series co-creator Trey Parker and is rated TV-MA L in the United States.

== Plot ==
Stan Marsh's grandfather Marvin gives him a bejeweled bolo tie, saying that the Jewels & Gems (J&G) Shopping Network, from which he bought it, claimed that its 14 carat gold and diamonds makes it worth $6,000. After Eric Cartman teases him for wearing such a tacky and unfashionable item, Stan takes it to a Cash For Gold store where he is offered $15 for it. Other such merchants similarly offer him little or nothing for the item, and Stan realizes that his grandfather has been swindled. Cartman shows his friends the J&G infomercials, where half-senile senior citizens are conned into buying cheap jewelry for their relatives at outrageous prices. Stan tries to talk Marvin out of buying him or his sister Shelly more worthless items, but Marvin has Alzheimer's disease and instead relates to Stan an often-repeated anecdote of a Border Collie named Patches he once had, but laments that he can no longer remember what she looked like.

Stan begins a crusade to stop the exploitation of the elderly in this manner, and vows to track down whoever is at the top of the trade. Meanwhile, Cartman decides to get into the infomercial business with Butters Stotch as his sidekick, and not only starts offering his classmates cash for gold but also sets up his own television channel and mimics the tone and techniques of Dean, the host on J&G. He visits a jewelry shop to restock, but he notices the East Asian women at the shop are using the very same mannerisms that he and Dean use, thus revealing they are scam artists as well. During one of Dean's shows, Stan calls in and tells him to kill himself for having conned numerous elderly people out of their money.

Cartman arrives at a factory in India where the jewelry is made, intending to buy from them, and finds Stan is here as well, complaining about what they are doing. In a montage, it is revealed that the business is a continuous loop: the jewelry made at the factory is shipped to the United States, where scam artists sell it to senior citizens, who give it as gifts to relatives. The relatives sell the gifts for cash, those buyers sell the gems and gold to a smelting plant, and the raw materials are shipped back to India to be made back into new jewelry. An employee at the factory gives Stan a picture frame, which he accepts. Stan presents Marvin with a photo of Marvin and his deceased dog Patches in the frame. Marvin then notices Stan's tie, not remembering having given it to him, and tells him it is "gay". Stan replies that he will not wear it anymore. Meanwhile, Stan's earlier call sparks a trend, resulting in Dean receiving calls from the elderly telling him to kill himself. Dean eventually complies and fatally shoots himself in the head, covering a display of worthless jewelry with his blood.

== Reception ==
Max Nicholson of IGN gave the episode a "Great" score of 8 out of 10, noting that although the episode "did take a few scenes to really get cooking", the clips from the infomercial segments were the highlight of the episode, as was "the montage surrounding whoever smelt it denied it and rhymed it actually dealt it". Nicholson also noted the similarity of Stan's phone call to J&G, in which he angrily urges the host to kill himself, to the "Marketing and Advertising" bit from comedian Bill Hicks' 1997 album Arizona Bay.

Marcus Gilmer of The A.V. Club gave the episode a score of "B-". Comparing it to the previous episode "Reverse Cowgirl", he noted, "There were plenty of lines that made me laugh" but that "the episode falls short of previous efforts at social commentary, including last week's episode".
