= 2023 in animation =

2023 in animation is an overview of notable events, including notable awards, list of films released, television show debuts and endings, and notable deaths.

== Events ==
=== January ===
- January 4: Season 2 of Star Wars: The Bad Batch premiered on Disney+.
- January 8:
  - Shion Takeuchi announced on Twitter that her series Inside Job had been cancelled by Netflix, despite having previously been renewed for a second season the previous June.
  - Family Guy's 400th episode "Love Story Guy" premieres on Fox. It was seen by over 1.2 million viewers that night.
- January 9: Koala Man premiered on Hulu.
- January 11: SuperKitties premiered on Disney Junior.
- January 12:
  - Velma, the first adult-oriented show based on the Scooby-Doo franchise, premiered on HBO Max to negative reviews from critics, and panned by audiences.
  - Justin Roiland, co-creator of Rick and Morty and Solar Opposites, was charged with felony domestic violence and false imprisonment in Orange County, California in connection with a 2020 incident toward an unnamed woman he was reportedly dating. After the charges were laid, multiple people came forward with their own allegations of abuse by Roiland, including claims of predatory behavior towards minors. Roiland resigned from Squanch Games on January 16, and was replaced by Dan Stevens as Korvo in Solar Opposites and by Ian Cardoni and Harry Belden as Rick and Morty respectively.
- January 13:
  - Hamish Steele, creator of Dead End: Paranormal Park, announced that Netflix had cancelled the series.
  - Dan Povenmire's new overall deal with Disney Branded Television was announced at Television Critics Association winter press tour, the deal includes the following:
    - A revival of Phineas and Ferb for 40 new episodes (which would be split across two seasons)
    - A second season renewal of Hamster & Gretel.
  - SpongeBob SquarePants Presents The Tidal Zone premiered on Nickelodeon, it is a special crossover event between SpongeBob SquarePants and its spin-offs The Patrick Star Show & Kamp Koral: SpongeBob's Under Years.
- January 15: Season 2 of Kung Fu Panda: The Dragon Knight premiered on Netflix.
- January 20: Shape Island premiered on Apple TV+.
- January 21: The Owl House special "For the Future" premiered on Disney Channel.
- January 24:
  - A second Rock Dog direct-to-video sequel, Rock Dog 3: Battle the Beat, was released.
  - Adult Swim announced that month that Roiland had been dismissed from Rick and Morty and on January 25, 20th Television Animation confirmed that he had also been removed from Solar Opposites and Koala Man.
- January 26: Season 2 of Daniel Spellbound premiered on Netflix.
- January 30: Princess Power premiered on Netflix.

=== February ===
- February 1: Season 2 of The Proud Family: Louder and Prouder premiered on Disney+.
- February 2: Music video for "Love Louder" by The Meeps, was released on YouTube.
- February 6: Work It Out Wombats! premiered on PBS Kids.
- February 8:
  - Episodes 11-15 of Hamster & Gretel were released on Disney+ (with episode 15 being released 3 days before premiering on Disney Channel).
  - Season 26 of South Park begins on Comedy Central with the premiere of the Valentine's Day special "Cupid Ye".
- February 9: My Dad the Bounty Hunter premiered on Netflix.
- February 10: Moon Girl and Devil Dinosaur premiered on Disney Channel in the United States.
- February 17:
  - The third and final season of Animaniacs premiered on Hulu.
  - The third episode of Murder Drones, titled "The Promening", was released on YouTube on the GLITCH channel.
- February 24: The second season of Oddballs premiered on Netflix.
- February 25: 50th Annie Awards.

=== March ===
- March 3: Nickelodeon officially updated its current "Nickelodeon Productions" logo.
- March 4: Nickelodeon got a complete rebrand in the style of the now re-visioned splat during the 2023 Kids' Choice Awards.
- March 10: Kiff premiered on Disney Channel in the United States.
- March 11: The third episode in Season 2 of Helluva Boss, titled "Exes and Oohs", premiered on YouTube.
- March 12: 95th Academy Awards:
  - Guillermo del Toro's Pinocchio, directed by Guillermo del Toro and Mark Gustafson, won the Academy Award for Best Animated Feature, becoming the first non-Disney film to win that award since Spider-Man: Into the Spider-Verse in 2019.
  - The Boy, the Mole, the Fox and the Horse, directed by Peter Baynton and Charlie Mackesy, won the Academy Award for Best Animated Short Film.
- March 15: The first 6 episodes of Kiff were released on Disney+ (with episodes 3-6 being released before premiering on Disney Channel).
- March 17: Animal Logic's The Magician's Elephant was released on Netflix.
- March 20: The seventh season of Gabby's Dollhouse premiered on Netflix.
- March 22:
  - All criminal charges were dropped against Justin Roiland.
  - Digman! premiered on Comedy Central.
- March 24:
  - The final episode of Pokemon Ultimate Journeys: The Series premiered in Japan, serving as the last appearances of Ash Ketchum and his Pikachu as the core main characters.
  - A fully-fledged animated music video for the song "Wanderer", by Nijisanji VTuber Ren Zotto, premiered on YouTube.
- March 25: The third season of Big City Greens concludes on Disney Channel with the half-hour special "Long Goodbye". The show's main antagonist Chip Whistler is revealed to still be alive at the end of the episode.
- March 27:
  - In Canada, Teletoon is rebranded as Cartoon Network with the latter's original channel in that country rebranded as Boomerang.
  - Season 20 of American Dad! begins on TBS with the premiere of the episode "Fellow Traveler". The season's premiere was watched by only 470 thousand viewers that night, marking another low in the show's viewership.
- March 29:
- Iron Circus Animation's Lackadaisy short film premiered on YouTube.
- South Park concludes its 26th season on Comedy Central with the episode "Spring Break". It was only seen by 47 hundred thousand viewers that night, marking another low in the show's viewership.
- March 31: Eva the Owlet premiered on Apple TV+.

=== April ===
- April 1: The second and final season of The Ghost and Molly McGee premiered on Disney Channel.
- April 2: The first 5 episodes from Season 2 of The Ghost and Molly McGee released on Disney+, with episodes 2-5 being released before premiering on Disney Channel.
- April 3: The finale episode of Upin & Ipin (season 16) premiered on MNCTV.
- April 5: Illumination and Nintendo's The Super Mario Bros. Movie is released in theaters in the United States ahead of its April 28 debut in Japan.
- April 7: The fourth episode of Murder Drones, titled "Cabin Fever", was released on YouTube on the GLITCH channel.
- April 8: The series finale of The Owl House, "Watching and Dreaming", premiered on Disney Channel.
- April 9: The third part of the third season of Bluey premiered on ABC Kids to universal acclaim.
- April 12: The season 1 finale of Moon Girl and Devil Dinosaur premiered on Disney Plus.
- April 14: The first episode of Pokémon Horizons: The Series premiered in Japan, featuring new protagonists Liko and Roy.
- April 17: The seventeenth season of Upin & Ipin, titled "Ibadah Puasa", premiered on MNCTV.
- April 19:
  - The last 4 episodes from Season 3 of Big City Greens released on Disney+, just a month after the season concluded.
  - Episodes 16-19 of Hamster & Gretel were released on Disney+.
- April 21:
  - The second Bluey soundtrack album, "Dance Mode!", is released.
  - Paw Patrol concludes its eighth season on Nickelodeon in the US with the episodes "Pups Stop a Big Leak/Pups Save a Baby Anteater/Pups Save a Hatch Day/Pups Save the Munchie Mobile".
- April 22: Paw Patrol concludes its ninth season on TVO in Canada with the episode "Charger Visits the Pups/Pups Save a Shiny Ride".
- April 28:
  - Frog and Toad premiered on Apple TV+.
  - Alan Becker releases the first episode of Animator vs Animation VI, titled "Wanted", on YouTube.

=== May ===
- May 3: Season 2 of Star Wars: Visions was released on Disney+.
- May 4: Star Wars: Young Jedi Adventures premiered on Disney Junior in the United States.
- May 5: Unicorn: Warriors Eternal premiered on Adult Swim in the United States.
- May 7: Family Guy concludes its 21st season on Fox with the episode "Adult Education", which follows up from the events of the previous episode "From Russia With Love".
- May 8: Season 2 of Spirit Rangers was released on Netflix.
- May 11: The third and final season of Ultraman was released on Netflix.
- May 12: Ross Venokur's Rally Road Racers was released.
- May 13: We Baby Bears concludes its first season on Cartoon Network with the episode "Little Fallen Star".
- May 16: The Loud House concludes its sixth season on Nickelodeon with the episode "Love Stinks".
- May 17: Season 7 of The Loud House begins on Nickelodeon with the premiere of the episode "Waking History".
- May 18: Kitti Katz premiered on Netflix.
- May 20: The fourth episode in Season 2 of Helluva Boss, titled "Western Energy", premiered on YouTube.
- May 21:
  - The Simpsons concludes its 34th season on Fox with its 750th episode "Homer's Adventures Through the Windshield Glass", featuring the guest stars Lizzo, Tim Robinson, and Bowen Yang.
  - The Great North concludes its third season on Fox with the second part of the episode "For Whom the Smell Tolls".
  - Bob's Burgers concludes its 13th season on Fox with the episode "Amelia", this was Paul Reubens' final voice acting role before his death 2 months later.
- May 22: Season 3 of The Creature Cases was released on Netflix.
- May 23:
  - The English dub of Alan Ituriel's independent animated series Villainous premiered on Max.
  - Gremlins: Secrets of the Mogwai and Season 2 of Clone High premiered on Max.
  - All remaining 20th Century Studios and Searchlight Pictures titles were removed from HBO Max as the service is discontinued. However, they were released on Max (the successor of HBO Max and Discovery+) on the same day until their pay 1 window deal with HBO ends.
- May 27: Season 10 of Paw Patrol begins on TVO in Canada with the premiere of the episodes "Pups Save the Wacky Water Skiers/Pups Save the Mayor's Assistant".
- May 29: Craig of the Creek concludes its fourth season on Cartoon Network with the premiere of the following episodes:
  - "Craig of the Campus"
  - "Wheels Collide"
  - "Bernard of the Creek" (two-part special)
  - "Left in the Dark"

=== June ===
- June 1: Ninjago: Dragons Rising was released on Netflix.
- June 2: Sony Pictures Animation's Spider-Man: Across the Spider-Verse was released.
- June 3: Reuters reported that 75 members of Pixar's workforce were laid off by The Walt Disney Company as part of the company's reconstruction. Lightyear director Angus MacLane and producer Galyn Susman were among those affected due to the film's commercial failure.
- June 8: Hailey's On It! premiered on Disney Channel in the United States.
- June 9:
  - The fifth episode of Murder Drones, titled "Home", was released on YouTube on the GLITCH channel.
  - Season 3 of The Snoopy Show is aired on Apple TV+.
- June 11: Ladybug & Cat Noir: The Movie had its world premiere at the Grand Rex theatre in Paris ahead of its Netflix streaming debut on July 28.
- June 14:
  - Nimona had its world premiere at the Annecy International Animation Film Festival in France ahead of its June 30 streaming debut on Netflix.
  - Pupstruction premiered on Disney Junior in the United States.
- June 16: Pixar's Elemental was released.
- June 17: Season 2 of We Baby Bears premiered on Cartoon Network in the United States. Video game developer Toby Fox guest stars as a skeleton character named Jared.
- June 19: DreamWorks Animation's preschool series Not Quite Narwhal premiered on Netflix.
- June 21: Minnie's Bow-Toons: Camp Minnie premiered on Disney+.
- June 22: Legendary Television's Skull Island premiered on Netflix, as part of the MonsterVerse.
- June 24: Serving as the continuation of its previous episode "Ozzie's" back in October 2021, Part 2 of the two-part season 1 finale of Helluva Boss and eighth overall, titled "Queen Bee", was released on YouTube. American singer Kesha Sebert guest stars.
- June 26:
  - Genius Brands is renamed Kartoon Studios.
  - Among twelve titles, Star Trek: Prodigy was removed from Paramount+ after being canceled three days earlier, June 24, due to the service's upcoming merger with the Showtime app. The series would later be picked up by Netflix four months later on October 11. The first season released on the service on December 25, with the second season released in 2024.
- June 28: Episodes 6-10 from Season 2 of The Ghost and Molly McGee were released on Disney+, with episodes 9 & 10 being released before premiering on Disney Channel.
- June 30:
  - DreamWorks Animation's Ruby Gillman, Teenage Kraken was released.
  - The series finale episode of Bubble Guppies premiered on Nickelodeon, in the United States, after 12 years on television.

=== July ===
- July 3: Nick Jr. channel, in the United States, got a complete rebrand in the style of the now re-visioned splat.
- July 6: Wake Up, Carlo! premiered on Netflix.
- July 7: My Adventures with Superman premiered on Adult Swim in the United States.
- July 8: The fifth episode in Season 2 of Helluva Boss, titled "Unhappy Campers", premiered on YouTube.
- July 10:
  - Season 10 of Paw Patrol begins on Nickelodeon in the US with the premiere of the episodes "Pups Save the Wacky Water Skiers/Pups Save the Mayor's Assistant".
  - Season 5 of Craig of the Creek begins on Cartoon Network with the premiere of the episodes "Who Is the Red Poncho?" & "The Once and Future King", the season's premiere was seen by a combined total of 351 thousand viewers that night.
- July 13: Season 2 of Sonic Prime was released on Netflix.
- July 14:
  - Studio Ghibli's The Boy and the Heron was released.
  - Craig of the Creek concludes its fifth season on Cartoon Network with the half-hour special "Heart of the Forest". The season's finale was seen by a total of 163 thousand viewers that night.
- July 15: The third and final season of Strawberry Shortcake: Berry in the Big City will premiere on YouTube.
- July 19: Warner Bros. Animation and Cartoon Network Studios staff launched an effort to unionize.
- July 20: Nickelodeon bought the rights to the 1987 Teenage Mutant Ninja Turtles series.
- July 23: Season 5 of The Dragon Prince was released early on Netflix four days ahead of its initial July 27 release.
- July 24:
  - DreamWorks Animation's preschool series Dew Drop Diaries premiered on Netflix.
  - Season 8 of Futurama premiered on Hulu, after nearly a decade-long hiatus from its original run.
- July 25: The Venture Bros.: Radiant Is the Blood of the Baboon Heart is released on digital.
- July 26:
  - Fry, Leela, & Bender from Futurama are all added as skins to Fortnite in honor of the show's return on Hulu.
  - El Tigre: The Adventures of Manny Rivera was added to Paramount+.
- July 27:
  - The final season of Looney Tunes Cartoons premiered on Max.
  - Season 4 of Harley Quinn premiered on Max.
- July 28:
  - The final episode of The Wonderful World of Mickey Mouse premiered on Disney+.
  - Captain Fall premiered on Netflix.
- July 31: Paw Patrol concludes its ninth season on Nickelodeon in the US with the episode "Charger Visits the Pups/Pups Save a Shiny Ride".
- Unspecified: Warner Bros. Animation vacated its headquarters at the Warner Bros. Ranch and relocated to the Second Century Development building.

=== August ===
- August 1: Cartoon Network Studios vacated its building in Burbank, California after nearly 23 years, and relocated its headquarters to Second Century Development (along with Warner Bros. Animation).
- August 2: Paramount Pictures and Nickelodeon's Teenage Mutant Ninja Turtles: Mutant Mayhem was released.
- August 4: The third season of Deer Squad was released on iQIYI.
- August 7: Season 8 of Gabby's Dollhouse premiered on Netflix.
- August 10: Mech Cadets premiered on Netflix.
- August 14: Season 4 of Solar Opposites premiered on Hulu.
- August 16: Episodes 20-23 of Hamster & Gretel were released on Disney+.
- August 17: Season 2 of My Dad the Bounty Hunter was released on Netflix.
- August 18:
  - Pearl Studio's The Monkey King was released on Netflix.
  - The sixth episode of Murder Drones, titled "Dead End", was released on YouTube on the GLITCH channel.
- August 28: Cartoon Network’s classic shows, Courage the Cowardly Dog, Dexter's Laboratory, Ed, Edd n Eddy, and Grim & Evil, were added on Adult Swim’s throwback block Checkered Past since they became adult interests in today's standards.
- August 30: The final season of Archer premiered on FXX, in the United States, after 14 years on television.
- August 31: Adventure Time: Fionna and Cake premieres on Max.

=== September ===
- September 1: The final episodes of Disenchantment premiered on Netflix.
- September 7:
  - The third and final season of Kung Fu Panda: The Dragon Knight premiered on Netflix.
  - ENGI's Gamera Rebirth premiered on Netflix.
- September 8: Tiny Toons Looniversity, a reboot series of Tiny Toon Adventures, premiered on Max and the next day on Cartoon Network.
- September 9: The sixth episode in Season 2 of Helluva Boss, titled "Oops", premiered on YouTube.
- September 20: Episodes 11-14 from Season 2 of The Ghost and Molly McGee were released on Disney+.
- September 23: The fourth season of Big City Greens premiered on Disney Channel.
- September 24: Krapopolis premiered on Fox.
- September 25: Futurama concludes its eighth season on Hulu.
- September 26: The Scooby-Doo direct-to-video film Scooby-Doo! and Krypto, Too! releases on DVD & Digital services. The movie is a crossover with many characters from DC Comics, specifically Krypto the Superdog.
- September 28:
  - Castlevania: Nocturne premiered on Netflix.
  - Hazbin Hotel got renewed for a second season, just nearly 4 months before the show's official premiere on Prime Video.
- September 29: PAW Patrol: The Mighty Movie was released.

=== October ===
- October 1:
  - The stop-motion animated Mickey Mouse & Friends Halloween special Mickey and Friends Trick or Treats premiered simultaneously on Disney Channel, Disney Junior, and Disney XD. Released on Disney+ the following day.
  - Season 35 of The Simpsons begins on Fox with the premiere of the episode "Homer's Crossing".
  - Season 14 of Bob's Burgers begins on Fox with the premiere of the episode "Fight at the Not Okay Chore-ral".
  - Season 22 of Family Guy begins on Fox with the premiere of the episode "Fertilized Megg".
- October 2: WildBrain's The first computer-animated Strawberry Shortcake: Berry in the Big City Halloween special Strawberry Shortcake and the Beast of Berry Bog will premiere on Netflix.
- October 8: The Hollywood Reporter reported that 70 members of DreamWorks Animation's workforce, across its film and television departments, were laid off as part of the company's overall cost reduction.
- October 12: Naz's Good Night World anime series adaptation premiered on Netflix.
- October 13: The first/pilot episode of The Amazing Digital Circus was released on YouTube, which quickly rose in popularity across the internet. It has become both the most popular video on the GLITCH YouTube channel, and the most watched indie-animated pilot in history.
- October 15:
  - Walt Disney Animation Studios' Once Upon a Studio premiered on ABC as part of a TV special celebrating the Walt Disney Company's 100th anniversary. It was released in theaters in front of the Disney100 limited re-release of Moana.
  - The seventh season of Rick and Morty premiered on Adult Swim.
- October 16:
  - Walt Disney Animation Studios celebrates its centennial.
  - Chip Chilla, a preschool animated series starring Rob Schneider, premiered on the Daily Wire streaming app, Bentkey, to mixed-to-negative reviews, with critics and audiences accusing the series of showing similarities to the Australian-animated series, Bluey.
- October 18: Skydance Animation signed a multi-year partnership deal with Netflix to develop and produce animated films, starting with "Spellbound" in 2024.
- October 20: Season 7 of Big Mouth premiered on Netflix.
- October 22: The first season of the anime series The Apothecary Diaries premiered on Nippon TV and its affiliates.
- October 25: The first 5 episodes from Season 4 of Big City Greens were released on Disney+.
- October 26: During an interview on Today as part of the fifth anniversary of Bluey, the titular character, Bluey Heeler, confirmed that she isn't a fan of the animated series, Chip Chilla, which had been accused for showing similarities to the Australian-animated series.
- October 27: South Park: Joining the Panderverse premiered on Paramount+.
- October 29: The seventh episode in Season 2 of Helluva Boss, titled "Mammon's Magnificent Musical Mid-Season Special (ft Fizzarolli)", premiered on YouTube.

=== November ===
- November 1:
  - Disney+ releases the original version of Arthur and the Minimoys for the first time in the United States. Due to The Weinstein Company's closure after the arrest of Harvey Weinstein for sexual assault in 2018, the Weinstein cut is now out-of-commerce.
  - WildBrain's The second computer-animated Strawberry Shortcake: Berry in the Big City Christmas special Strawberry Shortcake's Perfect Holiday will premiere on Netflix.
- November 2: Spin Master's Unicorn Academy premiered on Netflix.
- November 3:
  - Michael Green's Blue Eye Samurai series premiered on Netflix.
  - Season 2 of Invincible premiered on Amazon Prime Video.
- November 6: The Christmas special of Gabby's Dollhouse, "The Mermaid Christmas Cruise", was released on Netflix.
- November 9: It was announced that Warner Bros. Discovery has shelved the release of the upcoming Looney Tunes film Coyote vs. Acme so they can claim a tax write-off of $30 million out of it, this caused major backlash with both fans AND the crew members of the movie.
- November 13: Warner Bros. Discovery allows the producers of Coyote vs. Acme to shop the film to other distributors after learning about the negative feedback about them shelving the movie to receive a tax loss.
- November 15:
  - Episodes 15-18 from Season 2 of The Ghost and Molly McGee were released on Disney+, with episode 18 being released before premiering on Disney Channel.
  - Episodes 24-27 of Hamster & Gretel released on Disney+.
- November 17:
  - Science Saru's Scott Pilgrim Takes Off anime series premiered on Netflix.
  - DreamWorks Animation's Trolls Band Together, the third film in the Trolls film franchise was released.
- November 19: Bluey celebrates its fifth anniversary.
- November 21: Animal Logic's Leo was released on Netflix.
- November 22: Walt Disney Animation Studios’ Wish was released.
- November 23: Igloo Studio's anime series My Daemon premiered on Netflix.
- November 30: DreamWorks Animation Television's The Bad Guys: A Very Bad Holiday premiered on Netflix.

=== December ===
- December 2 & 3: The second season of BoBoiBoy Galaxy was released on YouTube.
- December 2: Peter Griffin from Family Guy was added as a skin to Fortnite.
- December 5: Walt Disney Pictures announced that three of its Pixar films will finally head to theaters in early 2024 after being a stream-exclusive on Disney+ due to the COVID-19 pandemic: Soul (January), Turning Red (February), and Luca (March).
- December 6: The Ghost and Molly McGee episodes "White Christmess/Perfect Day" were released on Disney+, just 5 days after it premiered on Disney Channel.
- December 7: The third and final season of Hilda was released on Netflix.
- December 8: Diary of a Wimpy Kid Christmas: Cabin Fever premiered on Disney+.
- December 9: The season one finale of Hamster & Gretel premiered on Disney Channel.
- December 11: Craig Before the Creek, the prequel movie to Craig of the Creek, initially releases on digital services.
- December 13:
  - Lady and the Tramp, and The Nightmare Before Christmas are added to the National Film Registry.
  - Animator Mark Henn retires from Disney Animation after working at the company for 43 years.
- December 15:
  - Aardman's sequel film Chicken Run: Dawn of the Nugget was released as a Netflix exclusive, twenty-three years after the original back in 2000.
  - Pilot episode of Olan Rogers' next cartoon Godspeed premiered on YouTube. Voice actor Tom Kenny guest stars.
- December 18: American Dad! concludes its 20th season on TBS with the Christmas special "Into the Jingleverse". The season's finale was watched by only 300 thousand viewers that night, marking another low in the show's viewership.
- December 20: South Park (Not Suitable for Children) premiered on Paramount+.
- December 22: Illumination's Migration was released.

== Awards ==
- Academy Award for Best Animated Feature: Guillermo del Toro's Pinocchio
- Academy Award for Best Animated Short Film: The Boy, the Mole, the Fox and the Horse
- American Cinema Editors Award for Best Edited Animated Feature Film: Guillermo del Toro's Pinocchio
- Annecy International Animated Film Festival Cristal du long métrage: Little Nicholas: Happy As Can Be
- Annie Award for Best Animated Feature: Guillermo del Toro's Pinocchio
- Astra Film Award for Best Animated Film: Guillermo del Toro's Pinocchio
- Annie Award for Best Animated Feature — Independent: Marcel the Shell with Shoes On
- Austin Film Critics Association Award for Best Animated Film: Marcel the Shell with Shoes On
- BAFTA Award for Best Animated Film: Guillermo del Toro's Pinocchio
- BAFTA Award for Best Short Animation: The Boy, the Mole, the Fox and the Horse
- Boston Society of Film Critics Award for Best Animated Film: Turning Red
- Central Ohio Film Critics Association Awards for Best Animated Feature: Marcel the Shell with Shoes On
- César Award for Best Animated Film: My Sunny Maad
- Chicago Film Critics Association Award for Best Animated Film: Guillermo del Toro's Pinocchio
- Critics' Choice Movie Award for Best Animated Feature: Guillermo del Toro's Pinocchio
- Critics' Choice Television Award for Best Animated Series: Harley Quinn
- Dallas–Fort Worth Film Critics Association Award for Best Animated Film: Guillermo del Toro's Pinocchio
- European Film Award for Best Animated Feature Film: No Dogs or Italians Allowed
- Florida Film Critics Circle Award for Best Animated Film: Turning Red
- Golden Globe Award for Best Animated Feature Film: Guillermo del Toro's Pinocchio
- Golden Reel Award for Outstanding Achievement in Sound Editing – Sound Effects, Foley, Dialogue and ADR for Animated Feature Film: Guillermo del Toro's Pinocchio
- Goya Award for Best Animated Film: Unicorn Wars
- Japan Academy Film Prize for Animation of the Year: The First Slam Dunk
- Kids' Choice Award for Favorite Animated Movie: Minions: The Rise of Gru
- Los Angeles Film Critics Association Award for Best Animated Film: Guillermo del Toro's Pinocchio
- Mainichi Film Award for Best Animation Film: Takano Intersection
- Minnesota Film Critics Alliance Award for Best Animated Feature: Puss in Boots: The Last Wish
- NAACP Image Award for Outstanding Animated Motion Picture: Wendell & Wild
- National Board of Review Award for Best Animated Film: Marcel the Shell with Shoes On
- New York Film Critics Circle Award for Best Animated Film: Marcel the Shell with Shoes On
- Online Film Critics Society Award for Best Animated Film: Guillermo del Toro's Pinocchio
- Producers Guild of America Award for Best Animated Motion Picture: Guillermo del Toro's Pinocchio
- San Diego Film Critics Society Award for Best Animated Film: Guillermo del Toro's Pinocchio
- San Francisco Film Critics Circle Award for Best Animated Feature: Guillermo del Toro's Pinocchio
- Satellite Award for Best Animated or Mixed Media Feature: Marcel the Shell with Shoes On
- Saturn Award for Best Animated Film: Marcel the Shell with Shoes On
- Seattle Film Critics Society Award for Best Animated Feature: Marcel the Shell with Shoes On
- St. Louis Gateway Film Critics Association Award for Best Animated Film: Marcel the Shell with Shoes On
- Tokyo Anime Award: One Piece Film: Red
- Toronto Film Critics Association Award for Best Animated Film: Turning Red
- Visual Effects Society Award for Outstanding Visual Effects in an Animated Feature: Guillermo del Toro's Pinocchio
- Washington D.C. Area Film Critics Association Award for Best Animated Feature: Guillermo del Toro's Pinocchio

== Television series debuts ==
Date	Title	Channel, Streaming	Year
January 7	Buddy Daddies	Tokyo MX, Crunchyroll	2023
January 9	Koala Man	Hulu	2023
January 11	SuperKitties	Disney Junior	2023–present
January 12	Velma	HBO Max	2023–2024
January 20	Shape Island	Apple TV+	2023–present
January 30	Princess Power	Netflix	2023–present
February 3	Rubble & Crew	Nickelodeon, Nick Jr. Channel	2023–present
February 6	Work It Out Wombats!	PBS Kids	2023–present
February 9	My Dad the Bounty Hunter	Netflix	2023
February 10	Moon Girl and Devil Dinosaur	Disney Channel	2023–2025
March 6	Bossy Bear	Nickelodeon, Nick Jr.	2023–2024
March 10	Kiff	Disney Channel	2023–present
March 17	Agent Elvis	Netflix	2023
March 22	Digman!	Comedy Central	2023–present
March 22	Kiya & the Kimoja Heroes	Disney Junior	2023–2024
March 31	Eva the Owlet	Apple TV+	2023–present
April 1	Heavenly Delusion	Tokyo MX, Disney+, Hulu	2023
April 1	Hell's Paradise	TV Tokyo, Crunchyroll	2023–2026
April 2	Royal Crackers	Adult Swim	2023–2024
April 4	Skip and Loafer	Tokyo MX, Crunchyroll	2023–present
April 8	Mashle: Magic and Muscles	Tokyo MX, Crunchyroll, Toonami	2023–present
April 10	Total Drama Island	Cartoon Network, Max	2023–present
April 11	Insomniacs After School	TV Tokyo, Hidive	2023
April 12	Oshi no Ko	Tokyo MX, Abema, Hidive	2023–present
April 20	Fired on Mars	HBO Max	2023–present
April 28	Frog and Toad	Apple TV+	2023–present
May 4	Star Wars: Young Jedi Adventures	Disney+, Disney Junior	2023–2025
May 5	Unicorn: Warriors Eternal	Adult Swim	2023–present
May 12	Mulligan	Netflix	2023–2024
May 15	Lego Dreamzzz	Netflix, Amazon Prime Video, YouTube	2023–present
May 18	Kitti Katz	Netflix	2023
May 23	Gremlins: Secrets of the Mogwai	Cartoon Network, Max	2023–2025
May 23	Clone High	Max	2023–2024
May 25	Dino Pops	Peacock	2023–present
May 26	Quartz Quest	YouTube	2023
May 26	Quest Paralela	YouTube	2023–present
June 1	Ninjago: Dragons Rising	Netflix	2023–present
June 8	Hailey's On It!	Disney Channel	2023–2024
June 9	This World Can't Tear Me Down	Netflix	2023
June 14	Pupstruction	Disney Junior	2023–present
June 19	Not Quite Narwhal	Netflix	2023–2024
June 22	Skull Island	Netflix	2023
July 5	My Happy Marriage	Tokyo MX, Netflix	2023–present
July 6	Wake Up, Carlo!	Netflix	2023
July 7	My Adventures with Superman	Adult Swim	2023–present
July 9	Zom 100: Bucket List of the Dead	MBS, TBS, Hulu, Netflix, Crunchyroll, Toonami	2023
July 21	Praise Petey	Freeform	2023
July 24	Dew Drop Diaries	Netflix	2023
July 28	Captain Fall	Netflix	2023
August 9	Strange Planet	Apple TV+	2023
August 10	Mech Cadets	Netflix	2023
August 18	Playdate with Winnie the Pooh	Disney Junior	2023–present
August 31	Adventure Time: Fionna and Cake	Max	2023–present
September 8	Tiny Toons Looniversity	Cartoon Network, Max	2023–2025
September 20	Jessica's Big Little World	Cartoon Network	2023–2024
September 21	Young Love	Max	2023–present
September 24	Krapopolis	Fox	2023–present
September 25	Little Baby Bum: Music Time	Netflix	2023–present
September 28	Castlevania: Nocturne	Netflix	2023–2025
September 29	Frieren: Beyond Journey's End	Nippon TV, Crunchyroll	2023–present
October 2	Fright Krewe	Hulu, Peacock	2023–2024
October 12	Good Night World	Netflix	2023
October 12	Superbuns	Peacock	2023–present
October 13	The Amazing Digital Circus	YouTube	2023–2026
October 19	Captain Laserhawk: A Blood Dragon Remix	Netflix	2023
October 19	Scavengers Reign	Max	2023–present
October 22	The Apothecary Diaries	Nippon TV, Crunchyroll	2023–present
October 26	Lil' Stompers	Peacock	2023–present
October 26	Pluto	Netflix	2023
October 27	Curses!	Apple TV+	2023–2024
October 27	Well-Versed	Nickelodeon	2023–present
November 2	Unicorn Academy	Netflix	2023–present
November 3	Blue Eye Samurai	Netflix	2023–present
November 11	The Heroic Quest of the Valiant Prince Ivandoe	Cartoon Network	2023–2026
November 17	Scott Pilgrim Takes Off	Netflix	2023
November 17	Cocomelon Lane	Netflix	2023–present
December 15	Carol & The End of The World	Netflix	2023
December 28	Pokémon Concierge	Netflix	2023

== Television series endings ==
Date	Title	Channel, Streaming	Year	Notes
January 20	Puppy Dog Pals	Disney Junior	2017–2023	Ended
February 3	Pinecone & Pony	Apple TV+	2022–2023	Ended
February 16	Aggretsuko	Netflix	2018–2023	Ended
February 17	Animaniacs	Hulu	2020–2023	Ended
February 24	Oddballs	Netflix	2022–2023	Ended
March 6	Ridley Jones	Netflix	2021–2023	Ended
March 17	Agent Elvis	Netflix	2023	Ended
March 24	Eureka!	Disney Junior	2022–2023	Ended
April 8	The Owl House	Disney Channel	2020–2023	Ended
May 5	Harriet the Spy	Apple TV+	2021–2023	Ended
May 11	Ultraman	Netflix	2019–2023	Ended
June 9	Human Resources	Netflix	2022–2023	Ended
June 23	SciGirls	PBS Kids	2010–2023	Ended
June 30	Bubble Guppies	Nickelodeon	2011–2023	Ended
July 7	Big Nate	Paramount+	2022–2023	Ended
July 27	Looney Tunes Cartoons	Max	2020–2023	Ended
July 28	Captain Fall	Netflix	2023	Cancelled
July 28	The Wonderful World of Mickey Mouse	Disney+	2020–2023	Ended
August 3	HouseBroken	Fox	2021–2023	Cancelled
August 11	Summer Camp Island	Cartoon Network	2018–2023	Ended
August 17	My Dad the Bounty Hunter	Netflix	2023	Cancelled
August 18	Praise Petey	Freeform	2023	Cancelled
September 1	Disenchantment	Netflix	2018–2023	Ended
September 7	Kung Fu Panda: The Dragon Knight	Netflix	2022–2023	Ended
October 19	Captain Laserhawk: A Blood Dragon Remix	Netflix	2023	Ended
November 23	My Little Pony: Make Your Mark	Netflix	2022–2023	Ended
November 24	Mecha Builders	PBS Kids	2022–2023	Ended
November 27	Go, Dog. Go!	Netflix	2021–2023	Ended
December 1	Lucas the Spider	Family Channel / Cartoonito	2021–2023	Ended
December 7	Hilda	Netflix	2018–2023	Ended
December 14	DreamWorks Dragons: The Nine Realms	Hulu, Peacock	2021–2023	Ended
December 17	Archer	FXX	2009–2023	Ended

== Television season premieres ==
Date	Title	Season	Channel, Streaming
February 1	The Proud Family: Louder and Prouder	2	Disney+
February 8	South Park	26	Comedy Central
February 17	Animaniacs (2020)	3	Hulu
April 1–2	The Ghost and Molly McGee	2	Disney Channel, Disney+
April 14	Rugrats (2021)	2	Paramount+
May 17	The Loud House	7	Nickelodeon
May 27	Paw Patrol	10	TVO (Note: Season later concluded in the US on Nickelodeon on July 10th.)
June 17	We Baby Bears	2	Cartoon Network
July 7	Big Nate	2	Paramount+
July 10	Craig of the Creek	5	Cartoon Network
July 13	Sonic Prime	2	Netflix
July 15	Strawberry Shortcake: Berry in the Big City	3	YouTube, Family Jr.
July 24	Futurama	8 (Note: Revived for 2 more seasons after its first revival run ended in 2013.)	Hulu
July 26	The Patrick Star Show	2	Nickelodeon
September 23	Big City Greens	4	Disney Channel
October 1	Bob's Burgers	14	Fox
October 1	Family Guy	22	Fox
October 1	The Simpsons	35	Fox
October 15	Rick and Morty	7	Adult Swim (Cartoon Network)
October 20	Big Mouth	7	Netflix
September 23	Chibiverse	2	Disney Channel
November 2	SpongeBob SquarePants	14	Nickelodeon
December 7	Hilda	3	Netflix

== Television season finales ==
Date	Title	Season	Channel, Streaming
February 1	The Proud Family: Louder and Prouder	2	Disney+
March 4	Chibiverse	1	Disney Channel
March 18	Strawberry Shortcake: Berry in the Big City	2	YouTube, Family Jr.
March 25	Big City Greens	3	Disney Channel
March 29	South Park	26	Comedy Central
April 12	Moon Girl and Devil Dinosaur	1	Disney+
April 22	Paw Patrol	9	TVO (Note: Season later concluded in the US on Nickelodeon on July 31st.)
May 7	Family Guy	21	Fox
May 13	We Baby Bears	1	Cartoon Network
May 16	The Loud House	6	Nickelodeon
May 21	Bob's Burgers	13	Fox
May 21	The Great North	3	Fox
May 21	The Simpsons	34	Fox
May 26	Kamp Koral: SpongeBob's Under Years	1	Paramount+
May 29	Craig of the Creek	4	Cartoon Network
June 24	Helluva Boss	1	YouTube
July 13	Sonic Prime	2	Netflix
July 14	Craig of the Creek	5	Cartoon Network
July 25	The Patrick Star Show	1	Nickelodeon
September 8	Tiny Toons Looniversity	1	Max
September 25	Futurama	8	Hulu
October 20	Big Mouth	7	Netflix
November 1	SpongeBob SquarePants	13	Nickelodeon
December 9	Hamster & Gretel	1	Disney Channel
December 17	Rick and Morty	7	Adult Swim (Cartoon Network)

== Deaths ==
=== January ===
- January 5: Earl Boen, American actor (voice of Red Skull and the Beyonder in Spider-Man, Santa Claus in A Pinky and the Brain Christmas and A Johnny Bravo Christmas, Leonard Kanifky in Bonkers, Rhino in Batman: The Animated Series, Horace Bleakman in Clifford the Big Red Dog, Captain Montecero in The New Adventures of Zorro, Doctor, Monster, Mr. Hobson and TV Narrator in Grim & Evil and The Grim Adventures of Billy & Mandy, Mr. Gordon and The Ghost of Chef Pierre Goulash in the A Pup Named Scooby-Doo episode "Robopup", Vice President Obsequious in The Sylvester & Tweety Mysteries episode "Spooker of the House", Simon Stagg in the Justice League episode "Metamorphosis", William Howard Taft in the Time Squad episode "White House Weirdness", Nick in the Buzz Lightyear of Star Command episode "Holiday Time", continued voice of Senor Senior Sr. in Kim Possible, additional voices in Bruno the Kid, The Fantastic Voyages of Sinbad the Sailor, What-a-Mess, Capitol Critters, Problem Child and The Addams Family), dies from lung cancer at age 81.
- January 7: Adam Rich, American actor (voice of Presto in Dungeons & Dragons), dies at age 54.
- January 11:
  - Carole Cook, American actress (voice of Pearl Gesner in Home on the Range), dies at age 98.
  - Charles Kimbrough, American actor (voice of Victor in The Hunchback of Notre Dame and The Hunchback of Notre Dame II, Mort Chalk in Recess: School's Out, Rainbow Face #1 in The Land Before Time VII: The Stone of Cold Fire, Brain Pod #29 in Buzz Lightyear of Star Command: The Adventure Begins, Dr. Bob in the Mighty Max episode "Scorpio Rising", Sandy Dreckman in the Pinky and the Brain episode "You'll Never Eat Food Pellets in This Town Again!", Jim Dial in the Family Guy episode "A Picture is Worth $1,000 Bucks", Stage Gordon in the Batman Beyond episode "Out of the Past", Pat Jensen in The Zeta Project episode "On the Wire", narrator in The Angry Beavers episode "Canucks Amuck", additional voices in Whisper of the Heart), dies at age 86.
- January 18: David Crosby, American singer, guitarist, and songwriter (voiced himself in The Simpsons episodes "Marge in Chains" and "Homer's Barbershop Quartet"), dies at age 81.
- January 20: Sal Bando, American former professional baseball player (voiced himself in The Simpsons episode "Regarding Margie"), dies at age 78.
- January 22: Bill Dennis, American animation executive (founder of Toonz Media Group), dies at age 80.
- January 25: Cindy Williams, American actress and producer (voice of Shirley Feeney in Laverne & Shirley in the Army, Gerri Poveri in The Magic School Bus episode "Ups and Downs"), dies at age 75.
- January 27: Robert Dalva, American editor (Star Wars: The Clone Wars), dies at age 80.

=== February ===
- February 10: Len Birman, Canadian-American actor (voice of Rocket Robin Hood in Rocket Robin Hood, Hercules and Hank Pym in The Marvel Super Heroes), dies at age 90.
- February 11:
  - Austin Majors, American actor (voice of young Jim Hawkins in Treasure Planet, Blue Teammate #3 in The Ant Bully, Thomas in the American Dad! episode "Of Ice and Men"), dies at age 27.
  - James Flynn, Irish producer (Disenchanted), dies at age 57.
- February 12: David Jolicoeur, American musician and member of De La Soul (voiced himself in the Teen Titans Go! episode "Don't Press Play"), dies at age 54.
- February 13: Leiji Matsumoto, Japanese animator and manga artist (Space Battleship Yamato, Galaxy Express 999, Space Pirate Captain Harlock, Queen Emeraldas, Queen Millennia, worked with the band Daft Punk on their animated music videos and their full-length film Interstella 5555: The 5tory of the 5ecret 5tar 5ystem), dies at age 85.
- February 15:
  - Dario Penne, Italian actor (Italian dub voice of Bender in Futurama, Finn McMissile in Cars 2, Agent K in Men in Black: The Series, and Django in Ratatouille), dies at age 84.
  - Raquel Welch, American singer and actress (voice of Shelly Millstone in Hollyrock-a-Bye Baby and La Madrasta in Happily Ever After: Fairy Tales for Every Child), dies at age 82.
- February 19:
  - Jansen Panettiere, American actor (voice of Truman X in The X's, Periwinkle in season 6 of Blue's Clues, young Rodney Copperbottom in Robots, Shovelmouth Boy in Ice Age: The Meltdown), dies at age 28.
  - Richard Belzer, American actor (voice of Loogie in the South Park episode "The Tooth Fairy's Tats 2000"), dies at age 78.
- February 22: Kristina Holland, American actress (voice of April Stewart in The Funky Phantom, Stephanie in Butch Cassidy and the Sundance Kids, Alice Boyle in Wait Till Your Father Gets Home), dies at age 78.
- February 24: Walter Mirisch, American film producer (The Pink Panther), dies at age 101.
- February 25: Gordon Pinsent, Canadian actor, writer, director and singer (voice of the title character in Babar, Babar: The Movie, Babar: King of the Elephants and Babar and the Adventures of Badou, Captain Efraim Longstocking in Pippi Longstocking, Harry Freelove, The Barber in Pirate's Passage), dies at age 92.
- February 27: Burny Mattinson, American writer, director, and animator (Walt Disney Animation Studios), dies at age 87.

=== March ===
- March 3: Tom Sizemore, American actor (voice of Rex Mason / Metamorpho in the Justice League episode "Metamorphosis"), dies at age 61.
- March 5: Takahiro Kimura, Japanese animator (City Hunter, Idol Densetsu Eriko, Mobile Suit Victory Gundam) and character designer (Betterman, Code Geass, Code Geass: Lelouch of the Re;surrection, The King of Braves GaoGaiGar, Mobile Suit Gundam Hathaway, Xenoblade Chronicles 2), dies from amyloidosis at age 58.
- March 7: Ian Falconer, American author and illustrator (creator of Olivia), dies at age 63.
- March 13: Rolly Crump, American animator and designer (Walt Disney Company), dies at age 93.
- March 17:
  - Lance Reddick, American actor (voice of General Lunaris in DuckTales, Falcon in The Avengers: Earth's Mightiest Heroes, Cutler in Tron: Uprising, Ra's al Ghul in Beware the Batman, Agent Clappers in Paradise PD, Alan Rails in the Rick and Morty episode "Vindicators 3: The Return of Worldender"), dies at age 60.
  - Raoul Servais, Belgian animator, animated film director and comic artist (Chromophobia, Harpya), dies at age 94.
- March 20: Michael Reaves, American television writer (Gargoyles, Batman: The Animated Series, The Smurfs, Teenage Mutant Ninja Turtles, The Real Ghostbusters, My Little Pony, Fox's Peter Pan & the Pirates, Spider-Man Unlimited), dies at age 72.
- March 21: Charles E. Bastien, Canadian animation director (PAW Patrol, The Magic School Bus, Little Bear, Braceface, Mike the Knight), dies at age 60.
- March 23: Brendan O'Brien, American voice actor (provided additional voices for Todd McFarlane's Spawn), dies at age 60.
- March 25: Leo D. Sullivan, American animator (Fat Albert and the Cosby Kids, The Transformers, BraveStarr, The Incredible Hulk, The New Adventures of Flash Gordon), dies at age 82.

=== April ===
- April 1: Yasumichi Kushida, Japanese voice actor (voice of Vice Principal in Haikyu!!, Shinobi in Naruto, dub voice of Hulk in The Avengers: Earth's Mightiest Heroes, Avengers Assemble, Ultimate Spider-Man, and Hulk and the Agents of S.M.A.S.H.), dies at age 46.
- April 5: Bill Butler, American cinematographer (The Secret of NIMH, An American Tail), dies at age 101.
- April 6:
  - Bruce Petty, Australian political cartoonist, sculptor and animated film director (Leisure, Global Haywire), dies at age 93.
  - Michael Lerner, American actor (voice of Mayor Ebert in Godzilla: The Series, Producer in 101 Dalmatians II: Patch's London Adventure), dies at age 81.
  - Bob Heatlie, Scottish songwriter, record producer and composer (The Trap Door, HIT Entertainment, Kipper, Little Robots), dies at age 76.
- April 9: Donald W. Ernst, American editor and producer (Ralph Bakshi, The Walt Disney Company), dies at age 89.
- April 14: Murray Melvin, English actor (voice of Lucius in Oscar's Orchestra), dies at age 90.
- April 22: Barry Humphries, Australian actor, author and satirist (voice of Bruce in Finding Nemo, Brauilo in Justin and the Knights of Valour, Wombo in Blinky Bill the Movie, narrator in Mary and Max), dies at age 89.
- April 25:
  - Paul van Vliet, Dutch comedian, actor and singer (voice of King Radboud in Alfred J. Kwak), dies at age 87.
  - Harry Belafonte, Jamaican-American Calypso singer (voice of The Magician in the Happily Ever After: Fairy Tales for Every Child episode "Jack and the Beanstalk", the title character in the PB&J Otter episode "The Ice Moose"), dies at age 96.
- April 26: Cilia van Dijk, Dutch film producer (Anna & Bella), dies at age 81.
- April 27: Jerry Springer, English-American broadcaster, journalist, actor, producer, and politician (portrayed himself in the Happy! episode "What Smiles Are For", voiced himself in The Simpsons episode "Treehouse of Horror IX"), dies at age 79.
- April 30: Patricia Hamilton, Canadian actress (voice of Mother Nature in A Miser Brothers' Christmas, Rachel Lynde in Anne of Green Gables: The Animated Series), dies at age 86.

=== May ===
- May 1: Per Åhlin, Swedish artist and animated film director (Dunderklumpen!, The Journey to Melonia), dies at age 91.
- May 2: Barbara Bryne, British-American actress (voice of Urgl in The Neverending Story), dies at age 94.
- May 5: Pauline Newstone, Canadian actress (voice of Airazor in Beast Wars: Transformers, Frieza in the Ocean Productions dub of Dragon Ball Z, Agatha Harkness in X-Men: Evolution, Heka in Mummies Alive!), dies at age 80.
- May 7: Stanisław Lenartowicz, Polish animator, dies at age 83.
- May 10: Rolf Harris, Australian musician, actor and TV host (voice of Ralph Morris in Fetch the Vet, narrator in Olive the Ostrich), dies at age 93.
- May 14: Samantha Weinstein, Canadian actress (voice of Chiku in Babar and the Adventures of Badou, Sloane in D.N. Ace, Mindy Gelato in The ZhuZhus, Gina and Harmony in Let's Go Luna!, Swan Maiden in Super Why!, Clara Tinhorn in Dino Ranch, Janine in Gerald McBoing-Boing), dies from colon infection caused by ovarian cancer at age 28.
- May 21: Ray Stevenson, Irish actor (voice of Gar Saxon in the Star Wars franchise, Punisher in The Super Hero Squad Show episode "Night at the Sanctorum!"), dies at age 58.
- May 24: Tina Turner, Swiss-American singer and actress (performed the song "Great Spirits" in Brother Bear), dies at age 83.

=== June ===
- June 1: Cynthia Weil, American songwriter (wrote "Somewhere Out There" from An American Tail), dies at age 82.
- June 2: Yukiko Takayama, Japanese screenwriter (Monarch: The Big Bear of Tallac), dies at age 83.
- June 7: The Iron Sheik, Iranian-American professional wrestler (voiced himself in the Robot Chicken episode "El Skeletorito"), dies at age 81.
- June 9:
  - Ian McGinty, American comic book artist and writer (Invader Zim, Adventure Time), dies at age 38.
  - Joy Rosen, American executive (co-founder of Portfolio Entertainment), dies at age 65.
- June 12:
  - John Romita Sr., American comic book artist (story and art consultant on Spider-Man), dies at 93.
  - Treat Williams, American actor (voice of Professor Milo in Batman: The Animated Series, himself in The Simpsons episode "A Totally Fun Thing That Bart Will Never Do Again"), dies in a motorcycle accident at age 71.
- June 16:
  - Paxton Whitehead, English actor (voice of King Salazar in Wakko's Wish, Commander in The Real Adventures of Jonny Quest episode "The Darkest Fathoms"), dies from complications from a fall at age 85.
  - Angela Thorne, British actress (voice of the Queen of England in The BFG), dies at age 84.
- June 18: Rupert van der Linden, Dutch comic artist, illustrator, painter and animated film director (De Goochelaar Ontgoocheld), dies at age 92.
- June 27: Joana Brito, Mexican actress (Latin American dub voice of Mama Odie in The Princess and the Frog, Eema in Dinosaur, Frances Albacore in Cats Don't Dance, Zira in The Lion King II: Simba's Pride, Morgana in The Little Mermaid II: Return to the Sea), dies at age 76.
- June 29:
  - Alan Arkin, American actor, director and screenwriter (voice of Wild Knuckles in Minions: The Rise of Gru, Schmendrick in The Last Unicorn, J. D. Salinger in BoJack Horseman), dies at age 89.
  - Don Kennedy, American radio and television personality and voice talent (voice of Tansit in Space Ghost Coast to Coast), dies at age 93.

=== July ===
- July 1: Ippei Kuri, Japanese manga artist (Science Ninja Team Gatchaman (also known as Battle of the Planets), Speed Racer), co-founder of Tatsunoko Production, dies at age 83.
- July 5: Coco Lee, Chinese-American singer and songwriter (Mandarin dub voice of Fa Mulan in Mulan), dies at age 48.
- July 6: Jimmy Weldon, American actor (voice of Yakky Doodle in The Yogi Bear Show, Solomon Grundy in Challenge of the Superfriends), dies at age 99.
- July 9: Manny Coto, American television writer and producer (Tales from the Cryptkeeper), dies at age 62.
- July 10:
  - Randy Fullmer, American animator and producer (The Walt Disney Company), dies at age 73.
  - Bob Segarini, American-Canadian musician and radio presenter (voice of Woodchuck Berry in The Raccoons episode "Second Chance!"), dies at age 77.
- July 11: Michael Bakewell, British television producer (Space Adventure Cobra: The Movie, Project A-ko, Patlabor: The Movie), dies at age 92.
- July 12: Daniel Goldberg, Canadian producer and screenwriter (Space Jam, Heavy Metal, Mummies Alive!, Extreme Ghostbusters, Alienators: Evolution Continues), dies at age 74.
- July 14: Sergey Seryogin, Russian animation director and writer (Alice's Birthday), dies at age 56.
- July 16: Ellen Fitzhugh, American lyricist (The Great Mouse Detective), dies at age 81.
- July 19: Mark Thomas, British composer (Shaun the Sheep, The Magic Roundabout), dies at age 67.
- July 21:
  - Tony Bennett, American singer (voiced himself in The Simpsons, provided Bobgoblin's singing voice in the Wallykazam! episode "Wally Saves the Trollidays"), dies at age 96.
  - Jerome Coopersmith, American dramatist ('Twas the Night Before Christmas), dies at age 97.
- July 23:
  - Pamela Blair, American actress (voice of Flight Attendant and White House Tour Guide in Beavis and Butt-Head Do America), dies at age 73.
  - Inga Swenson, American actress (voice of Grandma Helga in Life with Louie), dies at age 90.
- July 25: Michele Kalamera, Italian actor and voice actor (Italian dub voice of Razoul in Aladdin, The King in Cars, Commander Bristle in Tom and Jerry: Blast Off to Mars, Rourke in Atlantis: The Lost Empire, Baloo in TaleSpin), dies at age 84.
- July 30: Paul Reubens, American actor and comedian (voice of Bat-Mite in Batman: The Brave and the Bold, Lock in The Nightmare Before Christmas, Fife in Beauty and the Beast: The Enchanted Christmas, Jokey Smurf in The Smurfs, and The Smurfs 2, Dennis in Teacher's Pet, Reuben in Chowder, Hermie the Elf in Rugrats, Pontius Pig in The Tom and Jerry Show, Pat in Bob's Burgers, Pavel in Tron: Uprising, Golly Gopher in Re-Animated, RX-24 in the Star Wars Rebels episode "Droids in Distress"), dies from cancer at age 70.

=== August ===
- August 1: Beth Porter, American-British actress (voice of Jadis the White Witch in The Lion, the Witch and the Wardrobe), dies at age 81.
- August 3: Carl Davis, American composer and conductor (Ethel & Ernest), dies at age 86.
- August 5: Arthur Schmidt, American film editor (Who Framed Roger Rabbit), dies at age 86.
- August 7: William Friedkin, American film director (voice of Dr. Kenneth Humphries in The Simpsons episode "Treehouse of Horror XXVIII"), dies at age 87.
- August 8: Johnny Hardwick, American television producer, writer, and voice actor (Dale Gribble in King of the Hill), dies at age 64.
- August 16: Jürgen Kluckert, German actor (German dub voice of Mr. Krabs in SpongeBob SquarePants, The King in Cinderella II: Dreams Come True and Cinderella III: A Twist in Time, Scuttle in The Little Mermaid, Genie in Aladdin, Mr. Swackhammer in Space Jam, Vladimir in Anastasia, Finis Everglot in Corpse Bride, Doctor Robotnik in Sonic Underground, King Dedede in Kirby: Right Back at Ya!), dies at age 79.
- August 19:
  - Ron Cephas Jones, American actor (voice of Captain Aldo in the Amphibia episode "Barrel's Warhammer"), dies at age 66.
  - Nizo Yamamoto, Japanese art director (Studio Ghibli, The Castle of Cagliostro, Joseph: King of Dreams, Highlander: The Search for Vengeance, Little Nemo: Adventures in Slumberland, The Girl Who Leapt Through Time), dies from stomach cancer at age 70.
- August 24: Arleen Sorkin, American actress (voice of Harley Quinn in the DC Animated Universe, Ms. Bambi in Batman: Mask of the Phantasm, Veronica in the Taz-Mania episode "Bewitched Bob"), and screenwriter (Tiny Toon Adventures), dies from complications from multiple sclerosis at age 67.
- August 26: Bob Barker, American game show host (voice of Bob Barnacle in the SpongeBob SquarePants episode "Sanctuary!", himself in the Futurama episode "The Lesser of Two Evils", and the Family Guy episodes "Screwed the Pooch", "The Fat Guy Strangler" and "Tales of a Third Grade Nothing"), dies at age 99.
- August 27: Mariella Trejos, Colombian-Peruvian actress (Latin American dub voice of Ryce Newton in Beethoven), dies at age 75.

=== September ===
- September 1: Jimmy Buffett, American singer-songwriter (performed the song "If I'm Gonna Eat Somebody (It Might As Well Be You)" from FernGully: The Last Rainforest), dies at age 76.
- September 4: Steve Harwell, American singer and member of Smash Mouth (voice of Papa Bear, Drum Bear and Keyboard Bear in the We Bare Bears episode "Pizza Band", himself in the Kim Possible episode "Queen Bebe" and the What's New, Scooby-Doo? episode "Reef Grief!", performed "All Star" and a cover of "I'm a Believer" in Shrek, and "Hot" in Highway 35), dies from liver failure at age 56.
- September 8: Paweł Sanakiewicz, Polish actor (Polish dub voice of James P. Sullivan in Monsters, Inc. and Monsters University, Pacha in The Emperor's New Groove and Kronk's New Groove, Max Tennyson in Ben 10 and Ben 10: Alien Force, Hades in Justice League Unlimited), dies at age 68.
- September 12: Pete Kozachik, American visual effects artist (The Nightmare Before Christmas, Corpse Bride, Coraline, James and the Giant Peach, Monkeybone), dies at age 72.
- September 13: Pepe Soriano, Argentine actor (voice of Dr. Crux in Cóndor Crux, la leyenda), dies at age 93.
- September 14: Michael McGrath, American actor (voice of Adult Brendan in The Secret of Kells, additional voices in Wolfwalkers), dies at age 65.
- September 16: Dick Curtis, American actor (voice of Motormouse in Cattanooga Cats, Pappy Wilson in Skyhawks), dies at age 95.
- September 25: David McCallum, Scottish actor and musician (voice of C.A.R. in The Replacements, Professor Paradox in the Ben 10 franchise, Alfred Pennyworth in Batman: Gotham Knight and the DC Animated Movie Universe, Zeus in Wonder Woman, Merlin in the Batman: The Brave and the Bold episode "Day of the Dark Knight!"), dies at age 90.
- September 27: Michael Gambon, Irish-English actor (voice of Franklin Bean in Fantastic Mr. Fox, Badger in The Wind in the Willows, Master Martin in A Monkey's Tale, Ghost of Christmas Present in Christmas Carol: The Movie), dies from pneumonia at age 82.
- September 30: Thomas Danneberg, German actor (German dub voice of Weaver in Antz, King Harold in the Shrek franchise), dies at age 81.

=== October ===
- October 4: Shawna Trpcic, American costume designer (The SpongeBob Movie: Sponge on the Run), dies at age 56.
- October 9: Keith Giffen, American comic book artist, television writer (The Real Ghostbusters, Ed, Edd n Eddy, Hi Hi Puffy AmiYumi) and storyboard artist (Spider-Man Unlimited, Batman Beyond, Static Shock), dies of a stroke at age 70.
- October 10: Shirley Jo Finney, American actress and stage director (voice of Chaplin in Hey Good Lookin'), dies at age 74.
- October 11: Cal Wilson, New Zealand comedian and actress (voice of Petal and Thorn in Kitty Is Not a Cat), dies at age 53.
- October 15: Suzanne Somers, American actress, author, singer, businesswoman and health spokesperson (voiced herself in The Simpsons episode "The Day the Violence Died"), dies from breast cancer at age 76.
- October 16:
  - Gennady Gladkov, Soviet and Russian composer (Most, Most, Most, Most, The Bremen Town Musicians, The Blue Bird, On the Trail of the Bremen Town Musicians, eighth episode of Well, Just You Wait!, Blue Puppy, Ograblenie po..., Very Blue Beard, The New Bremen Town Musicians), dies at age 88.
  - Steven Weisberg, American film editor (Sir Billi), dies at age 68.
- October 17: Edward Bleier, American television executive (Warner Bros. Animation), dies at age 94.
- October 21:
  - Marzia Ubaldi, Italian actress (Italian dub voice of Moro in Princess Mononoke, Mama Gunda in Tarzan II, Mrs. Dilber in A Christmas Carol, Mrs. Henscher in ParaNorman), dies at age 85.
  - Stephen Kandel, American television writer (Star Trek: The Animated Series), dies at age 96.
- October 24:
  - Miyuki Ichijo, Japanese voice actress (voice of Jodie Sterling in Case Closed, Ouhi in Slayers, Encia in The Vision of Escaflowne, Howmei in Martian Successor Nadesico, Anastasia in Cowboy Bebop, Melissa Fraser in The Big O, Japanese dub voice of Marge Simpson in The Simpsons, Queen Titania in Rainbow Magic), dies at age 74.
  - Luis Pérez Pons, Venezuelan actor (Latin American dub voice of Mr. Krabs in SpongeBob SquarePants, Harvey Bullock in Batman: The Animated Series, Chief Angel Rojas in The Batman, Bibbo Bibbowski in Superman: The Animated Series, Granny Goodness in Justice League, Mr. Dickenson in Beyblade, Kamiya in Speed Grapher, Roddy MacStew in Freakazoid!, Santa Claus in Space Goofs, Ego the Living Planet in Silver Surfer, Mr. Hitcher in Tiny Toon Adventures: How I Spent My Vacation, Captain Smith in Titanic: The Legend Goes On), dies at age 72.
- October 26: Richard Moll, American actor (voice of Two-Face in the DC Animated Universe and the Batman: The Brave and the Bold episode "Chill of the Night!", Norman in Mighty Max, Abomination in The Incredible Hulk, Scorpion in Spider-Man, Vorn the Unspeakable in the Freakazoid! episode "Statuesque", Org's Dad in The Wacky Adventures of Ronald McDonald episode "The Visitors from Outer Space", Rodin Krick in The Zeta Project episode "Lost and Found", Dinky in the Happily Ever After: Fairy Tales for Every Child episode "The Pied Piper", Emperor Spooj in the Superman: The Animated Series episode "The Main Man"), dies at age 80.
- October 28: Matthew Perry, American-Canadian actor, comedian and producer (voiced himself in The Simpsons episode "Treehouse of Horror XII"), dies at age 54.

=== November ===
- November 5: Garrett Ho, American storyboard artist (Space Jam, Warner Bros. Animation, Disney Television Animation, Nickelodeon Animation Studio, Clifford the Big Red Dog, The Adventures of Brer Rabbit, Curious George 2: Follow That Monkey!, Hero: 108), dies at age 59.
- November 6: Yoshiko Miura, Japanese lyricist (wrote the theme song for Megazone 23), dies at age 74.
- November 17: Maciej Damięcki, Polish actor (Polish dub voice of Doc Brown in Back to the Future), dies at age 79.
- November 19:
  - Peter Spellos, American voice actor (voice of General Szabo in Blue Dragon, Bartley Asprius in Code Geass, Hitode in Naruto, Sky-Byte in Transformers: Robots in Disguise), dies from cancer at age 69.
  - Joss Ackland, British actor (voice of Black Rabbit in Watership Down, Brigand in The Thief and the Cobbler, Samuel and Noah in Testament: The Bible in Animation, Julius Caesar in the Shakespeare: The Animated Tales episode "Julius Caesar"), dies at age 95.
- November 23: John Bush, American television producer (The Simpsons, Family Guy, King of the Hill, Open Season: Scared Silly, Clerks: The Animated Series, Scooby-Doo! and the Gourmet Ghost, The Brave Little Toaster franchise, New Looney Tunes, X-Men: Evolution), dies at age 69.
- November 24: Bodo Wolf, German actor (German dub voice of Reggie Bellafonte in Surf's Up, Professor Von Schlemmer in Adventures of Sonic the Hedgehog), dies at age 79.
- November 27:
  - Mizuho Suzuki, Japanese actor (voice of Doctor Onishi in Akira, Japanese dub voice of the Narrator in Beauty and the Beast, Unicron in The Transformers: The Movie), dies at age 96.
  - Frances Sternhagen, American actress (voice of Mrs. Bellamy in The Simpsons episode "The Frying Game"), dies at age 93.
- November 29: Henry Kissinger, German-born American politician and diplomat (voice of Ducky Daddles in the Happily Ever After: Fairy Tales for Every Child episode "Henny Penny"), dies at age 100.

=== December ===
- December 3: Andrea Fay Friedman, American actress (voice of Ellen in the Family Guy episode "Extra Large Medium"), dies at age 53.
- December 4: Queta Lavat, Mexican actress (Latin American dub voice of Jane Jetson in The Jetsons), dies at age 94.
- December 5: Norman Lear, American television producer (Channel Umptee-3) and writer (voice of Benjamin Franklin in the South Park episode "I'm a Little Bit Country", himself in The Simpsons episode "Mr. Lisa's Opus"), dies at age 101.
- December 6:
  - Natalya Bogomolova, Russian animator (Winnie-the-Pooh, The Blue Bird, Alice's Birthday), dies at age 83.
  - Miroslawa Krajewska, Polish actress (Polish dub voice of Granny in the Looney Tunes franchise, Katara in The Legend of Korra), dies at age 83.
- December 10: Shirley Anne Field, English actress (voice of the Governess in A Monkey's Tale), dies at age 87.
- December 11: Andre Braugher, American actor (voice of Darkseid in Superman/Batman: Apocalypse, Derge in Jackie Chan Adventures, Woodchuck Coodchuck-Berkowitz in BoJack Horseman, Al Granger in Spirit Untamed, Julian Andrews in the Happily Ever After: Fairy Tales for Every Child episode "The Princess and the Pauper"), dies from lung cancer at age 61.
- December 23:
  - Philip J. Felix, American art director and character designer (Biker Mice from Mars, Hercules, Shrek), dies at age 61.
  - Richard Romanus, American actor (voice of Weehawk in Wizards, Harry Canyon in Heavy Metal, Vinnie in Hey Good Lookin'), dies at age 80.
- December 26: Tom Smothers, American comedian and musician (voice of Ted Edward Bear in The Bear Who Slept Through Christmas, Tom in the Dr. Katz, Professional Therapist episode "Ben-Centennial", himself in The Simpsons episode "Oh Brother, Where Bart Thou?"), dies at age 86.
- December 27: Mbongeni Ngema, South African musician (The Lion King), dies at age 68.
- December 30: Tom Wilkinson, English actor (voice of Joseph Goebbels in Jackboots on Whitehall, Fox in The Gruffalo and The Gruffalo's Child, Threarah in Watership Down) dies at age 75.
- December 31: Ana Ofelia Murguía, Mexican actress (voice of Mama Coco in Coco), dies at age 90.

=== Specific date unknown ===
- Julian Sands, English actor (voice of Valmont in Jackie Chan Adventures, Lancelot in the Biker Mice from Mars episode "Knights of the Round Table", Henry in the Adventures from the Book of Virtues episode "Responsibility", Creed in The Real Adventures of Jonny Quest episode "Race Against Danger"), dies in a hiking accident at age 65.

== See also ==
- 2023 in anime
- List of animated television series of 2023
