= Wendy Testaburger =

Fictional character from South Park

- South Park character
- First appearance: The Spirit of Christmas (1995)
- Created by: Trey Parker; Matt Stone
- Designed by: Trey Parker; Matt Stone
- Voiced by: Karri Turner (unaired pilot); Mary Kay Bergman (1997–1999); Eliza Schneider (1999–2003); Mona Marshall (2003–2004); April Stewart (2004–present)

In-universe information
- Full name: Wendy Testaburger
- Aliases: Call Girl; Wendyl
- Gender: Female
- Occupation: Elementary school student Harvard University professor (future)
- Family: Mr. Testaburger (father); Alexis Testaburger (mother)
- Significant others: Stan Marsh (on-again, off-again partner; lovers in the future); Darwin (ex-future husband)
- Relatives: Grandma Testaburger (grandmother; deceased)
- Education: South Park Elementary
- Residence: South Park, Colorado, United States

Wendy Testaburger (/tɛstəbərɡər/) is a fictional character in the adult animated television series South Park. She has an on-and-off relationship with her boyfriend Stan Marsh. Being more intelligent and mature than her peers, Wendy finds expression in her activism, environmentalism and feminism. Wendy debuted as a nameless background character in Trey Parker and Matt Stone's 1995 college short film The Spirit of Christmas, and made her first appearance on television when South Park premiered on Comedy Central on August 13, 1997, with the episode "Cartman Gets an Anal Probe". She is currently voiced by April Stewart, and has previously been voiced by three different voice actresses in the show's run: Mary Kay Bergman, Eliza Schneider, and Mona Marshall.

== Biography ==
In South Park's first 19 seasons, Wendy attends South Park Elementary as a third-then fourth-grade student of Mr. Garrison's class – a position of his which is then replaced by Mrs. Nelson after Garrison becomes the 45th President of the United States during season 19. She resides in South Park, Colorado as the only child and daughter of Mr. and Mrs. Testaburger. In the episode "Tom's Rhinoplasty", it is revealed by Principal Victoria that her grandmother had just died, in reference to the scene in the 1986 John Hughes film Ferris Bueller's Day Off, where the nurse informs Sloane of the same news. During the show's first 58 episodes – "Cartman Gets an Anal Probe" to the season 4 episode "Fourth Grade" – Wendy is a third-grade student in Mr. Garrison's class. Starting with "Fourth Grade", Wendy's grade, along with all of the other major child characters', transfers to the fourth and remains as such due to the floating timeline of the series.

In the future, beginning with the film South Park: Post COVID, Wendy now had a husband named Darwin. At the end of the film South Park: Post COVID: The Return of COVID, she reunites with Stan, hinting at a future relationship.

== Character ==
=== Creation and design ===
In the 1995 short The Spirit of Christmas and South Park's debut episode, "Cartman Gets an Anal Probe", Wendy is composed of construction paper and animated through the use of stop motion. Starting with "Weight Gain 4000" onwards, she is animated via computer software, though her appearance is portrayed to give the impression that the show still uses its construction paper technique. In tradition of the show's animation style, Wendy is composed of simple geometrical shapes and colors, and she is not offered the same free range associated with most hand-drawn characters; her character is typically shown from one angle and animated in an intentionally crude fashion.

Wendy is usually depicted wearing winter attire consisting of a light purple jacket, yellow pants, navy blue gloves/mittens, and a pink beret. In the rare instances where Wendy is seen without her hat, she has long black hair with uneven bangs. While Mary Kay Bergman, Eliza Schneider and Mona Marshall originally voiced Wendy without any computer manipulation, April Stewart now speaks within her normal vocal range while adding a childlike inflection. The recorded audio is then edited with Pro Tools, and the pitch is altered to make the voice sound more like that of a 10-year-old.

=== Development ===
Fellow co-creator Stone has stated that Wendy's name is based on that of Wendy Westaburger, the wife of a friend from his childhood.

Wendy first appeared in the 1995 sequel to Stone and Parker's 1992 film The Spirit of Christmas, Jesus vs. Santa, which was developed after Fox executive Brian Graden paid Stone and Parker $1,000 to make another animated short as a video Christmas card that he could send to friends. In turn, the duo created the aforementioned sequel.

== Personality and traits ==
Wendy is portrayed as more level-headed and mature than her peers. In the episode "Breast Cancer Show Ever" she writes an essay in regards to breast cancer and expresses her condolences to those affected. However, Wendy is also shown to be rather narcissistic, especially when confronted with a female who she perceives to be higher than her in the social hierarchy. Examples of this can be found in the episode "Bebe's Boobs Destroy Society", in which the attention Bebe is receiving from boys prompts Wendy to get breast enhancement surgery, as well as in the episode "Tom's Rhinoplasty", in which Wendy pays to have an attractive new teacher killed under the pretende that said teacher is in love with Stan.

Due to her liberal views, Wendy frequently comes into conflict with Eric Cartman. In "Breast Cancer Show Ever", Wendy engages in a violent fight with Cartman due to his mockery of breast cancer.

Wendy tends to be outcast by her girl friends for not giving into peer pressure. In "Stupid Spoiled Whore Video Playset", she refuses to participate in the trend of emulating Paris Hilton, deeming her a bad influence on young girls, which leads to betrayal by her female peers.

Wendy has an on-again, off-again relationship with Stan Marsh. Despite their problematic relationship, Stan is still shown to have feelings for Wendy whenever the two break up. In the episode "Raisins", he is left devastated for weeks after she dumps him for Tolkien Black and joins an alliance of goth children as a result. The two restore their relationship at the end of "The List". After a second breakup (initiated by Stan in "Go Fund Yourself") and reconciliation during Season 18, she breaks up with him a third time at the end of "Skank Hunt" after giving in to pressure from her girl friends.

In the video game South Park: The Fractured but Whole, Wendy and Stan are shown together as their respective superhero alter egos, Call Girl and Toolshed, with flirtatious dialogue. Wendy and Stan resume their relationship at the end of "Deep Learning".
