= April Stewart =

American voice actress (born 1969)

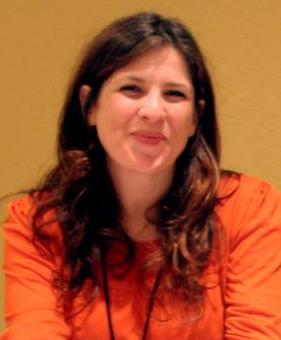
- Stewart in 2007
- Born: April 1, 1969 (age 57); Truckee, California, U.S.
- Other names: Gracie Lazar; Jane Smith
- Occupation: Voice actress
- Years active: 1980–present
- Children: 1
- Father: Freddie Stewart

April Stewart is an American voice actress best known for providing the voices of many of the female characters in the animated comedy series South Park since 2004 along with Mona Marshall and Kimberly Brooks. She also provided voices in El Tigre: The Adventures of Manny Rivera, The Legend of Korra, Infamous: Festival of Blood, and Minecraft: Story Mode.

== Early life ==
Stewart was born in Truckee, California. She was raised by her father Freddie Stewart, a singer in the Tommy Dorsey Orchestra.

== Career ==
Stewart started acting at age 12 while her voice acting career began in 2004 with South Park.

=== South Park ===
Stewart started her voice work on South Park in 2004 starting with season 8 after the departure of Eliza Schneider. Prior to this, many of the female characters on the series were originally voiced by Mary Kay Bergman. Bergman originally provided the voices for Wendy Testaburger, Liane Cartman, Sharon Marsh, Carol McCormick, Shelley Marsh, Mayor McDaniels, Principal Victoria, Veronica Crabtree, Sheila Broflovski and other various female characters. After Bergman's death in 1999, Schneider and Mona Marshall replaced Bergman for roles of many of the female characters. Marshall still provides voices in the show while Schneider later left the series after season 7 over a contract dispute in 2003. Prior to Stewart's hiring, Schneider provided the voices for Wendy, Liane, Sharon, Carol, Shelley, Mayor McDaniels, Principal Victoria, and Ms. Crabtree, while Marshall provided the voice for Sheila. Alongside both Schneider and Marshall's aforementioned characters, Schneider and Marshall also voiced various other characters in the series. After Schneider's departure, Stewart now provides the voices of Schneider's aforementioned characters, and other various characters she voiced.

=== Other roles ===
Stewart also provided the voices of Maria Rivera on Nickelodeon's El Tigre: The Adventures of Manny Rivera, Raava and Fire Lord Izumi in The Legend of Korra, the main antagonist Bloody Mary in Infamous: Festival of Blood, and Prisoner X in Minecraft: Story Mode.

== Filmography ==
=== Film ===
Year	Title	Role	Notes
2010	Kung Fu Magoo	Was-Elizabeth, Girl with Phone	Direct-to-video
2011	Mission: Impossible – Ghost Protocol	Swedish Translator	
2012	Wreck-It Ralph	Additional Voices	
2015	The SpongeBob Movie: Sponge Out of Water	Seagull	
2020	Curious George: Go West, Go Wild!	Cousin Ginny	Direct-to-video
2020	Superman: Man of Tomorrow	Mrs. Ross	Direct-to-video

=== Television ===
Year	Title	Role	Notes
2004–present	South Park	Wendy Testaburger, Liane Cartman, Sharon Marsh, Carol McCormick, Shelley Marsh, Mayor McDaniels, Principal Victoria, Various others	
2005	American Dad!	Salima, Bahir	Episode: "Stan of Arabia: Part 1"
2005	All Grown Up!	Caroler	Episode: "The Finster Who Stole Christmas"
2006	The Grim Adventures of Billy & Mandy	Waitress, Scorpion Mom, Additional Voices	Episode: "Dumb-Dumbs and Dragons/Fear and Loathing in Endsville"
2007	Danny Phantom	Pandora	Episode: "Boxed-Up Fury"
2007–2008	El Tigre: The Adventures of Manny Rivera	Maria Rivera, Nikita Suárez, CC Puede, Scout Leader	
2009	Wolverine and the X-Men	Selene	
2011	Geronimo Stilton	That Other Guy	
2011	Regular Show	Susan, Woman #1	2 episodes
2011	The Penguins of Madagascar	Mom Visitor, Kid Visitor	Episode: "Gut Instinct/I Know Why the Caged Bird Goes Insane"
2011	Phineas and Ferb: Across the 2nd Dimension	Additional Voices	TV Film
2011–2012	Phineas and Ferb	Additional Voices	
2012–2014	Winx Club	Vanessa, Eldora, Aisha's Guardian of the Sirenix	
2012–2015	Randy Cunningham: 9th Grade Ninja	Marci McFist	
2013–2014	The Legend of Korra	Raava, Fire Lord Izumi	
2014–2017	Avengers Assemble	Zarda, Lady Zartra	
2015–2017	Be Cool, Scooby-Doo!	Wendy Palloy, Bonnie, Martha, Tommy	
2016–2017	The Loud House	Bratty Kid's Mom, Scout Leader	
2016–2017	DC Super Hero Girls	Granny Goodness, Stompa, Ms. Moone	
2018	Spider-Man	Silver Sable	Episode: "Take Two"
2020	Blaze and the Monster Machines	Blaze's Mom	Episode: "The Blaze Family"
2021	South Park: Post Covid	Wendy Testaburger, Sharon Marsh Ghost, Shelly Marsh Ghost, Various others	Television special
2021	South Park: Post Covid: The Return of Covid	Wendy Testaburger, Sharon Marsh, Shelly Marsh, Various others	Television special
2022	South Park: The Streaming Wars	Sharon Marsh, Liane Cartman, Shelly Marsh, Various others	Television special
2022	South Park: The Streaming Wars Part 2	Sharon Marsh, Liane Cartman, Shelly Marsh, Various others	Television special
2023	South Park: Joining the Panderverse	Sharon Marsh, Liane Cartman, Shelly Marsh, Various others	Television special
2023	South Park (Not Suitable for Children)	Sharon Marsh, Liane Cartman, Various others	Television special
2024	South Park: The End of Obesity	Wendy Testaburger, Sharon Marsh, Liane Cartman, Shelly Marsh, Various others	Television special

=== Video games ===
Year	Title	Role	Notes
2002	Die Hard: Nakatomi Plaza	Additional Voices	
2003	Star Wars: Knights of the Old Republic	Marlena Venn, Thalia May, Twi'lek, Angry Woman, Jedi, Jedi Knight, Sith Archaeologist, Sith Student, Sith Teacher, Slave, Swoop Groupie	
2004	World of Warcraft	Garona Halforcen, Mayor Roz	
2004	A Series of Unfortunate Events	Justice Strauss	
2005	Guild Wars	Narrator	
2005	Age of Empires III	Queen Isabella	
2005	Dora the Explorer: Journey to the Purple Planet	Computadora	
2006	Dirge of Cerberus: Final Fantasy VII	Lucrecia Crescent	
2006	Final Fantasy XII	Mjrn	
2006	Marvel: Ultimate Alliance	Ms. Marvel, Namorita, Hussar	
2006	Dead or Alive Xtreme 2	Christie	
2007	Mass Effect	Nelyna, Additional Voices	
2007	The Golden Compass	Witch, Maid, Nosy Shopper	
2008	Valkyria Chronicles	Selvaria Bles, Yoko Martens	
2008	Zen Pinball	Wendy Testaburger	
2008	Kung Fu Panda: Legendary Warriors	Wu Wan, Rabbit #2, Wu Minion #2	
2009	X-Men Origins: Wolverine	Kayla Silverfox, Weapon-X Computer	
2009	Marvel: Ultimate Alliance 2	Ms. Marvel, Namorita	
2009	South Park Let's Go Tower Defense Play!	Wendy Testaburger	
2009	Brütal Legend	Battle Nuns	
2009	Dragon Age: Origins	Wise Elf Female	
2009	Avatar: The Game	RDA	
2010	Final Fantasy XIII	Cocoon Inhabitants	
2010	Valkyria Chronicles II	Selvaria Bles	
2010	Resonance of Fate	Barbarella, Veronique	
2010	God of War III	Aphrodite	
2010	Dead or Alive Paradise	Christie	
2010	Metal Gear Solid: Peace Walker	Soldiers	
2010	Fallout: New Vegas	Various	
2011	Dead or Alive: Dimensions	Christie	
2011	Infamous 2	Bloody Mary	Festival of Blood DLC
2011	The Elder Scrolls V: Skyrim	Various	Also Dragonborn expansion
2011	Star Wars: The Old Republic	Additional Voices	
2012	Guild Wars 2	The Wayfinder/Commander (Human female player character)	Also all subsequent expansions
2012	Final Fantasy XIII-2	Additional Voices	
2012	Dishonored	Empress Jessamine Kaldwin, The Heart	
2012	South Park: Tenorman's Revenge	Deery the Deer	
2013	The Cave	Twins' Mother	
2013	BioShock Infinite	Additional Voices	
2013	Marvel Heroes	Jean Grey, Psylocke	
2013	Deadpool	Death, Developer #3, Brawler Female	
2013	Infinity Blade III	Additional Voices	
2013	Tomodachi Life	Holly	
2014	South Park: The Stick of Truth	Wendy Testaburger, Sharon Marsh, Liane Cartman, Carol McCormick, Shelly Marsh, Principal Victoria, Mayor McDaniels, Various	
2014	Infamous Second Son	Female Pedestrians	
2014	Dawngate	Amarynth, Nissa	
2014	WildStar	Cassian Female, Mechari Female	
2014	Lightning Returns: Final Fantasy XIII	Carla, Scout	
2014	Destiny	Petra Venj, Awoken Pilot, City Civilian	
2014	The Legend of Korra	Female Pro-Bender	
2015	Evolve	Additional Voices	
2016	XCOM 2	US Soldier	
2016	Fallout 4: Far Harbor	Chase, Sister Aubert, Aster	
2016	Dishonored 2	Jessamine Kaldwin	
2017	Minecraft: Story Mode - Season Two	Prisoner X/Xara, Cam, Additional Voices	Season Two
2017	Destiny 2	NPC Female, Petra Venj	Also Forsaken expansion
2017	South Park: Phone Destroyer	Wendy Testaburger, Sharon Marsh, Liane Cartman, Shelly Marsh, Mayor McDaniels, Various	
2017	South Park: The Fractured but Whole	Wendy Testaburger (Call Girl), Sharon Marsh, Liane Cartman, Carol McCormick, Shelly Marsh, Mayor McDaniels, Various	
2024	South Park: Snow Day!	Liane Cartman, Various	
2025	The Outer Worlds 2	Auntie Cleo	
