= Coney Island Hot Dog Stand =

Hot dog restaurant in Bailey, Colorado, U.S.

Coordinates: 39°24′29.84″N 105°29′36.82″W

Coney Island
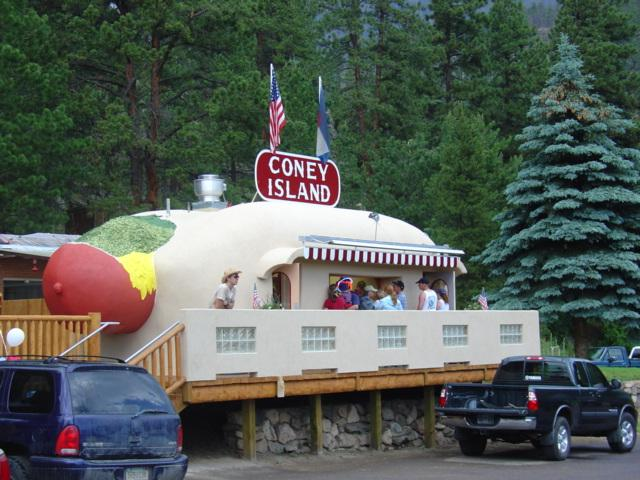
- Re-opening on July 4, 2007 in Bailey, Colorado
- Interactive map of the Coney Island area

General information
- Architectural style: Programmatic novelty architecture
- Location: Bailey, Colorado, United States
- Completed: 1966

Technical details
- Structural system: ironwork

Design and construction
- Architect: Lloyd Williams

Coney Island Colorado (commonly The Coney Island) is a 1950s diner shaped like a giant hot dog, with toppings. Located in Bailey, Colorado, the building has been called "the best example of roadside architecture in the state".

The diner has indoor seating, courtyard seating and riverside picnic table seating. The bun is 35 feet (10.67 m) long, and the hot dog 42 feet (12.8 m); the entire building weighs 18 short tons (16.1 long tons; 16.3 t).

== History ==
It was originally built in 1966 on Colfax Ave. in Denver, named The Boardwalk at Coney Island. The first owner, Marcus Shannon had intended to start a chain of eateries around the concept, and obtained a patent for the design, but the eatery closed in 1969.

In 1970, under new ownership, the stand was moved to the Rocky Mountain town of Aspen Park, along U.S. 285. Initially called Coney Island Dairy Land, it later dropped the last part of the name. Despite initial opposition, when it was put up for sale in 1999, a local campaign began to designate it a landmark and save it from destruction. The present owner purchased it for about $150,000 and added a state-of-the-art water purification system, a new secondary kitchen area and a complete restoration of the interior kitchen.

The popularity of the stand was such that its last day open in Aspen Park, "the waiting line extended literally for miles". On March 18, 2006, to make way for a bank, the stand was moved again, 17 miles down US 285 to its present location in Bailey, close to Pike National Forest.

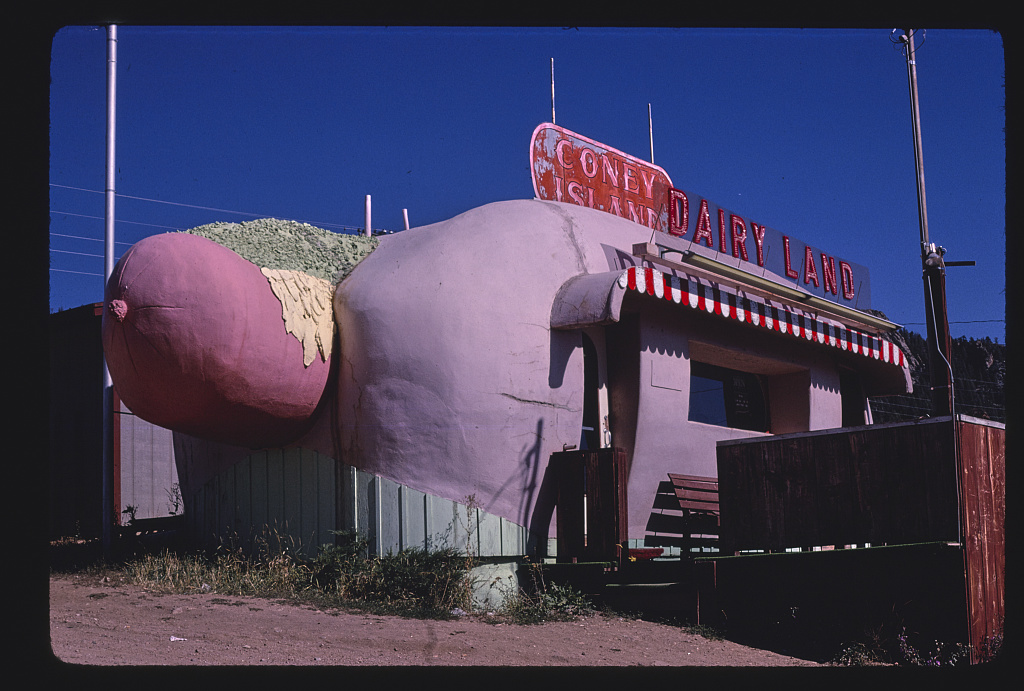
Coney Island Dairyland in Aspen Park, 1980

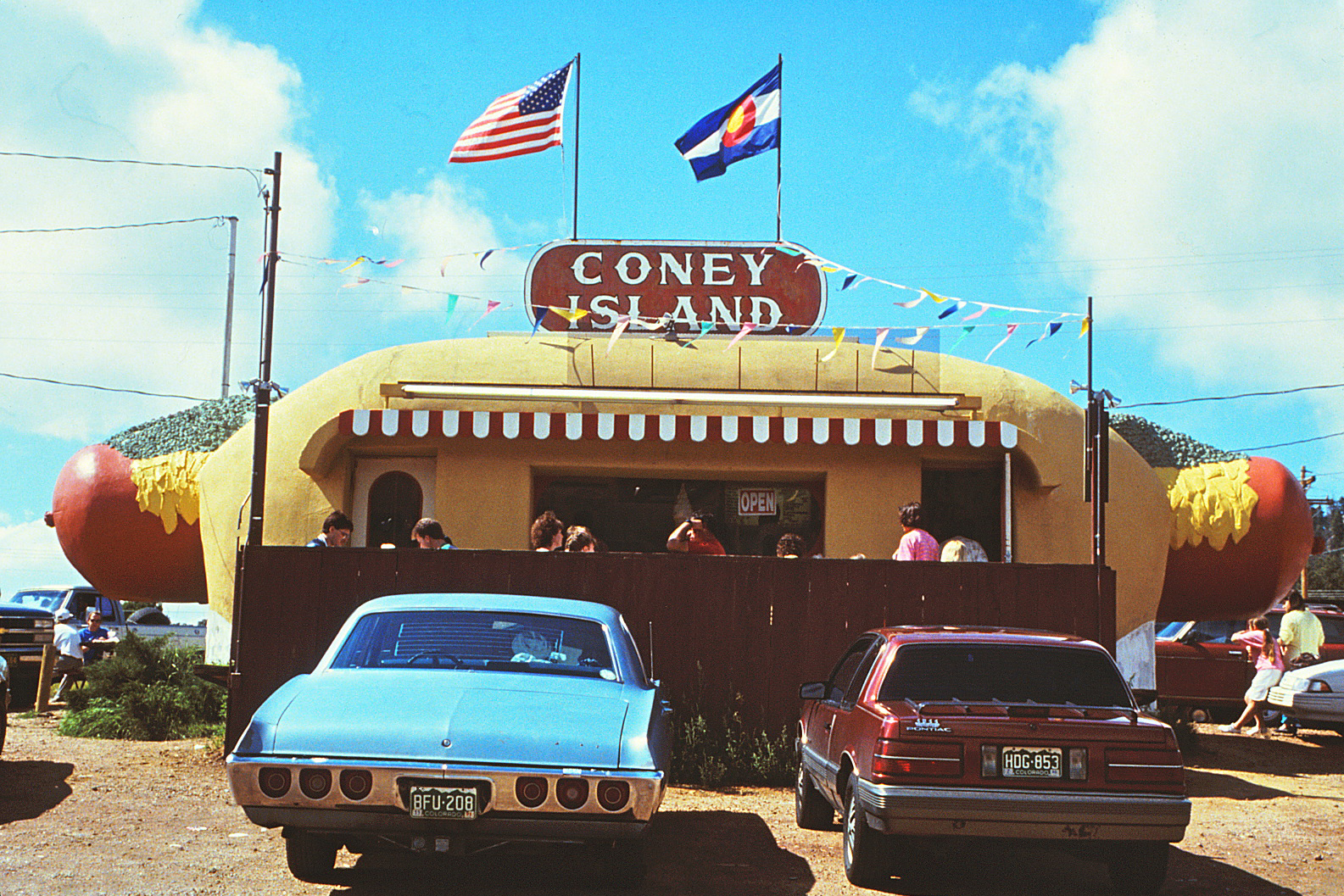
Coney Island Hot Dog Stand in Aspen Park location, 1991

== Appearances in media ==
The restaurant made an appearance on one of Dana Atchley's "Digital Postcards" titled "World's Largest". "World's Largest" and 6 more of Dana Atchley's "Digital Postcards" were later included as viewable clips on "Kid Pix Studio's" "Wacky TV" feature.

During the intro of "The Unaired Pilot" from the television series South Park, a parody of the restaurant can be seen in the background. The episode is an uncut version of "Cartman Gets an Anal Probe", and was released on DVD in 2003 with The Complete Second Season. The stand would return to the show in the season 25 episode "City People", where Cartman is forced to move in after his mom Liane loses her job. The stand remained Cartman's home until the season 26 episode "DikinBaus Hot Dogs", after he and Kenny renovate and reopen the restaurant as DikinBaus Hot Dogs and Butters, the investor and sole employee, sells it off.

It appeared in the 1999 television documentary, A Hot Dog Program, and on the 2004 television program, Hot Dog Heavens.

On September 22, 2003, it was featured in the nationally syndicated newspaper comic Zippy the Pinhead.

There is a 1/6 scale model of the Coney Island stand at Tiny Town, in Morrison, Colorado.

== See also ==
- List of hot dog restaurants
