= DikinBaus Hot Dogs =

- South Park episode
- Episode no.: Season 26; Episode 5
- Directed by: Trey Parker
- Written by: Trey Parker
- Production code: 2605
- Original air date: March 22, 2023

Episode chronology
← Previous "Deep Learning"	Next → "Spring Break"
- South Park season 26

"DikinBaus Hot Dogs" is the fifth episode of the twenty-sixth season of the American animated television series South Park, and the 324th episode of the series overall. It premiered on March 22, 2023. The episode's plot focuses on Eric Cartman's plans to renovate and open a historic restaurant in Colorado, after he is jealously spurred to do so from the paycheck Butters Stotch earns at his new ice cream parlor job. The episode was inspired by Parker's and Stone's 2021 purchase and renovation of Casa Bonita.

== Plot ==
When fourth-grader Butters Stotch shows his friends the paycheck he earned at his new ice cream parlor job, a jealous Eric Cartman is spurred to get a job at the same shop. After a few hours there, in which he displays a poor work ethic, he decides he does not want to work for a business owner to profit from his labor. He quits and convinces Butters to allocate a portion of his salary to him and Kenny McCormick so they can renovate the old hot dog stand that Cartman and his mother Liane were forced to move into when she quit her job for him in "City People".

Butters is angered, however, by the delays caused by Cartman and Kenny's laziness. Their decisions are restricted to things like giving the stand the gag name DikinBaus (as a play on the phrase "dick and balls") and ordering amusement rides built on site, which Liane disapproves of, and which drains Butters' bank account without his permission. Enraged at this, and at Cartman's excuses for his failure to hire a staff, Butters single-handedly opens the restaurant as its sole employee.

The hot dog stand is successful, and Butters gets his investment back from the bank. When the banker suggests he expand, Butters says all he wanted to do was to be an ice cream parlor employee, so he found overseas investors to buy the restaurant. Since the location is occupied by the Cartmans, the investors agree to buy back their old home. As Liane drags Cartman out of the diner and back to their old house, he screams and cries in protest, "I want DikinBaus! I want my DikinBaus!"

== Production ==
This episode was originally titled "DiKimble's Hot Dogs", but the title was changed. It features a rare appearance of Kenny McCormick being seen without his hooded jacket on and with his face exposed. The restoration of the hot dog restaurant in the episode was based on Stone and Parker's abandoned idea to save the real-life Coney Island Hot Dog Stand in Bailey, Colorado.

== Reception ==
John Schwarz of Bubbleblabber rated the episode a 7.5 out of 10, stating in his review that the episode "factors in an interesting vantage point of what's going on today with the working middle class. Entitlement for doing nothing is running rampant, new technologies are starting to automate a number of jobs anyway, and costs of living are skyrocketing. Add in the fact all of the shenanigans that the regional banking sector has been experiencing the last week or so, and there probably could have been a whole lot more for the producers to talk about here."

Max Nocerino, writing for The Future of the Force, gave the episode an "A+" rating, stating in his review: "...think back to when Cartman bought an amusement park. Or froze himself so he could get the Nintendo Wii faster. It doesn't pan out for this spoiled, insufferable brat and he is 'rewarded' with the very thing he originally wanted ... I loved this episode. It was funny with an engaging plot and had classic South Park epithets. I also like how it shined a flashlight on the work ethic of the current generation of society. Yes, South Park is ridiculous and exaggerated but, at its core, they aren't 100% wrong."

Brandon Zachary, writing for Comic Book Resources, praised the episode's conclusion as "exactly the kind of emphatic victory Butters deserves to earn" over Cartman that helped improve the series. Zachary noted that Butters' "good work ethic and mind for business show his genuine potential coming through", which he felt made Cartman's defeat funnier, a comeuppance that Zachary felt had "been a long time coming in South Park. Multiple episodes have shown him resisting Cartman's efforts to make him a worse person, and his general struggle to maintain his own sense of innocence...'DikinBaus Hot Dogs' proves that even in the often cynical world of South Park, it's possible to maintain a sense of simple ethics without letting someone like Cartman win. Furthermore, it opens up the doors for Butters in Season 27 and beyond, because he's no longer being defined by his toxic relationship with Cartman."
