= South Park: The End of Obesity =

2024 American television special

- South Park episode
- Promotional poster
- Directed by: Trey Parker
- Written by: Trey Parker
- Original air date: May 24, 2024
- Running time: 50 minutes

Episode chronology
← Previous "South Park (Not Suitable for Children)"	Next → "Sermon on the 'Mount"

"South Park: The End of Obesity" is a 2024 American adult animated comedy television special episode. It is the seventh South Park television special, and the 328th episode of the series overall. The special premiered on May 24, 2024, on Paramount+.

The special satirizes celebrities' glamorized usage of semaglutide-based weight loss drugs and Big Sugar, as well as Lizzo and the inaccessibility of the American health care system.

== Plot ==
A doctor informs fourth grader Eric Cartman and his mother Liane that his obesity is a threat to his health. When Liane says that proper diet and exercise has not worked for him, the doctor recommends a diabetes drug called semaglutide, which has been shown to help people lose weight. This prompts Cartman to fantasize about being able to viciously insult people with impunity without fear of being mocked for his weight, and even going all the way to Pakistan to continue this. However, insurance companies only cover the drug for diabetes, and are too expensive for Liane. The doctor prescribes that Cartman listen to the music of Lizzo, who frequently encourages body positivity.

This leaves Cartman despondent, so his friends, Butters Stotch and Kyle Broflovski, accompany him to an insurance company office. However, when they request to make a claim with a dejected-looking claims officer, they are sent on a labyrinthine journey through the bureaucracy of the American health care system. They ultimately decide to make it themselves after learning the raw semaglutide powder can be purchased cheaply from a factory in India and mixed with biostatic water purchased locally. Their other friends, Stan Marsh and Kenny McCormick, join them in this scheme.

Meanwhile, Randy Marsh observes many local mothers wearing crop-tops after attaining toned midriffs after losing weight with semaglutide, a recurring visual gag in the episode. After they see Randy wearing one of his daughter's crop-tops (which he has donned in order to embarrass her into dressing more conservatively), they invite him to a semaglutide-sharing party. Randy begins taking the drug himself, believing it to be a party drug that leaves him with neither a hangover nor an appetite, though this leaves his wife Sharon feeling self-conscious about her weight. She begins taking Lizzo, but it causes her to defecate from her ears. The doctor tells her she has developed "diabeartes", a form of diabetes that afflicts the ears. This means she now qualifies for semaglutide, which he prescribes her.

After the homemade semaglutide appears to be successful in curbing Cartman's appetite, Kyle decides to produce more in order to benefit people who cannot afford it. However, news of this draws the ire of a sugar industry cartel consisting of mascots of breakfast cereals and sugary snacks. In addition, when a government crackdown in response to semaglutide abuse leaves the mothers without their supply, they and Randy begin robbing pharmacies, and then Kyle and his friends. The boys' supply is then destroyed when the sugar mascots, posing as "body positivity activists", attack the Indian factory, murdering the workers and burning the building to the ground.

Kyle finds and purchases a truckload of semaglutide powder from another supplier in North Carolina, but it is carjacked by Randy and the mothers. However, Randy realizes that what the mothers are doing is wrong and steals the truck without them. A violent chase ensues, which is joined by the boys, and then by the sugary mascots. Though Kenny is killed by Tony the Tiger for throwing him out of the truck and hitting a car windshield, Randy and the boys escape their pursuers, but when they open the truck, they find that the only thing inside is the insurance claims agent, who tells them that the insurance company works with the supplier, which will mean another trip through the American healthcare system.

Before Sharon takes her first injection, Randy stops her, confessing that he has been using it himself. Surprised at how sympathetic she is to his desire to use it, he realizes that she is the coolest woman he knows, and does not want her to change at all. Deciding that semaglutide drugs are bad, he invites her to go to a Holiday Inn and take MDMA together like they did in college. Meanwhile, at school, Kyle gives a speech calling for the end of fat shaming, which garners a positive reception. Overjoyed, Cartman proceeds to insult his classmates and everyone else in town without being mocked in return for his weight, and books a flight to Pakistan to continue this.

== Voice cast ==
- Trey Parker
- Matt Stone
- April Stewart
- Mona Marshall
- Kimberly Brooks
- Jessica Makinson
- Vernon Chatman
- Jennifer Howell
- Feraz Ozel
- Betty Boogie Parker
- Abdullah Saeed

== Development ==
On August 5, 2021, Comedy Central announced that Trey Parker and Matt Stone had signed a $900 million deal for extending the series to 30 seasons through 2027 and 14 feature films, exclusive to the Paramount+ streaming platform. Later that month, it was revealed that two films per year would be released during that time. Parker and Stone would later state that the projects would not be feature films, and that it was ViacomCBS who decided to advertise them as movies.

== Reception ==
John Schwarz of Bubbleblabber gave the episode an 8/10, calling it "one of the more movie-parody efforts" and remarked that: "Not since The Imaginationland Trilogy has Trey Parker dipped into this bag of tricks to truly go nuts by integrating fantastical elements, like a crew of pissed off breakfast cereal mascots, into the plot of the show and does so in such hysterical fashion."

Renaldo Matadeen writing for CBR felt that the episode "speaks to another real-world issue, where bodies like the FDA and other authorities warn against such secondary pharmacies."

Author Cathy O'Neil wrote that it "brilliantly satirizes the culture around weight loss, fat shaming, and weight loss drugs".

Rapper Lizzo, who is referenced in the episode, reacted in a video post on Instagram, "Guys, my worst fear has been actualized. I've been referenced in a South Park episode."
