= Japanese Toilet (South Park) =

- South Park episode
- Episode no.: Season 26; Episode 3
- Directed by: Trey Parker
- Written by: Trey Parker
- Production code: 2603
- Original air date: March 1, 2023

Episode chronology
← Previous "The Worldwide Privacy Tour"	Next → "Deep Learning"
- South Park season 26

"Japanese Toilet" is the third episode of the twenty-sixth season of the American animated television series South Park, and the 322nd episode of the series overall. Written and directed by series co-creator Trey Parker, it premiered on Comedy Central on March 1, 2023. The episode's plot centers upon Randy Marsh's purchase of a luxurious Japanese toilet, which puts him and his fourth-grader son Stan in conflict with the rest of the townsfolk and the toilet paper industry.

== Plot ==
When the toilet in the Marsh family's powder room stops working, Sharon Marsh orders her husband Randy to get a new one. While reluctant to part with "Ol' Blue", he becomes intrigued with a Japanese toilet at Home Depot. Although Sharon is upset at its $10,000 cost, she too becomes enthralled by it. Randy calls his neighbors to brag about it, resulting in his son Stan being mocked at school. Randy tells Stan their family is akin to the Kennedy family of South Park and he is simply trying to open people's eyes, but Stan insists that he is merely showing off.

Randy's proctologist, Dr. Sheltair, makes a house call to check on Randy's hemorrhoids. However, when Randy states that he no longer has them because of the level of cleanliness effected by his Japanese toilet, Sheltair is angered because the lower amount of work caused by the devices will mean that he and his wife will not be able to vacation in Tuscany. Stan's classmate Jimmy Valmer says that while that 70% of the world does not use toilet paper, Americans use it excessively, straining the resources used to produce it. Jimmy asserts that Americans do not want to change their toilets and never will. Randy delivers a speech at city hall extolling the virtues of Japanese toilets, and insists that the public no longer needs toilet paper, but he is shot by an unknown assassin, and left in a coma.

Sheltair takes people at Home Depot hostage at gunpoint, saying that he did not shoot Randy and fears he will be silenced like that student who wrote an exposé about toilets two years ago. Sheltair then shoots himself, and Stan confronts Jimmy, realizing that he was who Sheltair was talking about. Jimmy confesses after he wrote a story about toilets for the school newspaper, toilet paper corporations silenced him because they have too much to lose if Americans stop using toilet paper. Stan decides to reveal this to the public with his own press conference, but Randy, cowed by his attempted assassination, shows up to abort this, telling the public that toilet paper is a great product, and Japanese toilets are unnecessary. He apologizes to the public and removes his Japanese toilet. Restoring Ol' Blue, he resolves not to take the common, non-luxury items his family has for granted.

== Reception ==
John Schwarz with Bubbleblabber rated the episode a 9 out of 10, stating in his review "the joke here isn't the toilets per se, its [sic] instead Matt and Trey devising another shot at a multi-billion dollar a year industry, and again shining light on another topic that I'm sure isn't top-of-mind for anybody but them, but is one that makes you think mere minutes into the guys' monologues. It just goes to show that nobody, not even potential advertisers in the areas of prescription drugs, fast food, and now toiletries, are safe from the magnifying glass that is South Park Studios, and the results are anything but shitty."

Max Nocerino with The Future of the Force called the episode a "Solid A!", summarizing his review by stating "South Park has become the loudest and clearest voice in an echo chamber that is American BS. True, it isn't quite as hilarious as it was in its heyday. But I just love how they tackle all these little issues that we don't really think about or accept as the total norm (despite being hogwash). Also, I am always down for Randy hijinks. I laughed a little but my eyes are now wide open."

Cathal Gunning, in his review for Screen Rant, stated, "Jimmy's diatribe about the damage that toilet paper causes to the world's ecosystems further proved that the long-running series still has further surprises in its twenty-sixth year. Even though South Park has mocked every major religion, numerous dead celebrities, and even rival television shows, the series is very serious about the cost that Americans using toilet paper has on the environment."
