= The Worldwide Privacy Tour =

- South Park episode
- Episode no.: Season 26; Episode 2
- Directed by: Trey Parker
- Written by: Trey Parker
- Production code: 2602
- Original air date: February 15, 2023

Episode chronology
← Previous "Cupid Ye"	Next → "Japanese Toilet"
- South Park season 26

"The Worldwide Privacy Tour" (Note: The press release from Comedy Central/South Park, and the full episode video link from Comedy Central, list the title as "The Worldwide Privacy Tour". Other sources list the title as either "Worldwide Privacy Tour" or "The World-Wide Privacy Tour". The press release title is used for consistency.) is the second episode of the twenty-sixth season of the American animated television series South Park, and the 321st episode of the series overall. The episode was first announced on February 13, 2023, and premiered on February 15, 2023. A parody of Prince Harry, Duke of Sussex, and Meghan, Duchess of Sussex's decision to "step back as 'senior' members of the Royal Family" and their subsequent rebranding, the episode depicts a visit to the town of South Park by the Prince of Canada and his wife, who say they are seeking privacy and seclusion but come into conflict with fourth grader Kyle Broflovski, who himself is trying to better his life with brand management.

== Plot ==
A grief-stricken Ike Broflovski keeps watching a video of the Queen of Canada's funeral. His monopolizing of the computer prevents his older brother Kyle from playing an online video game with his friends, who level up without him. Butters Stotch recommends brand management to Kyle and takes him to CumHammer Brand Management, where an agent named Mr. Davis suggests brands that all end with the word "victim".

The Prince of Canada and his wife, who have been bashing the monarchy, go on an international book tour to promote his memoir Waaagh and to demand privacy. They move into the house across from the Broflovskis. Although they say they want privacy, their noisy activities are disruptive to Kyle. When he complains, they scream that he is violating their privacy.

Kyle tells his friends that he is a victim, but they react with indifference, and distance themselves from him when he complains about the royal couple. After Kyle's house is plastered with magazine covers featuring the Prince's wife, he tries a brand that includes "nothing bothers him". Failing to get a reaction from him, the wife accuses Kyle of victimizing her. When the Prince tries to provoke Kyle by exposing himself, Kyle ignores him.

Kyle enters school with a more positive demeanor the next day, but learns that Bebe Stevens is beating up Butters for launching a misogynistic tirade against her per what Butters says is his "strong and assertive" brand. Realizing this is the result of CumHammer's work, Kyle goes there, and finds the Prince's wife consulting with Davis on how to retaliate against him. Kyle says that trying to engineer one's own public image reduces one to a performer rather than a human being. This convinces the Prince to abandon media appearances in favor of a more normal life, realizing what is within oneself is what defines a person, and not commodifying oneself as a product. When his wife does not respond in agreement, he looks inside her and sees that she is literally empty inside. He leaves CumHammer without her.

Kyle allows Ike his repeat viewings of the Queen's funeral, deciding that he does not care if this negatively affects his standing with his friends. Kyle's friends show up at his door and invite him to play outside to relieve his stress. They go to the local basketball court, where the Prince asks if he can play. When they assent, he sets up his drum set on the edge of the court, playing music as the boys play basketball.

== Reception ==
John Schwarz, writing for Bubbleblabber.com rated the episode an 8.5 out of 10, and stated the episode reaffirmed South Park's status as "the undisputed king of adult animated comedy", noting that it got "people talking, pissing off celebrities, and making tons of money in the process while doing so" and "week over week, 'The Worldwide Privacy Tour' actually has gone up in the ratings from South Park's premiere episode of 'Cupid Ye'".

Tom Peck, writing in The Independent, opined that the episode "[ripped] the absolute piss out of them [the Duke and Duchess of Sussex]" and "is absolutely hilarious, a brutalizing satire delivered with the kind of economy and precision that has kept South Park on air for fully 25 years." Peck concluded, "The problem with South Park getting their claws into them [the Duke and Duchess] is not a small one. It makes it clear that they have turned themselves into a joke, both in their old home and their new one."

Journalists speculated that the episode was inspired by the Duchess of Sussex's remarks when interviewed by Oprah Winfrey. When asked whether the Duke and Duchess should expect a loss of privacy in exchange for royal status, Meghan replied, "I think everyone has a basic right to privacy. Basic. We're not talking about anything that anybody else wouldn't expect."

=== Response from the Duke and Duchess of Sussex ===
Shortly after the episode aired, the Duchess of Sussex was reportedly "upset and overwhelmed" and "annoyed" by the episode and refused to watch it in its entirety. A spokesperson for the couple denied rumors that she and Prince Harry planned to file a lawsuit over the episode.

== See also ==
- Monarchy of Canada § In media and popular culture
