= Deep Learning (South Park) =

- South Park episode
- Episode no.: Season 26; Episode 4
- Directed by: Trey Parker
- Written by: Trey Parker; ChatGPT
- Production code: 2604
- Original air date: March 8, 2023

Episode chronology
← Previous "Japanese Toilet"	Next → "DikinBaus Hot Dogs"
- South Park season 26

"Deep Learning" is the fourth episode of the twenty-sixth season of the American animated television series South Park, and the 323rd episode of the series overall. Written and directed by Trey Parker, it premiered on March 8, 2023. The episode, which parodies the use of the artificial intelligence chatbot ChatGPT (which is credited as a co-writer for the episode) for text messages, centers upon fourth-grader Stan Marsh, who comes to rely on the software for writing both school essays and romantic texts to his girlfriend Wendy Testaburger, bringing him into conflict with her, his classmates, and school officials.

== Plot ==
When fourth-grader Bebe Stevens extols the romantic texts written to her by Clyde Donovan, classmate Wendy Testaburger complains to her boyfriend, Stan Marsh, that his replies to her messages consist of merely a thumbs up. Clyde tells Stan about ChatGPT, an AI-based app he uses to write the texts, but cautions Stan not to tell anyone else about it. Stan relies on the app to text Wendy while engaging in other activities. Wendy is buoyed by Stan's more heartfelt texts, though he cannot truthfully answer her questions about them.

Stan and Clyde also use the app to write their school essays, as do their classmates Eric Cartman and Butters Stotch. Cartman complains that more students learning about it would cost them their advantage, and their teacher, Mr. Garrison, would learn they cheated. Meanwhile, Garrison laments to his partner, Rick, that he now has to work harder to grade and comment on his students' essays. Rick tells him about ChatGPT, but instead of realizing that his students used it for essays, Garrison realizes he can use it to grade them. He thanks Rick for his supportive replies to his texts.

School counselor Mr. Mackey informs Stan's class that a student used OpenAI technology for schoolwork. A technician dressed as a falconer arrives with his falcon Shadowbane to analyze the students' work and identify the cheater. Stan and Garrison confess to each other that they used ChatGPT. They rationalize that it is merely akin to having a good writer's assistant, but when Garrison learns this can be used for texting, he is angered to realize that Rick used it to text him. The technician reveals Shadowbane detected chatbot writing in Wendy's cell phone, though she denies using the app. Worrying he cannot think of a way out of this, Stan instructs ChatGPT to write a story that is resolved when he convinces everyone that it is okay that he lied about using the app, and that tech companies who monetize OpenAI should not determine the ethical limits of AI. The events of Stan's prompt play out, with Wendy being arrested before Stan makes a speech with intentionally stilted dialogue (complete with Cartman calling Stan a "dumb jew" rather than Kyle), convincing the officers to release Wendy and the technician to vow to stop tech companies using OpenAI. Stan decides that sometimes a thumbs up from a human is better than machine-generated lies, but when Clyde asks Stan how he pulled this off, Stan simply explains, "ChatGPT, dude."

In the closing credits, the writers of the episode are credited as both Trey Parker and ChatGPT.

== Reception ==
Bubbleblabber contributor John Schwarz rated the episode a 7.5 out of 10, stating in his review, "One day we're going to look back on this episode like we do when we think of the many chimps that we've sent to outer space when testing space flight capabilities and marvel at how far we've come in web3 show business production. Trey Parker's genius is still quite evident in this week's episode, in just a few seasons, we may not even need that."

Max Nocerino with The Future of the Force gave the episode a B+ rating, conceding that while the episode was "brilliant", the show was not as "hysterically funny as it used to be", and cited this episode as example of that trend. Nocerino stated, "It just doesn't split my sides anymore. Perhaps like all things, nothing lasts forever. Yet, I will continue to watch and give this episode props for understanding the double-edged sword that is ChatGPT. One of South Park's strengths is that it has its finger on the pulse of current events. And knows how to rip them to shreds."

Cathal Gunning, reviewing the episode for Screen Rant, wrote that in keeping with South Park's proclivity for self-satire, the ending was "intentionally far too tidy and the scene ended the story way too slickly", but nonetheless effective and clever. In particular, Gunning stated, "When Stan used ChatGPT to end the episode's story, the resulting scene sounded very familiar since the sequence that was supposedly written by AI sounded like a lazy episode of South Park. From Cartman's insults to Stan's impassioned ending speech to Mr. Mackey's long-forgotten catchphrase, the final scenes of 'Deep Learning' leaned into tropes that South Park has used ad nauseam."
