= Spring Break (South Park) =

- South Park episode
- Episode no.: Season 26; Episode 6
- Directed by: Trey Parker
- Written by: Trey Parker
- Production code: 2606
- Original air date: March 29, 2023

Episode chronology
← Previous "DikinBaus Hot Dogs"	Next → "South Park: Joining the Panderverse"
- South Park season 26

"Spring Break" is the sixth and final episode of the twenty-sixth season of the American animated television series South Park, and the 325th episode of the series overall. It premiered on Comedy Central on March 29, 2023. The episode's plot centers upon fourth grade teacher Mr. Garrison, who "falls into old habits" as he returns to his previous persona of President of the United States. Meanwhile, Randy Marsh holds a raucous party at Tegridy Farms in an attempt to imprint ideas about masculinity upon his son, Stan, and in doing so, recruits Alonzo Fineski, a sex trafficker modeled on Andrew Tate.

== Plot ==
Fourth grade teacher Mr. Garrison books a trip to Myrtle Beach, South Carolina with his boyfriend Rick for spring break, but Rick is worried that Garrison may encounter temptations from his past. Garrison insists he merely wants to enjoy the vacation together.

With his wife Sharon and daughter Shelly on vacation in Santa Fe, Randy Marsh anticipates spending the week with his son, Stan, who invites his neighbor Tolkien Black over to play Warhammer 40K. Randy deems the game a waste of time, saying that spring break is better spent with wet T-shirt contests and female mud wrestling. He laments that liberal society has pathologized masculinity as toxic. He throws a raucous party with the help of a manager of strippers, not knowing that he is a wanted sex trafficker named Alonzo Fineski. This results in multiple injuries to Randy, and a police shootout that brings the party to a halt.

In Myrtle Beach, Garrison and Rick pass by a Make America Great Again (MAGA) store, spurring feelings of nostalgia for his prior stint as President of the United States. Remembering his promise to Rick, Garrison declines an invitation to rally inside the store, but sneaks out of bed that night to do so. As he continues to resume his president persona, this drives away Rick.

Giving a speech at a 2024 election rally, Garrison addresses Rick, who watches on a television. Garrison says that some people cannot be alone, because they need someone to be accountable to, and that Rick is the one who kept him from destroying himself. A dejected Randy hears this too, and calls Sharon to beg her to return home. As Garrison tells the crowd, "I love Rick", the crowd repeats these words as a chant. This morphs into an angry mob that storms the Capitol building in Washington, D.C., which is depicted with footage of the January 6, 2021 Capitol attack.

Sharon and Shelly return home. Randy apologizes for cutting their trip short, but a reassuring Sharon tells him that he lasted longer than last year. Rick welcomes Garrison back with open arms. When Garrison tells him that he does not want to repeat his stint as president, but merely to remain in South Park with him, Rick says that they will wait and see what happens, before the couple retreats inside.

== Reception ==
John Schwarz of Bubbleblabber gave the episode an 8/10, calling it a "topsy-turvy finale" and remarking that Parker and Stone "consistently showcase a meta-level ability to give us entertaining thought-provoking television". Meanwhile, Cathal Gunning of Screen Rant was critical of the character of Alonzo Fineski, saying that attempt to parody Andrew Tate "made no sense" given that the portrayal was "surprisingly flattering", and that Randy was made the mouthpiece for Tate's expressed beliefs. Tate himself responded to the character's inclusion on Twitter, stating, "When I will be proven innocent, I look forward to help create the greatest South Park episode of all time."
