= South Park (Not Suitable for Children) =

2023 American television special

- South Park episode
- Promotional poster
- Directed by: Trey Parker
- Written by: Trey Parker
- Original air date: December 20, 2023
- Running time: 47 minutes

Episode chronology
← Previous "South Park: Joining the Panderverse"	Next → "South Park: The End of Obesity"

"South Park (Not Suitable for Children)" is a 2023 American adult animated comedy television special episode. It is the sixth South Park television special, and the 327th episode of the series overall. The special premiered on December 20, 2023 on Paramount+.

The episode parodies the internet subscription service OnlyFans and social media influencers, including Logan Paul and his beverage brand, Prime.

== Plot ==
Parents and school administrators at South Park Elementary have become concerned at how a hydration drink called Cred has been popularized by social media influencers to the point that students carry it as a status symbol. This has led fourth grader Clyde Donovan to falsely portray himself as a regular drinker of Cred. His father Roger and stepmother Janice forbid him from drinking it due to the artificial sweeteners it contains, but Clyde rebuffs Janice, whom he says is not really his mother. Clyde's classmates, Eric Cartman, Tweek Tweek, and Butters Stotch, invite Clyde into their exclusive affinity group for Cred drinkers. To perpetuate his false image as a Cred drinker, he purchases a black market empty Cred bottle from Nathan, and fills it with apple juice, but this is discovered, and the entire group is shunned. To rehabilitate their image, they travel to an event in Pueblo, Colorado, to purchase a limited edition Super Cred, but a mob of children there degenerates into a riot. The group realizes they have been manipulated by influencers, and resolve to find Clyde's favorite influencer, Logan LeDouche.

Meanwhile, Randy Marsh begins making bottomless OnlyFans videos, but Sharon, who disapproves, counters by creating an OnlyFans account of her own, which is far more successful. To increase his subscriber count, he begins using Cred in his videos as a trending topic. Sharon becomes concerned that the views come from minors, but Randy refuses to stop. After an influence agent explains to him how sponsors bid against each other to have top social influencers promote their products, Randy participates in an auction where influence is auctioned off to the highest bidder. There, he is arrested by the FBI, whose agents show him pornographic images of "miners", prompting him to cooperate. Clyde and his friends confront Logan, who explains that he merely works for a higher power to influence people, but before he can reveal his sponsor, he is assassinated by a sniper.

The FBI shoots the assassin off a rooftop, who is revealed to be the auctioneer, functioning as a middleman. Returning home, the children see Randy throwing away his entire supply of Cred. He is doing this, he explains, because the social media industry is not suitable for children, who need to know that they are always being targeted, and need to know who wants to influence them the most. Clyde returns home and confronts Janice for being the unseen influencer in his life. She admits that she used Cred, despite being against its consumption by children, because it helped attract Clyde's views, so that they talk more and bond. When Clyde asks her if he can call her "mom", she agrees, but he then says, "Fuck you, mom!" before storming off. Despite this, Janice's heart is warmed by him addressing her as his mother.

At school the next day, the affinity group shows off a highly-sought-after Cred flavor salvaged from Randy, a bottle of which Cartman gives to Clyde. He drinks it and says it tastes amazing, prompting the rest of the schoolchildren to rejoice.

== Voice cast ==
- Trey Parker
- Matt Stone
- April Stewart
- Kimberly Brooks
- Jessica Makinson
- Chris Borkovec
- Betty Boogie Parker
- Cleopatra Stone
- Jacob Grahame-Smith
- Lucas Alvarado
- Clara Del Tredici
- Manuelle Del Tredici
- Nina Fikre
- Demien Garner
- Kayla Holmes
- Grace Petty
- Jai Young
- Janai Young

== Development ==
On August 5, 2021, Comedy Central announced that Trey Parker and Matt Stone had signed a $900 million deal for extending the series to 30 seasons through 2027 and 14 feature films, exclusive to the Paramount+ streaming platform. Later that month, it was revealed that two films per year would be released during that time. Parker and Stone would later state that the projects would not be feature films, and that it was ViacomCBS who decided to advertise them as movies.

== Reception ==
Drunken Yoda with Last Movie Outpost rated the episode 3½ out of 5 stars, commenting how he enjoyed the jabs at influencer culture but felt the show missed its mark, and stated in his review, "I appreciate at least they are identifying problems no one else in the legacy media will even come close to touching with a 10-foot pole, but they continue to miss the targets, or at the very least, pull back when they should be doing the Mortal Kombat 'FINISH HIM!' move. I guess I’ll take what I can get."

John Schwarz with Bubbleblabber rated the episode a 9.5 out of 10, stating that while he questioned the overall influence of media, "I could hear an argument on how non-fictitious programming and advertiser-influenced magazines can help nudge the minds of those of whom are uneducated and immature in understanding of basic principles of comprehension." He summarized his review stating, "If you’re looking for an early Christmas treat from the best adult animated sitcom property of all-time, well this is the way to go."

Writing for Screen Rant, Cathal Gunning noted that the main characters of South Park had seemingly changed from the four main boys (Kyle, Stan, Kenny and Eric) to Randy Marsh, but that this episode hurt Randy's character. Gunning stated in his review, "While focusing on Clyde's plight in 'Not Suitable for Children' worked well, this left the special's subplot feeling like it belonged in a different show altogether. The tale about Stan's father setting up an OnlyFans account didn't really gel with the primary narrative since Stan was barely featured in the special, so Randy's subplot was barely related to the main story. Unfortunately, this isn't the first time South Park struggled with this exact issue in its feature-length specials."

Logan Paul reacted positively on Twitter to the parody of him and Prime beverages by recreating a live rendition of the commercial for Cred shown during the episode and commenting "Thanks for the CRED @SouthPark".
