= South Park: Joining the Panderverse =

2023 American television special

- South Park episode
- Promotional poster
- Directed by: Trey Parker
- Written by: Trey Parker
- Original air date: October 27, 2023
- Running time: 49 minutes

Episode chronology
← Previous "Spring Break"	Next → "South Park (Not Suitable for Children)"

"South Park: Joining the Panderverse" is a 2023 American adult animated comedy television special episode. It is the fifth South Park television special, and the 326th episode of the series overall. The special premiered on October 27, 2023 on Paramount+.

The episode parodies The Walt Disney Company, CEO Robert "Bob" Iger and Lucasfilm President Kathleen Kennedy in particular, and the perceived practice of producing formulaic films exhibiting "forced wokeness", for reasons of identity politics. The story depicts fourth-grader Eric Cartman as he is transported to another universe in which all of South Park's residents are racially diverse women opposed to the patriarchy, while a version of Kennedy that resembles Cartman is depicted frequently tampering with Disney's productions by demanding inclusion of minority groups.

== Plot ==
Fourth-grader Eric Cartman is transported to an alternate universe, designated Universe 216-B, which is populated entirely by racially diverse adult women, while his counterpart from that universe takes his place in his own universe. Meanwhile, Randy Marsh cannot find a repairman to fix his oven door. He and his neighbors learn that every handyman in town has become extremely wealthy, as the inability of people to make simple repairs has increased demand for their services, making it impossible to find such professionals. Meanwhile, Bob Iger and his board at the Walt Disney Company realize that something is "different" about board member Kathleen Kennedy (who resembles Cartman), whose practice of shoehorning racially diverse women into the company's productions has resulted in repeated failure at the box office.

In Universe 216-B the real Kathleen Kennedy finds Cartman, and tells her that she was replaced by the other Kennedy after she began using an ancient piece of artificial intelligence called the Panderstone, which can repeatedly create the same rehashed film that appeals to everyone. When Disney began receiving hate mail as a result of these films, the real Kennedy began overutilizing the Panderstone as a crutch to fight bigotry, but this destabilized the device, and opened a portal that transported Kennedy to Universe 216-B, and the other Kennedy to their universe. When Cartman learns that she is the reason why "Disney movies all suck now," and she learns Cartman was behind all of the hate mail, they each initially blame each other for the current crisis. However, they eventually realize they each created each other, and mutually apologize.

Iger and his advisers deduce the two Kennedys have been switched, and go to South Park, where they team up with Randy and his neighbors to resolve the issue. At Randy's home, they recreate the portal in Randy's broken oven with the Panderstone, sending Cartman's adult black female counterpart back to her universe and returning Cartman and his Kennedy home, where she tells her Disney colleagues that they will only make original content that does not pander. Randy also brings to his universe dozens of handymen to do the town's repair jobs. The Cartman-like Kathleen Kennedy is also returned to her own universe.

== Voice cast ==
- Trey Parker
- Matt Stone
- April Stewart
- Mona Marshall
- Adrien Beard
- Kimberly Brooks
- Janeshia Adams-Ginyard
- Mo Ashley
- Alice Ghostlie
- Diana Lauren Jones
- Montana Jacobowitz
- Luis Perez

== Development ==
On August 5, 2021, Comedy Central announced that Trey Parker and Matt Stone had signed a $900 million deal for extending the series to 30 seasons through 2027 and 14 feature films, exclusive to the Paramount+ streaming platform. Later that month, it was revealed that two films per year would be released during that time. Parker and Stone would later state that the projects would not be feature films, and that it was ViacomCBS who decided to advertise them as movies.

== Reaction ==
=== Critical reception ===
Den of Geek's Rendy Jones wrote that the episode succeeded in its admonishment of "right-wing, anti-woke social media accounts," but held reservations about its "messaging", of which he asserted that it "could be more 'nuanced' than the 'both sides suck' area."

Ryan Smith, reviewing the episode for CBR, felt that in parodying both Disney's attempts to exhibit diversity "for wider appeal," and the negative reaction by those opposed to such initiatives, the episode "ironically pandered" to those who take a strong stance on the subject. Nonetheless, Smith thought that the program succeeded in this approach, astutely diagnosing how such productions are the result of poor decision-making, while also doing a good job of using Cartman to roast the most noxious critics of these initiatives among fandom, which Smith found "hilarious."

Keegan Kelly with Cracked.com both praised and criticized the episode, saying that while much of it was "punchy, hilarious and incisive," the series' satirical outlook on cultural debates remained hampered by consistently summarizing them as "Douche vs. Turd."

=== Industry reaction ===
The episode parodies The Walt Disney Company, Lucasfilm President Kathleen Kennedy, and the company's perceived practice of producing formulaic films, for reasons of "forced wokeness." Actress Gina Carano, who had been fired from the Lucasfilm TV series The Mandalorian in 2021 for comments that were interpreted as a comparison of treatment of American conservatives to Jews in Nazi Germany, called the episode "hilarious," and predicted that Kennedy would retaliate, writing on Twitter that Kennedy would "[demand] any [YouTuber] get censored off of YouTube for sharing" the episode and that Kennedy would "have her publicist ghouls make sure Variety and Hollywood Reporter run hit pieces about the South Park creators and their families."

Ray Flook, writing for Bleeding Cool, believed that the episode was lampooning people on both sides of the "woke capitalism" divide, but had problems with the episode's treatment of Kennedy, and with Carano's take on it. He felt that the episode placed too much blame on Kennedy for the then-current decline of box office figures, ratings, and critical reaction to its productions, to the exclusion of various other recent company decisions by certain executives, and that the focus on her came across as personal. He added that the episode gave an incentive for others to cherry-pick parts of it in order to lay the blame on Kennedy, which included Carano.

Josh Wilding, writing for SFFGazette.com, believed the episode was parodying individuals on both sides of the debate, and said of Carano's public statements, "Ironically, she misses the point that this episode was, as well as poking fun at Kennedy, skewering people like her." Ryan Smith, writing for CBR.com, felt that Carano "missed the point of the episode entirely," which was to lampoon both decision-making by executives like Kennedy, as well as her critics.
