= Cupid Ye =

- South Park episode
- Episode no.: Season 26; Episode 1
- Directed by: Matt Stone
- Written by: Matt Stone
- Production code: 2601
- Original air date: February 8, 2023

Episode chronology
| ← Previous "South Park: The Streaming Wars Part 2" | Next → "The Worldwide Privacy Tour" |
- South Park season 26

"Cupid Ye" is the twenty-sixth season premiere of the American animated television series South Park, and the 320th episode of the series overall. Written and directed by Matt Stone, it premiered on Comedy Central in the United States on February 8, 2023. The episode depicts a scheme hatched by Eric Cartman after Stan Marsh comes to feel threatened by the friendship developing between classmates Kyle Broflovski and Tolkien Black, in a parody of the antisemitic views of rapper Kanye West, and Jewish stereotypes in general, including the antisemitic trope that Jews control Hollywood.

== Plot ==
Fourth graders Stan Marsh and Eric Cartman observe that Stan's best friend, Kyle Broflovski, has been spending more time with their classmate Tolkien Black, making daily TikTok videos and playing together more often. Seeing Stan dispirited by this, Cartman decides to "be a good Christian" and do something about it. He begins promulgating the antisemitic trope to Tolkien and others that Jews control the media, and that Kyle himself runs Hollywood. Cartman is assisted by Cupid Ye, a modified version of Cupid Me, an imaginary Cupid-like version of himself first seen in the episode "Cartman Finds Love". In addition to his altered name, Cupid Ye has adopted hip hop fashion and antisemitic beliefs.

Cartman is threatened with two months' detention by PC Principal if he does not cease promoting his smears about Jewish people. Cartman nonetheless continues do so in media interviews, though he is troubled by some of the more shocking comments uttered by Cupid Ye that Cartman thinks go too far. These ideas continue to spread among the student body, much to Kyle's anger, which drives a wedge between him and Tolkien. When Cupid Ye steals a car for a joyride, the horrified Cartman confesses his actions to Stan. Stan apologizes to Tolkien, feeling that his jealousy over Kyle and Tolkien's friendship helped set these events in motion. Cupid Ye accelerates the spread of the hatred by using his arrows to poison the minds of the student body, resulting in Kyle being threatened by a mob of students. As Stan and Tolkien stand in his defense, Cartman confronts Cupid Ye and forces him to take his medication, returning him to his normal Cupid Me state, at which point he resumes his normal task of spreading love among the student body.

At a public speaking engagement, Kyle addresses a large group of people in an attempt to educate the public on the history of Jewish involvement in the entertainment industry, and how that industry is actually controlled by tens of thousands of people all over the world. His speech moves the attendees, some of whom suggest that Kyle himself should run Hollywood, an idea that the crowd cheers, much to Kyle's frustration.

The closing credits, which normally mention both Trey Parker and Matt Stone, instead read "Created by Matt Stone", "Executive Producer Matt Stone", "Written and Directed by Matt Stone", and "Assistant to Mr. Stone Trey Parker".

== Reception ==
John Schwarz with Bubbleblabber.com rated the episode a 10 out of 10 and commented, "The set up and execution of this week's episode is pretty flawless all across the board and everybody was put on notice. Clearly, the producers are not done with the PC crowd and even a slight continuation of the 'Streaming Wars' seems to be evident so it will be interesting to see how that plays in the next few weeks."

Kayleigh Donaldson with Consequence commented in her review, "the show has mined hundreds of hours out of the depressingly undying nature of bigotry in its purest and sneakiest forms. Some of the kids may not see the big deal in thinking that a pre-teen Colorado kid runs Hollywood...but when Cupid Ye starts talking about 'they' who rule everything, you know how far such conspiracies can spread and the damage they do. The most seemingly ludicrous claims can quickly grow legs and mutate into something unstoppable."
