= Mona Marshall =

American voice actress

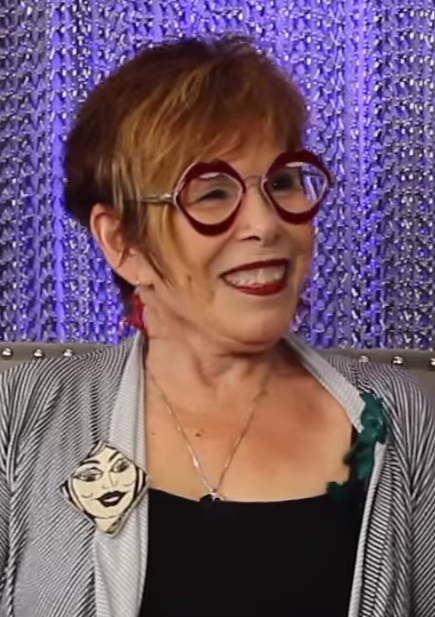
- Marshall in 2019
- Other names: Sally Evans; Destiny; Michelle Moran; Mikie Morgan; Miki Moran
- Occupation: Voice actress
- Years active: 1972–present
- Agent(s): Arlene Thornton and Associates
- Spouse: Sal Iannotti (m. 1986; died 2023)

Mona Marshall is an American voice actress, known for her work in a number of cartoons, anime shows, films and video games. Her major credits include South Park, where she voices many of the female characters on the show, .hack//Sign, Fraggle Rock: The Animated Series, CBS Storybreak, and Digimon. She has also appeared on-stage for television shows such as Cheers and Who's the Boss?

== Career ==
Marshall has a theatre background and trained for the stage. When she was teaching fifth grade, the mother of one of her students suggested she enroll in a voice-over class taught by the late Daws Butler, voice of Yogi Bear and Quick Draw McGraw.

She is often cast in the roles of young male characters. Her roles have included parts not only in American animated television series and several animated feature films, but also in Japanese anime.

Her most notable roles in American cartoons are Sheila Broflovski (1999–present), after original voice actress Mary Kay Bergman died by suicide, and Linda Stotch on the popular television show South Park as well as the title character in Doraemon and Kite, the main protagonist of the 2002 video game series .hack for PlayStation 2. Marshall voiced the talking bear Koby the Study Buddy and she also provided the English voice for the title character in the El Chavo: The Animated Series.

Outside of voice acting, Marshall has coached others on the craft, and has worked on a singing career with solo songs she would perform on stage.

== Filmography ==
=== Anime ===
List of dubbing performances in anime
Year	Title	Role	Notes	Source
1997	Gatchaman	Jimmy	Harmony Gold dub	CA
1998	Bastard!!	Young Gara	OVA	CA
1999	Jungle De Ikou!	Ongo	OVA	CA
1999-2001	Digimon Adventure series	Izzy Izumi		
2000	Apocalypse Zero	Harara Hagakure	Bang Zoom! dub	CA
2002	X	Nataku		
2003	Wolf's Rain	Toboe		
2003	Chobits	Minoru Kokubunji		
2005–09	Naruto series	Inari, Haku (young)		
2007–11	Rozen Maiden series	Jun Sakurada		
2000-2002	Love Hina	Motoko Aoyama		
	Saint Tail	Kyoko		
2005	Tenchi Muyo! Ryo-Ohki OVA 3	Ryoko, Rea Masaki		
2010–present	Blue Exorcist series	Konekomaru Miwa		
	Rave Master	Plue		
2014–15	Doraemon	Doraemon	Bang Zoom! dub	
2018	Ai Tenchi Muyo!	Hachiko		
2020	Ghost in the Shell: SAC_2045	Gary's Wife, Kaede		
2024	Uzumaki	Shuichi's mother		
2026	Akane-banashi	Saki Yoshino		

- Ah My Buddha – Sakura
- Arc the Lad – Monkey, Poco
- Armitage: Dual-Matrix – Julian Moore
- Apocalypse Zero – Harara Hagakure
- Bakuto Sengen Daigunder – Makoto
- Battle Athletes Victory
- Battle B-Daman – Bull
- B-Daman Crossfire – Riki Ryugasaki
- The Big O – Winter Night Phantom
- Black Jack – Nomad, Michelle (Young)
- Bleach – Ichigo Kurosaki (Child), Mika
- Blue Exorcist – Konekomaru Miwa
- Bobobo-bo Bo-bobo – Young Bo-bobo, Lambada, LOVE
- Carried by the Wind: Tsukikage Ran – Ran Tsukikage
- Cowboy Bebop – Wen
- Digimon Adventure – Koushiro "Izzy" Izumi
- Digimon Adventure 02 – Koushiro "Izzy" Izumi
- Digimon Tamers – Terriermon/Gargomon/Rapidmon/MegaGargomon (Shared with Dave Wittenberg)/Gummymon
- Digimon Frontier – Lucemon
- Digimon Data Squad – Frigimon, Young Thomas, King Drasil 2-9000-WZ
- Eagle Riders – Mickey Dougan
- Eiken – Grace Lin
- El Hazard: The Magnificent World – Nahato
- FAKE – Bikky, Maria, Cindy Irving
- Fate/stay night: Unlimited Blade Works – Shirou Emiya (Young)
- Fate/Zero – Shirou Emiya
- Fighting Spirit- Chana
- Flint the Time Detective – Getalong, Snapper of the Cardians
- Fushigi Yūgi – Boushin, Mrs. Yuki
- Gate Keepers – Young Shun
- Ghost in the Shell: S.A.C. 2nd GIG – Street Kid (RED DATA)
- Ghost in the Shell: S.A.C. 2nd GIG – Chai
- Ghost Slayers Ayashi – Kyosai Kawanabe
- Hand Maid May – Masato Zin
- Idaten Jump – Ayumu Yamato
- Kanokon – Kouta Oyamada
- Kashimashi: Girl Meets Girl – Tomari Kurusu
- Kekkaishi – Yumeko "Mother-san" Hananokoji
- Kuromajo-san ga Toru!! – Chiyoko Kurotori
- Kyo Kara Maoh! – Wolfram von Bielefeld
- Last Exile – Lucciola
- Lupin III – Baranco
- Macross Plus – Various characters
- MÄR – Emokis
- Magic Knight Rayearth – Ascot
- Mahoromatic – Feldlance, Young Suguru Misato
- Tranzor Z – Toad
- Mobile Suit Gundam 0080: War in the Pocket – Chay, Telcott
- Moribito: Guardian of the Spirit – Chagum
- Naruto – Inari, Young Haku, Ryugan
- Naruto: Shippuden – Biwako Sarutobi
- New Getter Robo – Raikou Minamoto
- Nightwalker: The Midnight Detective – Kasumi (Young), Yoko
- Noein – Asuka Kaminogi
- Nodame Cantabile – Chiyo Sakata, Makiko Tanaka, Shizuka, Shinichi Chiaki (Young)
- Omishi Magical Theater: Risky Safety – Yuya Fukami
- Otogi Zoshi (TV series) – Kintaro
- Rurouni Kenshin – Okita Sōji, Oguni Suzume
- Saber Marionette J Again – Otaru Mamiya
- Saiyuki Reload – Ginkaku
- Samurai X – Tsukayama Yutarō (the Sony Dub version of Rurouni Kenshin)
- Scrapped Princess – Sutton
- S-CRY-ed – Akira Terada
- Someday's Dreamers – Gossiping Mage, Haru, Junko, Mother, Ms. Kuniko, Office Clerk, Orphanage Headmaster, Yasuyuki
- Tenchi Muyo! GXP – Ryoko, Ryo-Ohki, Noike Kamiki Jurai, Suiren
- Trigun – Kaite Trevisick
- Vampire Knight: Guilty – Young Kaname (Ep. 3)
- Vampire Princess Miyu – Matsukaze
- Vandread – Meia's Fama, Chisato's Mother, Fat Lady,
- Wild Arms: Twilight Venom – Mirabelle's Mother
- Zatch Bell! – Yuuta, Hirofume
- Zenki – Mrs. Kazue

=== Animation ===
List of voice performances in animation
Year	Title	Role	Notes	Source
1987	CBS Storybreak	Various		
1987	Fraggle Rock: The Animated Series	Mokey Fraggle, Cotterpin Doozer, Additional Voices		
1999–present	South Park	Sheila Broflovski, others		
2005	All Grown Up!	Middle Kid, Elves	Ep. The Finster Who Stole Christmas	
2019	Amphibia	Sylvia Sundew	Hop Pop and Lock and Family Fishing Trip	

- Chuck Norris: Karate Kommandos – Too-Much
- Chucklewood Critters – Rusty, Bearbette, Bluebell
- Dumbo's Circus – Matilda Dinkum
- El Chavo Animado – Chavo, Miss Pinster
- G.I. Joe: A Real American Hero – Vena, Cadet Demming, Mrs. Fairmont, Sally Fairmont, Fairmont Boy, Hawaiian Girl
- Inspector Gadget (Pilot episode) – Penny
- Jackie Chan Adventures – Po Kong, Bai Tsa, Vanessa Barone, Jade's mother
- James Bond Jr. – Tracy Milbanks, Tiara Hotstones
- Jem and the Holograms – D'Nisha Cross
- K10C: Kids' Ten Commandments – Miriam, Ephraim, Hannah
- Loopdidoo – Female characters
- My Little Pony – Scuttle Bug
- Rainbow Brite – Red Butler, Patty O'Green, Canary Yellow
- Rambo and the Forces of Freedom – Kat
- Rocket Power – Skinny Kid
- Rugrats – Additional Voices
- Saban's Adventures of Oliver Twist – Oliver Twist
- Spider-Man (1981) – Betty Brant
- Spiral Zone – Katerina Anastasia, Duchess Dire
- Squirrel Boy – Esther Flatbottom
- The Canterville Ghost – Ted Otis
- The Little Mermaid TV series – Aquata
- The Mummy: The Animated Series – Emperor Jin Wu
- The New Adventures of Mighty Mouse – Cow Announcer
- The Smurfs – Weepy Smurf
- The Transformers – Luisa (Fire on The Mountain), Aron (Child's Play), Hassan (Aerial Assault)
- TOME: The Terrain of Magical Expertise – Bishipp
- Wee Sing – "Animal/Classic for Kids" Songs – Singaling
- Zentrix – TZ/Little Rock

=== Films ===
List of voice performances in direct-to-video and television films
Year	Title	Role	Notes	Source
2003	Kids' Ten Commandments series	Ephraim, Hannah, Miriam		
2003	The Wacky Adventures of Ronald McDonald: The Monster O'McDonaldland Loch	Kids		
2003	Cardcaptor Sakura Movie 2: The Sealed Card	Shaoran Li		
2004	The Nutcracker and the Mouse King	Walla		
2005	Digimon: Revenge of Diaboromon	Izzy		
2005	Digimon: Battle of Adventurers	Terriermon, Gargomon, Rapidmon		
2005	Here Comes Peter Cottontail: The Movie	Little Girl, Mother Mouse		
2005	Digimon: Runaway Locomon	Terriermon		
2005	The Avenging Apes of Africa	Zambia		
2006	Arthur's Missing Pal	Rosie		
2016–2018	Digimon Adventure tri.	Koushiro "Izzy" Izumi		
2020	Digimon Adventure: Last Evolution Kizuna	Koushiro "Izzy" Izumi		
2021	South Park: Post Covid	Yentl Cartman, Additional Voices		
2021	South Park: Post Covid: The Return of Covid	Yentl Cartman		
2023	South Park: Joining the Panderverse	Sheila Broflovski		
2024	South Park: The End of Obesity	Sheila Broflovski, Linda Stotch, Helen Tweek, Additional Voices		
2024	Digimon Adventure	Izzy Izumi		
2024	Digimon Adventure: Our War Game!	Izzy Izumi		
2024	Digimon Adventure 02: Digimon Hurricane Touchdown!! / Transcendent Evolution! The Golden Digimentals	Terriermon, Gummymon, Izzy Izumi		

List of voice performances in feature films
Year	Title	Role	Notes	Source
1985	Starchaser: The Legend of Orin	Featured Voices		
1990	Asterix and the Big Fight	Mrs. Geriatrix	American dub	
1993	The Princess and the Cobbler	Nurse and Witch		
2000	Digimon: The Movie	Izzy, Terriermon		
2005	Son of the Mask	Baby Alvey voice-overs		
2008	Fly Me to the Moon	Maggot #2		
2009	Ponyo	Fujin		
2014	The Prophet	Bride's Mother, Female Guest 2, Female Villager 2	Film festival release	
2014	Stand by Me Doraemon	Doraemon	Film festival release	
2020	Stand by Me Doraemon 2	Doraemon	Streaming release	

- The Adventures of Scamper the Penguin – Narrator, Gracie (Scamper's Mom), Cowboy, Louie, Various Children Penguins
- Adventures in Voice Acting – Herself
- Arthur's Missing Pal – Rosie the Truck Driver
- Blue Exorcist: The Movie – Konekomaru Miwa
- Cardcaptor Sakura Movie 2: The Sealed Card – Syaoran Li
- Cats Don't Dance – Additional Voices
- Chicken Little – Female Poodle #2/Additional Voices
- Cloudy with a Chance of Meatballs – Woman #3/Additional Voices
- Dawn of the Dead – ADR group (Zombie #8)
- Despicable Me 2 – Additional Voices
- Despicable Me 3 – Additional Voices
- The Dragon That Wasn't (Or Was He?) – Kit Cat, Miss Fluff, Mrs. Tusker
- Frozen – Additional Voices
- Gorgeous – Bu (English dub)
- Here Comes Peter Cottontail: The Movie – Mother Mouse
- Here Come the Littles – Mrs. Evans
- Horton Hears a Who! – Additional Voices
- Hotel Transylvania 2 – Additional Voices
- Hotel Transylvania 3 – Additional Voices
- Inside Out – Additional Voices (Jill Andersen's Disgust and a Mind Worker)
- Inside Out 2 – Jill Andersen's Anxiety
- Justin and the Knights of Valour – Various Townspeople
- Little Alvin and the Mini-Munks – Lalu's Toilet
- Minions – Woman #1
- Mobile Suit Gundam F91 – Nye Fletchen
- Mondo Holocausto! – Mother Superior
- Monsters, Inc. – Leaderboard Voice/Additional Voices
- Monsters University – Emmet/Additional Voices
- Ninku – Fusuke
- Only Yesterday – Taeko's Grandmother
- Onmyoji – Suke Hime
- Rainbow Brite and the Star Stealer – Canary Yellow, Castle Creature, Patty O'Green, Red Butler, Spectran, Witch
- Sakura Wars: The Movie – Leni Milchstrasse
- Spirited Away – Additional Voices
- Street Fighter Alpha: The Movie – Shun
- Tangled – Additional Voices
- The Cat Returns – Additional Voices
- The Emoji Movie – Additional Voices
- The Hunchback of Notre Dame - Female Villager
- The Lorax – Additional Voices
- The Nutcracker and the Mouseking – One of the Mouse Guards
- The Princess and the Frog – Additional Voices
- The Secret Life of Pets – Additional Voices
- The Star – Additional Voices
- The Snow Queen – John
- The Toy Warrior – Jinoo
- The Wild – Various Female Dung Beetles
- Thumbelina: A Magical Story – Noble, Mrs. Garrison (Maya's Mom), Angela (the Good Witch), Cassandra (the Bad Witch), Pixie, The Frog Witch, Bridesmaid #1, Bridesmaid #3
- Treasure Planet – Birdbrain Mary
- Wreck-It Ralph – Additional Voices
- Young Pocahontas – Pocahontas

=== Video games ===
List of voice performances in video games
Year	Title	Role	Notes	Source
1998	Brave Fencer Musashi	Musashi		
2001	Phase Paradox	Patty Plant		
2002	Digimon Rumble Arena	Terriermon, Megagargomon		
2002	Rocket Power: Beach Bandits	Eric Golem Jr.		
2003–04	.hack games	Kite	Infection, Mutation, Outbreak, Quarantine	
2004	Ratchet & Clank: Up Your Arsenal	Helga, Helen		
2005	Rave Master	Plue		
2006–07	.hack//G.U. series	Azure Kite	3 games	
2007	Blue Dragon	Shu		
2007	Eternal Sonata	Beat, Ludwika Jedrzeiewiczowa		
2019	Moons of Madness	Cynthia, Witch, Inna, Josie, PA		
2021	Terrain of Magical Expertise	Webmaster		

- 24: The Game – Additional Voices
- Avatar: The Game – Na'vi, Rai Uk's Mother
- Brave Fencer Musashi – Musashi
- Conflict: Global Terror – Carrie Sherman and female reporter
- Guild Wars Factions – Countess Danika Zu Heltzer
- Lightning Returns: Final Fantasy XIII – Additional Voices
- Master of Monsters: Disciples of Gaia – "Master" – (uncredited)
- Ratchet & Clank – Helga, Ed(wina), Helpdesk Girl
  - Ratchet & Clank: Going Commando – Help Matron
  - Ratchet & Clank: Up Your Arsenal – Helga
  - Ratchet: Deadlocked – Eugene, Lucy
- Rocket Power: Beach Bandits – Eric Golem Jr.
- South Park Let's Go Tower Defense Play – Red McArthur
- South Park: Tenorman's Revenge – Foxy the Fox
- South Park: The Stick of Truth – Sheila Broflovski, Linda Stotch, Red McArthur, Additional Voices
- South Park: Phone Destroyer – Sheila Broflovski, Red McArthur, Additional Voices
- South Park: The Fractured but Whole – Sheila Broflovski, Linda Stotch, Red McArthur, Additional Voices
- Spectrobes: Origins
- The Granstream Saga – Korky (was miscredited as the voice of Gandor)
- Wild Arms 5 – Carol Anderson
