= South Park season 26 =

Season of television series

South Park
- Season 26
- Home media release cover
- No. of episodes: 6

Release
- Original network: Comedy Central
- Original release: February 8 – March 29, 2023

Season chronology
- ← Previous; Season 25 Next → Season 27

The twenty-sixth season of the American animated sitcom series South Park premiered on Comedy Central on February 8, 2023, and ended on March 29, 2023. The season consisted of six episodes, with each episode having next-day availability on HBO Max in the United States. With this season, South Park surpassed Arthur as the second longest-running animated series in the United States in terms of quantities of seasons, behind The Simpsons.

== Production ==
On January 17, 2023, Comedy Central released a teaser video announcing the upcoming debut of Season 26, but with no start date announced. On January 20, the video description was updated to announce a debut date of February 8, which was then confirmed by other sources including the official South Park Twitter feed.

== Episodes ==
No. overall	No. in season	Title	Directed by	Written by	Original release date	Prod. code	U.S. viewers (millions)
320	1	"Cupid Ye"	Matt Stone	Matt Stone	February 8, 2023	2601	0.48
Stan feels left out when Kyle and Tolkien form a bond in making TikToks together. Cartman attempts to ruin their newfound relationship with the help of Cupid Ye, but the latter uses it as a means to spread anti-Semitic propaganda about Kyle to students across the school.
321	2	"The Worldwide Privacy Tour"	Trey Parker	Trey Parker	February 15, 2023	2602	0.56
Kyle seeks out brand management when the Prince of Canada and his wife visit South Park and cause problems.
322	3	"Japanese Toilet"	Trey Parker	Trey Parker	March 1, 2023	2603	0.48
After their old toilet becomes too much of a hassle to use, Randy buys a new Japanese toilet and brags about it to everyone in town. However, the new toilet causes problems with others, prompting words of caution from Jimmy Valmer.
323	4	"Deep Learning"	Trey Parker	Trey Parker & ChatGPT	March 8, 2023	2604	0.47
Stan begins using ChatGPT to do his essays and text better messages to Wendy, bringing him into conflict with her, his classmates, and school officials.
324	5	"DikinBaus Hot Dogs"	Trey Parker	Trey Parker	March 22, 2023	2605	0.43
Cartman turns his hot dog accommodation into a fast food-selling amusement park area called DikinBaus Hot Dogs, but all of its funds are coming straight from Butters's paycheck.
325	6	"Spring Break"	Trey Parker	Trey Parker	March 29, 2023	2606	0.47
Mr. Garrison falls back into his political rallying habits while on vacation with Rick in South Carolina. Meanwhile, Randy tries to show Stan and Tolkien how to have a party when they decide to use their spring break time to play a game.

== Reception ==
Cathal Gunning with Screen Rant was disappointed with the season's format, criticizing its short run of episodes. Gunning said it was like Season 25, and that it was a disappointment to viewers who hoped that the season would not have a similar problem.

== Home media ==
The season was originally scheduled to be released on Blu-ray and DVD on September 12, 2023, but was delayed until November 7, 2023.

== See also ==
- South Park (Park County, Colorado)
- South Park City
