= Impact of the COVID-19 pandemic on television in the United States =

The onset of the COVID-19 pandemic in March 2020 substantially impacted the American television industry.

With the spread of the pandemic in the United States, almost all television entertainment production ceased, except those capable of being produced remotely and/or with reduced personnel.

By June, certain productions resumed after implementing social distancing guidelines, quarantine measures, and other public health protocols.

The pandemic resulted in the most impactful shutdown to the American television industry since the 2007–08 Writers Guild of America strike, which had disrupted nearly all television productions. The ensuing turbulent aftermath sees major reductions in the workforce and cancellations of shows right and left to save money on basic residuals and music licensing costs, which lead to the end of Peak TV and a worsening condition for writers and actors that eventually led to both the 2023 Writers Guild of America strike and 2023 SAG-AFTRA strike.

== Scripted programming ==
=== Initial suspension of production ===
The pandemic disrupted the production of many scripted television series. On March 10, 2020, Fox announced that a production member of the upcoming show Next had tested positive for COVID-19, just one week after the show finished production. Furthermore, the Disney+ series The Falcon and the Winter Soldier suspended its international production in Prague, where filming was discontinued after a week. Filming continued in Atlanta until filming statewide was eventually suspended two weeks later.

On March 12, Universal Television delayed shooting for the shows Russian Doll, Rutherford Falls, and Little America. A few hours later, NBCUniversal announced that 35 additional shows would suspend production, including unscripted shows. Programs such as those from the Chicago franchise, as well as Law & Order: Special Victims Unit, FBI, New Amsterdam, and Superstore had their productions suspended.

Furthermore, it was revealed that the production of the Amazon Prime Video show Carnival Row had been suspended. Carnival Row was filming in Prague at the time of the production shutdown. The same day, Netflix announced that production on the final season of Grace and Frankie would be suspended, as a number of the actors were at high risk for the virus due to their age.

Also on March 12, ViacomCBS announced that One Day at a Time would continue production without a studio audience; but on March 20, the executive producers stated that production had been suspended altogether. Apple suspended production of The Morning Show and Foundation as a precautionary measure. The following day, Apple suspended production on all upcoming shows.

On March 13, CBS Television Studios announced several programs would suspend production, including all series that are part of the NCIS franchise, Bull, Dynasty, Nancy Drew, Charmed, and The Good Fight. Most multi-camera sitcoms produced by CBS Television Studios had already completed production. The Neighborhood was set to film its season finale without a studio audience, but ultimately chose to suspend production the next day, scrapping the planned season finale episode.

The same day, AMC suspended production of Fear the Walking Dead and The Walking Dead. Also on March 13, Warner Bros. suspended production on multiple programs, including All Rise, Batwoman, Bob Hearts Abishola, Euphoria, The Flash, God Friended Me, Riverdale, Supergirl, Supernatural, and Young Sheldon. Concurrently, God Friended Me was also canceled by CBS, and its last-filmed episode was quickly retooled into a series finale, with some scenes utilizing stock footage from past episodes.

Lastly, Netflix announced that production on all its films and series in the United States and Canada would be suspended. Production in other countries would be assessed on a case-by-case basis.

20th Television and ABC Studios suspended production on multiple series, including Empire (which prematurely ended its final season), Pose, Queen of the South, American Housewife, Grey's Anatomy, American Horror Story and Genius. On March 14, Sony Pictures Television announced that it would suspend production on programs such as The Blacklist and The Goldbergs.

On March 15, MGM Television revealed that it had suspended production of The Handmaid's Tale, although already-filmed episodes were expected to air sometime in 2021. Another Hulu series, The Orville, also suspended production. Last Man Standing originally planned to film its season finale without a studio audience before ultimately suspending production. Both The Orville and Last Man Standing were among the last television series to suspend production. NBC pulled the April 7 episode of its medical drama New Amsterdam for sensitivity reasons, as it depicted a flu pandemic affecting New York City.

The big-three networks' soap operas also suspended production, as a result; CBS's The Bold and the Beautiful and The Young and the Restless, and ABC's General Hospital eventually ran out of first-run episodes by late April and late May, respectively. All three shows began to air themed reruns of classic episodes in the interim. To conserve first-run episodes, most soaps stopped airing first-run episodes on Fridays, while General Hospital added additional flashbacks from recent storylines to draw out its remaining inventory of episodes. By contrast, NBC's Days of Our Lives had enough of a backlog to last through October 2020. Viewership of soap operas saw gains as stay-at-home orders were imposed nationwide in late March. The Bold and the Beautiful and General Hospital saw their best ratings since March 2018, and Days of our Lives and The Young and the Restless saw their best ratings since 2019.

=== Later resumption of production ===
In late April 2020, Tyler Perry told Deadline Hollywood that he planned to resume production of programming at his Atlanta-based Tyler Perry Studios by June, with plans to test cast and crew members on-site before they traveled, and to sequester them on the Fort McPherson site's housing and barracks, as well as other purpose-built structures for the duration of production to create a bubble. Perry estimated that it would typically take two and a half weeks for a full season. To avoid potential infection spread, people would be quarantined until the results of a second test were received; and they would be tested again at least every four days afterward. Perry stated that he wrote his scripts with a smaller number of personnel and cast members in mind.

On April 30, the industry group Film Florida released a comprehensive series of recommendations and safety protocols for film and television production, which ranged from regular health screenings to limits on the number of on-site staff, not sharing microphones and other equipment, using clear barriers between actors when marking and establishing shots, and considerations regarding the use of personal protective equipment by crew members. The group noted that studios should "anticipate inefficiencies due to new procedures", and that the guidelines should be used in conjunction with other industry guidelines once established. On May 22, Georgia (which, primarily via the Atlanta area, has become a major southern hub for television and film production) became the first state government to formally release such guidelines, and drew guidance from local officials and studios, as well as from the Film Florida guidelines.

On June 5, Governor Gavin Newsom announced that film and television production in California could resume beginning June 12, subject to approval by county public health officers following a review of local conditions. The California Department of Public Health stated that workers "should abide by safety protocols agreed by labor and management, which may be further enhanced by the county public health officers." Los Angeles County Public Health Director Barbara Ferrer initially stated that she would not immediately allow film and television production, due to an increase in recent hospitalizations, but announced on June 10 that production would be covered under the next phase of local health orders to take effect June 12. That day, the Directors Guild of America, the International Alliance of Theatrical Stage Employees, the International Brotherhood of Teamsters, and SAG-AFTRA published "The Safe Way Forward", which details health and safety protocols agreed upon for union film and television productions. This includes regular testing of cast and crew members, closed sets, access zones, shooting limited to ten hours, and all productions requiring an on-set health safety supervisor.

On June 18, Deadline reported that NBCUniversal had begun an incremented return to work at its facilities, which included implementations of new protocols. NBCUniversal also performed in-house production of materials such as face masks and hand sanitizer via its Facilities and Administration department for use at other sites outside of California.

On June 17, at Television City, The Bold and the Beautiful became one of the first U.S. scripted television series to resume on-set tapings, although the production subsequently went on a one-week hiatus in order to accommodate modifications to its protocols to handle the larger number of tests needed. Scenes were filmed in such a way as to allow physical distancing on-set, and immediate family members of cast members were used as stand-ins during scenes that required intimacy. On June 23, it was reported that the resumption had been delayed by one day, as the studio needed to switch testing providers because tests provided by Television City had produced too many false positives. The Bold and the Beautiful began airing first-run episodes on July 20. General Hospital resumed production on July 22, and broadcast of first-run episodes resumed on August 3. Fellow CBS soap The Young and the Restless began airing new episodes on August 10, and Days of our Lives planned to resume production by September.

On July 25, Tyler Perry's BET series Sistas became one of the first U.S. scripted primetime series to complete a full season of filming under COVID-19-related safety protocols. Perry reported that there were four positive cases among extras and crew and that the start of production had faced a delay due to slower turnarounds for testing amidst a nationwide spike. While Perry hoped a vaccine would soon be available, he explained that "we are set up for the long haul, we could be here for a year and a half, two years, five years if we needed to." The second season of Tyler Perry's fellow production The Oval was completed on August 14.

Resumption of The Good Doctor in Vancouver was briefly disrupted by conflicts with local labor unions over the large amount of testing required by Sony Pictures Television. Those opposed to new restrictions cited Canadian requirements that already mandated 14 days of self-isolation upon entering the country and the relatively lower rate of transmission in the province of British Columbia at the time. Privacy issues with plans to contract private labs for testing were also cited as a factor. The impasse was resolved in mid-August.

On December 28, 2020, FilmLA published excerpts of a letter recently sent by Los Angeles County health officials, which recommended a temporary suspension of "higher risk" production activity due to the "catastrophic surge" of COVID-19 infections in the area. The surge resulted in a lack of ICU capacity, Governor Newsom referring to LA as the "epicenter" of COVID-19 in the country at that time, and the introduction of a mandatory 10-day self-isolation period for those returning from outside of Los Angeles County. On December 29, SAG-AFTRA's president and national executive director issued a statement indicating that the union was "closely monitoring the recent surge". As a result, most major LA-based television productions extended their pre-scheduled breaks for the holiday season through at least January 11, 2021, if not later. Some productions were reported to have resumed production around January 13, 2021.

In May 2022, the Alliance of Motion Picture and Television Producers (AMPTP) reached agreements to allow the loosening of COVID-19 protocols for transport and masking, for productions taking place in regions in the United States and Canada deemed to have a lower risk (including low hospital admissions).

=== Topical programming ===
The children's program Sesame Street produced two half-hour specials. The first – Sesame Street: Elmo's Playdate – dealt with the pandemic and socializing with others remotely. It premiered on April 14, 2020, and aired in simulcast across multiple WarnerMedia networks (including HBO, which has served as the current first-run broadcaster of the series since 2016) and the PBS Kids channel. The special was underwritten by WarnerMedia's parent company AT&T and aired commercial-free. Apple TV+ launched a spin-off of Fraggle Rock, Fraggle Rock: Rock On!, filmed entirely using iPhone smartphones from the performers' homes.

YouTube commissioned a mystery series from Sinking Ship Entertainment, Locked Down, for its YouTube Originals brand.

On April 30, NBC aired a one-off, remotely produced reunion episode of its sitcom Parks and Recreation, "A Parks and Recreation Special", in support of Feeding America.

In May, the CBS legal drama All Rise aired a topical episode, "Dancing at Los Angeles", as a replacement season finale. It was filmed from its actors' homes using videoconferencing, and depicted the in-universe version of the Los Angeles Superior Court conducting its first virtual bench trial due to the pandemic. Sister network Nickelodeon similarly produced a topical episode of its series Danger Force.

On May 22, Apple TV+'s Mythic Quest: Raven's Banquet released a special episode filmed using iPhone smartphones, showing the in-universe impact of the pandemic on its characters.

On July 16, NBC broadcast a one-off reunion episode of its sitcom 30 Rock; the episode was co-produced by NBCUniversal's creative services department and was intended to serve as its upfronts presentation instead of a physical event. It incorporated product placement and promotions for upcoming series across NBCUniversal properties (including, in particular, its new Peacock streaming service) and was remotely screened to advertising partners and the media earlier in the day. Due to its promotional nature, many NBC affiliates declined to broadcast the special in primetime.

On August 17, the PBS children's series Daniel Tiger's Neighborhood premiered "Won't You Sing Along With Me?", an episode dealing with the pandemic. It also produced related episodes revolving around themes such as doctors, separation anxiety, changes at school, and safety.

The Comedy Central animated series South Park broadcast a standalone, one-hour special, "The Pandemic Special", on September 30, satirizing the pandemic and the racial unrest that had emerged in the country over the summer. In March 2021, Comedy Central premiered a follow-up, "South ParQ Vaccination Special", which satirized the distribution of COVID-19 vaccines, and the QAnon conspiracy theory. Later in the year, the series premiered two "movie" specials exclusively for Paramount+, South Park: Post Covid and South Park: Post Covid: The Return of Covid, which feature the main cast as adults, still dealing with the pandemic 40 years later.

Several networks ordered scripted series set during the pandemic, including Joanna Johnson's Love in the Time of Corona for Freeform, Jenji Kohan's anthology Social Distance for Netflix, Martin Gero and Brendan Gall's Connecting for NBC (which was ordered straight-to-series), and a remote workplace comedy being developed by Ben Silverman and Paul Lieberstein of The Office.

Several returning programs addressed the pandemic as a plot point in their episodes, including Black-ish and The Conners, the fourth season premiere of The Good Doctor, Superstore (which satirized safety protocols being taken by retail stores and the branding of their employees as "essential workers"), NCIS: New Orleans (whose seventh season is set during the initial onset of the pandemic in Louisiana), and Bull.

== Unscripted programming ==
=== Suspension of production ===
In mid-March 2020, Sony Pictures suspended production of its game shows Wheel of Fortune and Jeopardy! (Jeopardy! host Alex Trebek had a weakened immune system due to his pancreatic cancer). Other postponed productions included American Ninja Warrior, Card Sharks, The Price Is Right, and The Real Housewives of New Jersey.

The ABC reality series The Bachelorette delayed filming for its sixteenth season, which was set to premiere on May 18. A retrospective spin-off, The Bachelor: The Greatest Seasons – Ever!, premiered on June 8, featuring highlights and behind-the-scenes footage of past seasons of The Bachelor and The Bachelorette. On April 29, Variety reported that The Bachelor spin-off series Bachelor in Paradise had postponed its seventh season to 2021 and that ABC was pursuing filming The Bachelorette over the summer for a fall premiere. ABC also delayed a planned seniors spin-off of The Bachelor (which eventually premiered in 2023 as The Golden Bachelor on its inaugural season), and shelved a Summer Olympics-themed follow-up to The Bachelor Winter Games.

Prometheus Entertainment claimed that its productions of the History programs Ancient Aliens, The Curse of Oak Island, and The UnXplained were exempt from Los Angeles' stay-at-home order, which declared "front line news reporters, studio, and technicians for newsgathering and reporting" to be "essential critical infrastructure workers". President Kevin Burns, according to The Hollywood Reporter, told employees that they needed to "get over it" and that they were "hysterical"; the company required staff to attend to work through at least March 20.

The CBS reality series The Amazing Race stopped production on its 33rd season in Glasgow, Scotland, in late February, after filming three out of 12 episodes less than a week into a three-week scheduled production run, as its route was originally to travel to Lapland in Sweden, and would continue through Austria before passing to Northern Italy—which would become one of the first major epicenters of the COVID-19 pandemic in the western world. The route would cross into Nepal, Vietnam, Thailand, Australia, Chile, and Peru in an eastward direction, which included its final destination city of Indianapolis, Indiana. The season resumed filming in September 2021, with travel restrictions in place, its course modified to go through European countries with high vaccination rates (including Switzerland, France, Greece, and Portugal) and used a Titan Airways charter plane for the rest of the production, with the final destination city being changed to Los Angeles. The preceding 32nd season, filmed in late 2018, was also postponed to a fall premiere. Production of the 41st and 42nd seasons of Survivor, which were due to film in Fiji at the end of the months of March and May, respectively, was postponed to 2021 (Fiji had also closed its borders to non-citizens). While the program's producers aimed to potentially begin production of season 41 in May for a fall premiere, that did not come to fruition, and the next season of S.W.A.T. (originally scheduled to be produced for midseason) was moved to CBS's provisional fall schedule in July 2020.

Fox dancing competition series So You Think You Can Dance was preparing to begin production on its 17th season in mid-March, but it was postponed indefinitely on June 18. On February 16, 2021, TVLine reported that Fox and the show's producers still had no plans for season 17 to move forward at that time. In March 2022, it was announced that the series would return to Fox in the summer of that year.

A new television series adaptation of Douglas Adams' The Hitchhiker's Guide to the Galaxy has most likely been delayed. However, a production outlet claimed that the series began production in May 2021.

=== Return to production, modifications ===
Fremantle initially announced that the fifteenth season of America's Got Talent (NBC), and Season 22 of Family Feud (syndicated), would film without an audience. Starting the week of March 10, Fremantle began displaying disclaimers in the end credits for The Price Is Right (CBS) during episodes recorded from late 2019 (season 48) into many 2021 (season 49) episodes, disclosing that producers would arrange substitute prizes for contestants who won trips as prizes for locales impacted by the pandemic. When production resumed in October 2020 for season 49, the disclaimer was changed to note that the traditional rule that trips must be taken within one year of the air date was changed to two years, although with further restrictions prizes could change.

ABC's primetime reboot of Who Wants to Be a Millionaire quickly filmed over eight episodes' worth of material during the weekend of March 14 (they wrapped production one day sooner than scheduled). The program was filmed with no studio audience beyond staff present on-set, which resulted in the replacement of its "Ask the Audience" lifeline with "Ask the Host" (a new lifeline that was originally introduced in the recent revival of the British version). The program's new host, Jimmy Kimmel, credited his early career in radio for helping him adapt to the environment. The second run of episodes was scheduled for a fall premiere, featuring a mixture of celebrity contestants and frontline workers.

After filming without an audience for the remainder of its audition rounds, the 15th season of America's Got Talent suspended production on March 14; filming of the auditions was originally scheduled to conclude on March 20. To help attract additional contestants, NBC announced on April 1 that it would open a new round of online auditions. By April 27, production staff decided that the season would premiere on May 26 as planned. The show ultimately resumed production in June with a streamlined version of its "Judge Cuts" round, in an outdoor stage setting in Simi Valley, California, with enhanced safety protocols and remote performances. The live quarter-finals (which, due to the revised Judge Cuts format, also had a larger field with four heats rather than three, as in past seasons) were held at Universal Studios Hollywood rather than the Dolby Theatre. There was a mix of pre-recorded remote performances and in-person performances emanating from various locations around the park and the Universal Studios Lot.

The 18th season of American Idol (ABC) and the 18th season of The Voice (NBC) both switched to remote formats, with their contestants and judging panels conducting the program from their homes. Production of the second season of La Voz—the Spanish-language adaptation of The Voice on NBC's sister network Telemundo—was suspended; studio production later resumed with the live rounds on July 26, 2020, with enhanced safety protocols and no studio audience. Similar changes were adopted by season 19 of The Voice, which premiered in October 2020.

The third season of The Masked Singer (Fox) had already completed filming before pandemic-related restrictions took effect, but post-production was performed remotely, and allusions to the pandemic were added in post-production of its final episodes—such as dialogue by Night Angel referencing the panic buying of toilet paper. After filming of the competition wrapped, a performance of "What the World Needs Now Is Love" dedicated to first responders was filmed for the "Road to the Finals" recap show, which featured Dionne Warwick and the remaining three finalists.

Live PD (A&E) transitioned to remote production in April 2020 after a pre-scheduled hiatus. On April 3 and 4, the series aired hour-long Live PD: Special Edition episodes, featuring segments highlighting responses to the pandemic by government officials and first responders (as opposed to its normal format, which follows patrols by police officers). On June 10, after having been suspended on June 6 in the wake of the George Floyd protests, the program was canceled by A&E and its producers.

The live finale of Survivor's 40th season (Winners at War) aired as scheduled on CBS, but it was conducted in a remote format with host Jeff Probst hosting from a small set located in his garage. In February 2021, Fiji's ministry of trade and commerce minister Faiyaz Koya announced that production for the show's 41st season could begin after multiple delays. Production for the series resumed in April 2021 with COVID protocols in place for the crew, contestants, and people of Fiji. One major change the show experienced during its resumption of production was shortening filming to 26 days instead of the usual 39. The production team also decided that the season's winner would be revealed on location during the final Tribal Council, for the first time since the original season (Borneo), as they were unsure of the ability to have a live finale. The vote reveal was then followed by a Survivor After Show special featuring the final players and the jury, rather than a live reunion.

The second season of Love Island (CBS) was set to premiere on May 21, but production (which had been scheduled to occur in Fiji) was suspended indefinitely. On August 5, CBS announced that Love Island would premiere on August 24, and would be set at The Cromwell casino hotel in Las Vegas. ABC's Shark Tank also elected to film its upcoming season in a larger "bubble" setting in the Las Vegas area, rather than Los Angeles.

After being delayed from its usual June premiere, the 22nd season of Big Brother (CBS) – Big Brother All-Stars – premiered on August 5. The format already takes place in an isolated living environment, but the houseguests were tested and quarantined prior to entering the Big Brother house and tested weekly. Live shows were held without a studio audience.

New and returning game shows also adopted similar changes, including remote auditions, reduction of on-site staff, no studio audiences, and set modifications for physical distancing or other factors. Wheel of Fortune introduced handheld, cap-like grips, dubbed "the white thing" by host Pat Sajak, to grab the pegs of the eponymous wheel without making direct contact with participants. Fellow syndicated game show 25 Words or Less divided its in-studio contestants and celebrities into "pods", with host Meredith Vieira presenting the show remotely from her home in New York City. CBS's The Price is Right resumed production in October for its 49th season, with no studio audience, and accommodations made to its set and all of its current pricing games, in order to comply with health and safety protocols. Its sister show Let's Make a Deal maintained a smaller audience, which consisted of the episode's contestants, while remote audience members could also participate in the show via videoconferencing, a procedure that ran until the end of season 14 in June 2023. Jeopardy! and Wheel both resumed admitting studio audiences for their 39th and 40th seasons in September 2022. The Price is Right reinstated a full audience for season 52 in 2023, after moving from Television City to Glendale.

Fox resumed production of its new music game show I Can See Your Voice in August 2020, after production was suspended with one episode completed. Starting with the second episode, the show was taped with only essential personnel and no audience.

The fourth season of The Masked Singer commenced production a few weeks later. Among noted production changes were extensions of protocols already used to conceal the identities of the performers, a re-location from Television City to Red Studios Hollywood in order to have a larger "bubble", increased use of "virtual reality" effects on-stage, and the use of "quarantining and various camera tricks" to preserve the visible presence of an audience (by using stock footage of audiences from past episodes). The format of the competition was adjusted to reduce the number of times each contestant needed to perform, and live-action "clue packages" were largely substituted for animated shorts to reduce the amount of filming needed. Regular panelist Ken Jeong's experience as a physician and his work with executive producer Craig Plestis on I Can See Your Voice (which Jeong hosted and co-executive produced), were leveraged as part of the production.

The 19th season of American Idol reworked its preliminary "Idol Across America" auditions to use a remote format rather than a nationwide tour (which also had the effect of enhancing the accessibility of the auditions process). The show limited its audition tapings to three locations in California (Los Angeles, Ojai, and San Diego), with auditioners being flown in from outside of the regions. For the live rounds, the show reintroduced a smaller live audience in a wider studio. As an opportunity for them to perform live for a studio audience, 10 contestants from season 18 were invited back on April 19 to compete for a wild card spot in the top 10.

The 16th season of America's Got Talent filmed its auditions with a limited audience, and used stock footage from previous seasons to preserve the visible presence of a full audience. Filming of the live rounds returned to Dolby Theatre with a full audience as normal, but with audience members required to be vaccinated and masked.

The Food Network modified two of its Guy Fieri-hosted series, Diners, Drive-Ins and Dives, and Guy's Grocery Games, to use remote formats, with Triple D featuring discussion of the pandemic's impact on the restaurant industry, and Fieri cooking meals at home using ingredients sent by featured chefs, and Guy's Grocery Games using a modified format where chefs are sent mystery packages with ingredients for each challenge to cook at home.

=== Topical programming ===
On March 30, 2020, Nickelodeon broadcast #KidsTogether: The Nickelodeon Town Hall, as part of a larger campaign promoting COVID-19 awareness to youth and their parents.

TLC premiered a spin-off of 90 Day Fiancé, 90 Day Fiancé: Self-Quarantined, on April 20, which follows the impact of the pandemic on series alumni. The series uses self-recorded video and videoconferencing. The network also announced Find Love Live, an interactive dating game show conducted via videoconferencing, as a three-week event series premiering on May 10. In June 2020, TLC renewed Find Love Live for additional episodes set to begin June 22.

On May 6, Nickelodeon ordered two remotely produced series, the youth talk show Group Chat, and game show Game Face—where contestants guess the identity of celebrities concealed by augmented reality camera filters; the latter premiered in June as Nickelodeon's Unfiltered. On May 7, Fox premiered Celebrity Watch Party, a 10-episode U.S. adaptation of the long-running British series Gogglebox (where individuals are filmed watching and discussing television programs at their homes).

On May 11, Food Network premiered Amy Schumer Learns to Cook, a home-filmed cooking show starring comedian Amy Schumer and her husband Chris Fischer. In July 2020, the channel also premiered a spin-off of Restaurant: Impossible, Back in Business, featuring host Robert Irvine revisiting restaurants from past episodes to help them adapt to the impact of the pandemic on restaurants.

On May 29, CBS aired the Jerry O'Connell and Rebecca Romijn–hosted special Haircut Night in America, which focused on providing advice for DIY hairstyling.

On July 6, E! premiered Celebrity Game Face—a remote game show hosted and produced by Kevin Hart and played between teams of celebrity couples. Initially aired as a one-off special, E! would later give the series a full order of five additional episodes beginning in August, and renewed the series for further seasons. On July 13, E! also premiered Celebrity Call Center, a series featuring celebrities engaging in remote conversations with members of the general public.

In November 2020, TBS ordered a U.S. adaptation of The Container Cup – a Belgian format developed in the wake of lockdowns, where celebrities and athletes compete in sports challenges delivered to their homes inside shipping containers rigged with cameras.

== Talk shows and variety programs ==
On March 10 and 11, a number of talk shows announced they would begin filming without a studio audience, this included both daytime (such as Walt Disney Television's Live with Kelly and Ryan, Strahan, Sara & Keke, The View) and Late-night talk shows. Beginning March 12, a number of talk shows – including those which had planned before to tape without an audience – announced they would suspend production entirely. Both The Late Show with Stephen Colbert (CBS) and The Tonight Show Starring Jimmy Fallon (NBC) already had hiatuses scheduled in late March. The View continued production, but panelist Joy Behar, and later Whoopi Goldberg, would begin appearing remotely due to health concerns, and the show modified its set for social distancing on March 17, by replacing the panel's table with what Goldberg described as a "big-ass desk".

On March 12, The Late Show, The Tonight Show, and Jimmy Kimmel Live! (ABC, with guest host Pete Buttigieg) all aired one final studio-based episode with no audience, while Late Night with Seth Meyers (NBC) shelved its originally planned episode after its scheduled guests declined to attend. Meyers still filmed that night's "A Closer Look" segment, which was posted on the show's YouTube channel. Last Week Tonight (HBO) filmed one more episode from an alternate, undisclosed location (due to the closure of the CBS Broadcast Center, its usual studio, for disinfection), with host John Oliver announcing that the show would go on hiatus.

=== Migration to remote formats ===
In the wake of the suspensions, late-night hosts such as Stephen Colbert, Jimmy Fallon, Jimmy Kimmel, and Seth Meyers began to produce topical videos for YouTube from their homes or other locations, with a focus on monologues and celebrity interviews performed via videoconferencing (while Kimmel also experimented with an in-person interview of Bill Burr by doing it from his car, and taping an iPad to his side window to use as a camera). While primarily distributed on digital platforms such as YouTube, from March 16 to 18, CBS aired Colbert's segments on television to augment reruns of The Late Show (replacing the original opening segment of each episode; the dates had originally been scheduled for original episodes before a regularly scheduled hiatus for the canceled NCAA basketball tournament), while NBC began to similarly air Fallon's segments on March 18.

The following week, NBC announced that it would continue with, and expand, Fallon's "At Home Edition" format (interspersing new segments with highlights from past episodes), while several other news satire and talk shows announced that they would also return to air that week with episodes filmed from their hosts' homes or other locations, including The Daily Show (Comedy Central; billed as The Daily Social Distancing Show), Full Frontal with Samantha Bee (TBS, billed as the Little Show in the Big Woods as it was filmed in Bee's backyard), Last Week Tonight (which symbolically used a set with a white "void" as its backdrop, later personified with an animated face voiced by H. Jon Benjamin), and fellow HBO series Real Time with Bill Maher. The Late Show announced on March 25 that it would return in a similar format on March 30 (billed as A Late Show with Stephen Colbert), while Jimmy Kimmel Live! announced a similar move on March 27 – making it the last of the big three networks' late-night shows to make such a transition. Fellow Comedy Central late-night program Lights Out with David Spade was suspended, and later canceled by the network due to low ratings. The Daily Show was expanded to 45 minutes beginning April 27 as a partial replacement.

A variety of daytime talk shows adopted a similar format, including The Ellen DeGeneres Show, The View, and The Talk. After a primetime special on March 30, The Late Late Show with James Corden returned to the air with a similar format on April 13, with host James Corden presenting the program from his garage.

NBC's late-night sketch comedy series Saturday Night Live suspended production on March 16, before returning with its own "at-home" episode on April 11, with sketches and music performances recorded or produced remotely from its cast members' and musicians' homes, and hosted by actor and COVID-19 patient Tom Hanks. After becoming the second-highest-rated episode of the season, NBC announced that a second episode with a similar format would air on April 25. An At Home season finale aired on May 9, hosted by Kristen Wiig.

The annual PBS Independence Day special A Capitol Fourth canceled its live concert in favor of recorded segments (including highlights of past editions in honor of the program's 40th anniversary, and tributes to first responders and African Americans), although the live fireworks on Capitol Hill would still go on and be televised. The Macy's 4th of July Fireworks Spectacular special on NBC similarly relied on recorded performances from various locations (including the Grand Ole Opry and the Prairie Sun Recording Studios), and the fireworks themselves were launched from locations in each New York City borough on multiple nights (with each night's location only revealed shortly before to avoid prolonged gatherings), which were then compiled for broadcast. Despite the easing of health orders, A Capital Fourth still canceled its concert in 2021, as the show was already planned to use the previous year's format.

NBC's A Little Late with Lilly Singh pre-recorded the entirety of its first season in late 2019, with original episodes running through May 2020. NBC renewed the series for a second season that month; A Little Late returned in January 2021 with a retooled format, eschewing the studio setting for a Los Angeles house with crew on-site to accommodate the creative preferences of host Lilly Singh. During the season premiere, Singh commented upon viewers who were concerned as to why the show's first season was still airing first-run episodes with a studio audience, noting that the episodes had been filmed "back in 2019 when the only people wearing masks were robbers and Jim Carrey."

=== Return to studio-based production ===
On July 6, 2020, after having used an at-home format, TBS's Conan became the first U.S. late-night show to begin airing episodes from outside of the host's home. Host Conan O'Brien presented the program from the historic Coronet Theatre in Los Angeles with limited on-site staff. The program continued to use remote interviews and was filmed without a studio audience (besides assistant Sona Movsesian).

On July 13, The Tonight Show became the first U.S. late-night talk show to return to taping at their normal facility (although at NBC Studios' Studio 6A with a new set rather than Studio 6B, where the show usually originates), with a limited on-site crew (including its house band The Roots) and no in-studio audience or interviews. The program hosted its first in-studio music performance from 6A on August 11, with Trey Anastasio performing a song from his album Lonely Trip with The Roots.

On August 6, 2020, CBS announced that its late-night shows would return to studio tapings with no audience on August 10; The Late Show returned to the Ed Sullivan Theater building but not the auditorium proper, using a smaller, secondary set modeled on Colbert's office in the building. Meanwhile, The Late Late Show returned to a reconfigured version of its normal studio (with its sofa replaced by a single armchair for Corden, and audience seats removed). Usher was the show's first in-person guest since the start of the pandemic; the segment was initially presented as being a glitchy remote interview, featuring a parody of "My Boo", which Corden titled "My Zoom", before Usher suddenly emerged from backstage. On September 14, Corden temporarily hosted from home, after being required to self-isolate due to a possible COVID-19 exposure outside of the studio. The rest of the program's staff remained in studio, with Corden appearing on stage via a monitor atop his desk.

Jimmy Kimmel Live! resumed production at the Hollywood Masonic Temple when Kimmel returned from his summer break (which had been covered by hiatuses and guest hosts) on September 21. Live with Kelly and Ryan also returned to studio production for its new season, using a wider desk for physical distancing between hosts Kelly Ripa and Ryan Seacrest, but with a split screen effect for the main camera angle designed to make them appear closer together. Saturday Night Live returned to in-studio production for season 46 (which premiered October 3), with executive producer Lorne Michaels stating that they also planned to have a "limited" studio audience. Each audience member was legally considered to be part of the cast and crew of the production, to facilitate compliance with New York state health orders, and each received a $150 payment from Universal Television for their participation.

In January 2021, Jimmy Kimmel Live and The Late Late Show announced that they would temporarily return to at-home formats, following recommendations issued by the Los Angeles County Department of Public Health. On March 22, 2021, The Tonight Show returned to Studio 6B for the first time since March 12, 2020, with a downsized studio audience of 58 healthcare workers and first responders, making it the first of the major networks' late-night talk shows to return to having an in-person audience. Fallon stated that having an in-person audience for the first time in over a year felt like "performing at a sold-out Madison Square Garden."

On May 24, 2021, The Late Show announced plans to return to its main studio on June 14, 2021, with a full-capacity audience; all audience members would have to be fully vaccinated in compliance with New York state health orders and current CDC guidance. Shortly afterward, The Tonight Show announced it would return to a full-capacity audience on June 7, which made it the first U.S. late-night talk show to do so in terms of airdate. For its final two weeks before its series finale on June 24, Conan added a studio audience at the Coronet, becoming the first L.A.-based late-night talk show to have a live audience. On June 21, Jimmy Kimmel Live! introduced a fully vaccinated, half-capacity audience (in compliance with California public health orders). On September 13, after a summer hiatus, The Daily Show relocated to a new studio at ViacomCBS's One Astor Plaza in Times Square; while it planned to reintroduce a studio audience, this was delayed due to Omicron variant, and an audience would later be reintroduced after The Daily Show returned to its usual filming location in March 2022.

Saturday Night Live would face a major disruption on December 18, 2021, due to an ongoing surge of cases in New York City tied to the Omicron variant. As a cautionary measure, that episode would be filmed with no audience, and a limited cast and crew. Michael Che and Kenan Thompson were the only regulars present, joined by host Paul Rudd, as well as Tom Hanks and Tina Fey (who made a surprise appearance to congratulate Rudd on his fifth time hosting SNL). Charli XCX's scheduled performance was cut, although she still appeared in a pre-recorded music video sketch. Fey also filled in for Colin Jost during Weekend Update with Che; the segment was performed from chairs on the main stage rather than its usual newsroom set. Due to the reduced cast, the rest of the episode consisted of a compilation of Christmas-themed sketches from past episodes, introduced by the cast and guests. The following Tuesday, Fox announced that it would cancel its New Year's Eve Toast & Roast 2022 special for the same reason.

Both Late Night with Seth Meyers and The Late Late Show with James Corden suspended production in January 2022 due to their hosts' testing positive for COVID-19. Late Night went to a remote format beginning January 10, while The Late Late Show was suspended until January 18.

=== New programming ===
==== New variety programming ====
Various specials featuring musicians performing from their homes emerged, including Fox's iHeart Living Room Concert for America (which aired in place of the 2020 iHeartRadio Music Awards, and was simulcast by iHeartMedia radio stations and Fox Corporation cable channels), a CBS special featuring Garth Brooks and Trisha Yearwood, ACM Presents: Our Country (a similar multi-artist program aired in place of the postponed ACM Awards, also on CBS), The Disney Family Singalong (an ABC special on April 16, which featured karaoke performances of songs from Disney franchises with celebrity guests, and PSAs in support of Feeding America), One World: Together at Home (which aired on April 18 as a multi-network simulcast across ABC, CBS, NBC, and various other cable networks and streaming services), Saturday Night Seder (streamed live of April 11), and Saving Our Selves (aired by BET on April 22, with a particular focus on the pandemic's impact on African-American communities).

On May 16, the major networks and various other outlets simulcast Graduate Together: America Honors the High School Class of 2020, a national special honoring graduating students.

==== New talk programming ====
AMC premiered a new weekly talk show on April 17, Friday Night In with The Morgans, hosted by Jeffrey Dean Morgan (of AMC series The Walking Dead) and his wife Hilarie Burton from their farm in New York, featuring remote interviews and other segments dealing with the pandemic. On May 4, AMC ordered additional episodes of the series.

== Impact on scheduling ==
Upon the start of COVID-19-related restrictions, broadcasters were forced to rely on their remaining inventory of completed programs that had not yet aired, and the remaining completed episodes of series whose productions were interrupted.

Due to factors such as the need to ration episodes that had already completed production, some programs faced scheduling changes (such as replacing double-runs of new episodes with single episodes), delays of their scheduled premieres, or dividing seasons of programs with natural hiatuses (with the remaining episodes airing at a later date once production resumed). In May, both ABC and CBS filled portions of their schedules with films from their parent companies, with CBS airing CBS Sunday Night Movies on Sunday nights (featuring Paramount Pictures films), and ABC reviving The Wonderful World of Disney to air a series of Pixar, Walt Disney Animation Studios, and Marvel Studios films on Wednesday nights.

In April 2020, it was reported that the major broadcast networks had begun to develop contingency plans in case of extended disruptions (especially if they were to impact fall series for the 2020–21 television season), including the possibility of filling schedules with series from co-owned cable networks and streaming services, or importing programs new to American audiences from other countries such as Canada.

=== Impact on the 2020–21 network television season ===
Most fall television premieres occur from mid-to-late September through October. Due to production delays, the Big Three networks initially targeted premieres for their scripted series by the end of fall, but with no specific dates set. With the steady resumption of production, the networks began to set premiere dates from late October through mid-November. Some of NBC's fall programming, as well as all of Fox and The CW's fall, scripted programming, was deferred to midseason premieres in 2021.

Due to their quick turnaround time in comparison to scripted series, the production of non-scripted programs (including game shows and reality shows) was also expedited by networks to fill gaps in their lineups. With the delayed premieres and increased production costs due to safety protocols, it was reported that scripted dramas would likely not air full 22-episode seasons, with CBS having already reduced orders for CBS Studios' dramas and sitcoms to either 16 or 18 episodes in October 2020, and negotiating similar reductions for series from other studios.

==== ABC ====
On September 17, premiere dates were announced for ABC's lineup, with October premieres announced for reality series such as The Bachelorette, Dancing with the Stars, and Shark Tank, and game shows (including held over episodes from its Sunday night summer block of Celebrity Family Feud, Press Your Luck, and Match Game on Thursday nights, and Supermarket Sweep, Card Sharks and Who Wants to Be a Millionaire on Sundays). ABC's sitcoms would largely return in late October, and the return of selected dramas (including the new series Big Sky) was set for mid-November, although Stumptown would be canceled by the network and replaced by For Life.

The Bachelor, Mixed-ish, and The Rookie, along with the new series Call Your Mother, were scheduled for premieres in January 2021. ABC also scheduled several new and returning game shows to its winter lineup, including a new season of To Tell the Truth, and a "Winter Fun & Games" block on Thursday nights (spun off from its summer "Sunday Fun & Games" block) featuring the new series Celebrity Wheel of Fortune, The Chase, and The Hustler.

After not airing new seasons in the summer of 2020, season 17 of The Bachelorette, Bachelor in Paradise, and The $100,000 Pyramid were scheduled to return for ABC's summer lineup. Coming off the success of the delayed season 16 as a fall series, ABC would premiere season 18 of The Bachelorette during its 2021–22 fall lineup.

==== CBS ====
CBS pushed back Season 32 of The Amazing Race to a fall premiere, with the new sports panel show Game On! moved up to fill its spot on the summer schedule. CBS Entertainment President Kelly Kahl explained that they hoped their scripted programs could return to production "at some point this summer", and that they could have "most if not all of these shows on at some point in the fall." Kahl did not rule out other contingencies. On July 13, CBS moved up S.W.A.T. to a fall premiere to replace Survivor, which was unable to resume production in time.

On August 26, CBS announced that it would air reruns of series from sister properties, such as the fourth season of One Day at a Time (Pop) and the first season of Star Trek: Discovery (CBS All Access, which would double as promotion for the upcoming third season). Its filming was completed in February, with post-production done remotely. The acquired series Manhunt: Deadly Games (acquired from cable provider Charter Communications) was set to round out CBS's late-summer/early-fall schedule.

CBS announced on September 17 that Sunday Night Movies (which CBS introduced in May as a limited run to fill timeslots held by suspended programming) would air for six weeks through October and November, to fill timeslots until its scripted lineup resumed production. As before, they drew from the library of corporate sibling Paramount Pictures.

On October 13, fall premiere dates were announced for CBS's scripted lineup, which began with its Chuck Lorre sitcoms of Mom, Young Sheldon, and the new series B Positive on November 5, NCIS: Los Angeles and New Orleans on November 8 (with the 10 p.m. hour being filled by "fan favorite" episodes of NCIS), S.W.A.T. on November 11, The Neighborhood, Bob Hearts Abishola, and All Rise on November 16, and NCIS on November 17. Ahead of their return to daytime, CBS scheduled several primetime episodes of its daytime game shows The Price is Right and Let's Make a Deal, beginning with episodes of both featuring essential workers on October 27.

CBS scheduled Clarice, The Equalizer, and a new season of Tough as Nails for its February lineup, with The Equalizer premiering after Super Bowl LV. After not airing in the fall of 2020 or spring of 2021, Survivor returned to the air as part of the network's 2021–22 season.

==== Fox ====
Fox announced plans for its fall lineup in May 2020, having deferred most of its scripted live-action programs to midseason (animated series such as The Simpsons can be readily produced on a remote basis). The new summer dramas Filthy Rich and neXt were pushed back to fall premieres. The fourth season of The Masked Singer was to initially be joined on Wednesday nights by a new season of MasterChef Junior, while Fox also acquired network premieres of L.A.'s Finest (a series originally picked up by Charter after being turned down by NBC) and Cosmos: Possible Worlds (from former sister network National Geographic, which premiered on that channel earlier in the year) for the fall lineup and Thursdays and Fridays would be filled by Thursday Night Football (notwithstanding postponements due to NFL COVID-19 protocols) and WWE SmackDown.

In August 2020, Fox pushed back MasterChef Junior in favor of I Can See Your Voice, a new music game show that was able to resume production in August. For its winter lineup, Fox acquired a revival of Name That Tune to accompany the Masked Singer spin-off The Masked Dancer, which was filmed in Australia (a country that had significantly stronger management of the pandemic than the United States at the time of filming) with contestants of American descent. The new season of MasterChef Junior eventually premiered on March 17, 2022.

==== NBC ====
On May 14, 2020, NBC announced that it had acquired the Canadian medical drama Transplant. In Canada, where the series aired at midseason on CTV, Transplant was the most-watched domestic production of the television season.

In June, a provisional fall schedule was unveiled, with only one new series premiere originally planned (the Law & Order: Special Victims Unit spin-off Law & Order: Organized Crime), and no specific premiere dates announced. In August, NBC replaced New Amsterdam with Transplant for a September 1 premiere, and announced that the 12th season of American Ninja Warrior (which filmed at The Dome in St. Louis from late June to mid-July) would premiere on September 7.

On August 27, NBC announced premiere dates for several fall series, including a revival of the quiz show Weakest Link hosted by Jane Lynch on September 28, the new videoconference-based sitcom Connecting on October 1, the fourth season of Ellen's Game of Games on October 6, season 19 of The Voice on October 19, Superstore on October 22, and The Blacklist, the Chicago franchise, Law & Order SVU, and This Is Us, all during the week of November 9. The network deferred its remaining fall series (including Brooklyn Nine-Nine, Law & Order: Organized Crime, Manifest, and New Amsterdam, among others) to midseason.

On September 9, NBC bumped Weakest Link to Tuesday nights with a September 29 premiere, in favor of a second new episode of Dateline on Monday nights from September 21 to October 12 (with Weakest Link moving to Mondays to accompany The Voice beginning October 19). On September 23, NBC moved up the season premiere of This Is Us to October 27, with series creator Dan Fogelman later stating that the decision came from his desire for its first two episodes to air before election day. The next day, Connecting would be pushed back to October 8, and Superstore to October 29.

In November, NBC canceled Connecting and pulled it from its schedule, with the three remaining episodes burned off on Peacock. On November 10, 2020, NBC acquired another Canadian medical drama, Nurses. Midseason premieres included the new series Mr. Mayor and returning series The Wall and Zoey's Extraordinary Playlist in January 2021, the new series Kenan and Young Rock in February, and New Amsterdam, season 20 of The Voice, and new series Debris in March.

==== The CW ====
The CW deferred most of its fall scripted premieres to January 2021. The second half of the final season of Supernatural (which had been deferred to fall 2020 due to the pandemic, with two episodes left to film) would be joined by a lineup of acquisitions, non-scripted series, and delayed summer series for the network's late-summer and fall lineups, such as new seasons of The Outpost, Pandora, Penn & Teller: Fool Us, Two Sentence Horror Stories, Whose Line Is It Anyway?, and the new series World's Funniest Animals. It also acquired linear premieres of series from CBS and WarnerMedia's streaming services CBS All Access (Tell Me a Story) and DC Universe (Swamp Thing), and imported series from the UK and Canada such as Being Rueben, Coroner, Dead Pixels, Devils, Fridge Wars, Killer Camp, and Taskmaster (although Taskmaster would be pulled after its premiere due to low viewership).

Many of The CW's scripted programs are typically filmed in Canada, which had relatively better management of the pandemic than the United States. In March 2021, The CW ordered a second season of Killer Camp as an original series for the next season, but the series was cancelled after two episodes due to low ratings.

== News ==
=== Modified broadcasting ===
Amidst their coverage, television newscasts and news channels encouraged physical distancing on-set, remote work, and increased use of remote interviews – in order to comply with CDC guidelines. In-person interviews (universally with the reporter both shooting and editing their story alone) often used improvised setups to allow distancing, such as microphone extensions adapted from monopods and improvised PVC pipe booms. Local newscasts faced similar changes, with stations often limiting newscasts to one studio anchor (or two if physically distanced), and minimally staffed newsrooms. Local newscasters began remote working in some cases, with a small number of staff remaining at the studio. Some meteorologists already had this capability, in order to provide coverage of severe weather events during overnight hours, in case no one else is present at the studio.

On March 15, a one-on-one debate for the 2020 Democratic presidential primaries took place between former Vice President Joe Biden and Senator Bernie Sanders. After initially intending to hold the event at its original venue in Phoenix, Arizona, with no audience or outside press, the debate was re-located to a studio at CNN's Washington, D.C. bureau. It turned out to be the only debate during the pandemic, as Biden clinched the Democratic nomination shortly thereafter. Biden subsequently conducted media appearances and meetings from his home in Delaware via videoconferencing.

Two of the Big Three networks' national morning shows—ABC's Good Morning America and NBC's Today—continued to have in-studio anchors in New York City, although some anchors were temporarily moved home, including Today's Al Roker and Craig Melvin (as a precaution after a staff member of the program tested positive with mild symptoms), and GMA's Robin Roberts (as a precaution due to past medical issues) and George Stephanopoulos.

On March 11, the CBS Broadcast Center facility in New York City was closed for disinfection after two employees tested positive, resulting in CBS This Morning temporarily moving to the set of the CBS Evening News in Washington, D.C., and the newscasts of CBS-owned (O&O) New York station WCBS-TV being produced and anchored remotely from the studios of its sister stations in California. While the CBS Broadcast Center re-opened on March 13, it was closed once again on March 18. CBS This Morning subsequently moved to the set of The Late Show with Stephen Colbert at the Ed Sullivan Theater, before switching to a remotely anchored format by late March to minimize staff amidst increasing numbers of cases in the region. CBSN programs (including the CBS Weekend News) were produced from other CBS O&Os and affiliates, and WCBS-TV newscasts were once again produced from Los Angeles sister station KCBS-TV, but with the anchors later appearing from the Stamford, Connecticut, studio of the New York Yankees' regional sports network YES Network for a period.

A WCBS-produced primetime newscast on WUPA—a CBS-owned The CW affiliate in Atlanta—was also suspended due to the shutdown of the CBS Broadcast Center. From late March through early August, the newscast was replaced by a straight simulcast of a newscast produced by sister CBS station WBZ in Boston, with little effort to localize the program's content besides a news ticker, and weather segments produced from Detroit (which aired alongside those that were Boston-specific). This arrangement remained until August 11, when WUPA's newscast was taken over by CBS's Fort Worth station KTVT and returned to a local format.

On June 22, in concert with phase 2 of New York City's lifting of restrictions, CBS This Morning returned to its studio at the CBS Broadcast Center, with minimal staff and at least one anchor continuing to host remotely as a contingency. Fox News Channel's morning show Fox & Friends also resumed in-studio production, with social distancing enforced on-set.

=== Pandemic-related programs ===
As the pandemic's impact became widely felt, television news outlets began to increase their coverage of that impact at the local and national levels. Fox News Channel added more live rolling news blocks to its schedule (including an extension of Fox News @ Night to 1:00 a.m. ET nightly, and a new overnight block anchored by Trace Gallagher), while Fox Business ceased production of most of its prime-time programming. Fox Television Stations expanded Fox 10 News Now—a streaming news webcast operated by the news department of its Phoenix, Arizona station KSAZ-TV—into "CoronavirusNow", which used the resources of its stations, Fox News, and Fox Business. The format would serve as a soft relaunch of the stream into a national channel, "LiveNOW from Fox".

ABC replaced its daytime talk show Strahan, Sara, and Keke with Pandemic: What You Need to Know, a special weekday program produced by ABC News Live and hosted by Amy Robach. Due to the suspension of Jimmy Kimmel Live!, ABC temporarily returned its long-running late-night newsmagazine Nightline to its original 11:35 p.m. timeslot from March 17 through April 10, with a focus on in-depth coverage. After Jimmy Kimmel Live! returned in a half-hour format, Nightline moved to the 12:05 a.m. slot.

Although What You Need To Know was initially promoted as an interim replacement for Strahan, Sara, and Keke, the program would persist indefinitely. Several months later, it was quietly retitled GMA3: What You Need to Know (now branding it as a spin-off of ABC's morning show Good Morning America, as its predecessor had), expanded its scope to include other news topics unrelated to COVID-19, and added T. J. Holmes as a co-anchor in September. In July and August 2020, it was reported by Page Six and co-host Keke Palmer, respectively, that Strahan, Sara and Keke had been canceled by ABC, absent an official statement on the future of the program.

Most of NBC's owned-and-operated stations extended their local late-night newscasts to a full hour from March 16 to 27. NBC's Spanish sister network Telemundo pre-empted its late-night sports program Titulares y Más in favor of a new late-night Noticias Telemundo bulletin, Coronavirus: Un Pais en Alerta (Coronavirus: A Nation On Alert), along with temporarily extending its morning show Un Nuevo Día by 90 minutes, its midday newscast Noticias Telemundo Mediodía by an additional half-hour, and its afternoon newsmagazine Al Rojo Vivo by one hour, in place of telenovela repeats and unscripted entertainment programs normally shown in some weekday daytime slots.

On April 26, 2020, Netflix premiered the first episode of Coronavirus, Explained, a special limited season of its documentary series Explained focusing on the pandemic. The first episode was produced in two and a half weeks, and featured interviews originally recorded for its 2019 episode "The Next Pandemic".

In This Together: A PBS American Portrait Story premiered on May 8, 2020, as part of a larger series based on viewer-submitted content.

=== Quarantines due to positive cases ===
Media organizations faced direct impact from the pandemic. Several correspondents were dignosed with coronavirus, including CBS News foreign correspondent Seth Doane (quarantined in Rome), ABC News correspondents Kaylee Hartung (quarantined in Los Angeles), as well as George Stephanopoulos (who contracted it asymptomatically from his wife Ali Wentworth while quarantined at home in New York City), and CNN anchors Chris Cuomo, Brooke Baldwin, and Richard Quest.

== Sports ==
=== Suspension of games ===
The suspension of nearly all major sports competitions, due to the pandemic, caused complications for broadcasters, as major events frequently have a large number of live viewers and high advertising revenue. The largest and most significant events also represent a major investment by broadcasters; in 2019, the total market for sports media rights in the United States was estimated at $22.42 billion, representing 44% of the international market. CBS Sports and Turner Sports pay $785 million per year to televise the NCAA Division I men's basketball tournament – whose 2020 edition was canceled only six days before it was scheduled to begin. In 2019, a 30-second commercial during the national championship game on CBS cost around $1.5 million, while CBS and Turner's contract to air the tournament accounts for nearly 72% of the NCAA's annual revenue.

At the time of the suspensions, the National Basketball Association (NBA) and National Hockey League (NHL) were also approaching their respective playoffs, Major League Soccer (MLS) was already two weeks into its regular season, Major League Baseball (MLB) was approaching the start of its regular season, CBS Sports was approaching its spring events such as the Masters Tournament, and NBC Sports was also approaching its spring lineup (promoted as the NBC Sports Championship Season), including the Kentucky Derby, Indianapolis 500, French Open, and the NHL's Stanley Cup Playoffs—all postponed due to the pandemic. Analysts felt that a postponement or cancellation of the 2020 Summer Olympics would have a major impact on NBCUniversal, due to the extensive rights fees it had paid to televise them, its large advertising inventory (NBC already announced that it had sold $1.2 billion in advertising for the Games), as well as the extensive use of NBCUniversal's various properties to promote the Olympics. NBC was expected to use the Games to bolster the July launch of its new streaming video platform Peacock. On March 24, it was announced that the Games would be postponed to 2021.

Sports-oriented cable networks revised their schedules due to the lack of live programming. They relied on reruns of classic events, and other original programming, in addition to cutting down on studio programming due to the lack of sports news to discuss beyond the pandemic's impact. One example of past televised events being re-aired was ESPN airing classic finals of the Scripps National Spelling Bee on April 12, 2020, following the suspension and later cancellation of the 2020 competition. An exception was the National Football League (NFL), whose 2019 season had already concluded in early February. The pandemic's surge in North America roughly coincided with the beginning of off-season business such as the free agency period, and the lead-up to the 2020 NFL draft, which went on as scheduled, but with no public festivities, and which was conducted remotely.

ESPN acquired reruns of several recent editions of WWE's WrestleMania events as part of the lead-up to WrestleMania 36, which had also been impacted by the pandemic; and ESPN2 organized an early reprisal of its annual "ESPN8" stunt (inspired by the depiction of a fictitious, eighth ESPN channel in the film DodgeBall: A True Underdog Story, which airs competitions that are "almost a sport") on March 22, followed by a May 2 edition on the main ESPN network (headlined by a deadlift world record attempt by strongman and Game of Thrones actor Hafþór Júlíus Björnsson).

Regional sports networks (RSNs) were also impacted; the sale of regional broadcast rights serves as a key source of revenue for many sports franchises. During the suspension of play, leagues granted RSNs easier access to archive content to help fill schedules; and some networks scheduled encores of games against opponents that their respective teams would have played if the season had continued as normal.

=== Modified programming ===
==== Professional wrestling ====
One of the few forms of sports-oriented programming in the United States to continue regular broadcasts during pandemic-related lockdowns was professional wrestling. WWE suspended in-arena broadcasts of its weekly shows Raw (USA Network) and SmackDown (Fox) on March 13, and moved them to a closed studio at its WWE Performance Center training facility in Orlando, with no audience and only essential staff present. WWE's flagship pay-per-view WrestleMania 36, originally scheduled for Raymond James Stadium in Tampa, took place under the same conditions (with two "cinematic" matches filmed at a second Orlando location, and WWE's Stamford headquarters, respectively). From the lead-up to WrestleMania through April 10 (and including WrestleMania itself), WWE used a pre-recorded format for its programs, before switching back to live shows on April 13. WWE NXT also returned to live broadcasts under similar conditions, from its usual home at Full Sail University in the Orlando suburb of Winter Park. Matches originally intended for NXT TakeOver: Tampa Bay—a canceled WWE Network special that was meant to serve as a support event for WrestleMania—were retooled for airing as NXT episodes in April.

The government of Florida issued an exemption to the state stay-at-home order on April 9, for staff of a "professional sports and media production" produced behind closed doors for a national audience. Mayor Jerry Demings, of Orange County, Florida, stated that the exemption was primarily intended for WWE, while Governor Ron DeSantis did not rule out its use by other sports bodies. All subsequent WWE pay-per-views until August 2020 were broadcast live from the Performance Center, and continued to include occasional pre-filmed and "cinematic" matches, including Money in the Bank (May, featuring a revamped version of its eponymous Money in the Bank matches taking place within WWE's Stamford headquarters), Backlash (June, featuring a pre-recorded "Greatest Wrestling Match Ever" between Edge and Randy Orton, with new production techniques, simulated crowd noise, and other homages to WWE in the 1980s), and Extreme Rules (July, featuring a "swamp fight" match filmed at an outside location).

All Elite Wrestling (AEW) similarly moved its weekly Dynamite to the Daily's Place amphitheater in Jacksonville on March 18 for two more weeks of television. While closed to the public, other performers were present on the sidelines as an audience. On March 31, the show moved to One Fall Power Factory, a wrestling training school in Norcross, Georgia, owned by AEW producer Q. T. Marshall, for three days of taping, where the promotion recorded content for AEW's Road to Double or Nothing episodes of Dynamite. AEW returned to Daily's Place on May 6 for Dynamite episodes (some tape days featured two shows taped, typically over one or two days), and moved the Double or Nothing pay-per-view on May 23 from its original venue, the MGM Grand Garden Arena in Las Vegas, and also used neighboring TIAA Bank Field for a "Stadium Stampede" match. WWE began to add NXT talent and other Performance Center trainees as an on-set audience, beginning with the May 25 Raw. They were spaced apart and behind glass panes.

On August 12, AEW invited 150 friends, family, and selected fans to attend a Dynamite taping, in an experiment to test changes for a return to ticketed events. On August 20, AEW announced that it would begin to sell a limited number of tickets for in-person spectators at Daily's Place, restricted to 10-15% capacity, or 750, beginning with the August 27 Dynamite. Beginning with the August 21 SmackDown, WWE moved its main weekly shows and pay-per-views (beginning with SummerSlam two nights later) from the Performance Center to Amway Center with a larger-scale production (branded as the "WWE ThunderDome") and a virtual audience.

In October, NXT and 205 Live moved from Full Sail and the ThunderDome to the Performance Center, in a remodeled main arena referred to as the "Capitol Wrestling Center" (an homage to the Capitol Wrestling Corporation, a precursor to the present-day WWE), beginning with the NXT TakeOver 31 pay-per-view. It initially featured a virtual audience similar to the ThunderDome, as well as limited in-person attendance (friends and family, as well as some outside spectators; they were divided using glass panes decorated with chain-link fencing). It was reported that the change was due to logistical conflicts with Full Sail that prevented WWE from continuing production at the university.

As it was unlikely that California public health orders would be sufficiently eased in time for the event, and as compensation for last year's re-location, WWE announced in January 2021 that WrestleMania 37 would be moved from SoFi Stadium in Inglewood (which was given WrestleMania 39 in 2023 instead) to Raymond James Stadium. WWE also confirmed plans to have in-person attendees at a reduced capacity, making it its first event to do so since March 2020. Due to its cancellations of live, ticketed events, WWE had a 9% year-over-year decline in revenue between the first quarters of 2020 and 2021, which would be partially offset by lower operating costs, and an agreement with NBCUniversal's streaming service Peacock to be the exclusive U.S. distributor of WWE Network content.

In November 2020, the AEW PPV Full Gear expanded the capacity of Daily's Place to 1,000 spectators. For their next pay-per-view event in March 2021, Revolution was allowed 1,300 spectators. Blood and Guts on May 5, 2021, drew 1,600 spectators, and by the end of the month, AEW expanded its Daily's Place shows to full capacity beginning with its pay-per-view Double or Nothing.

On May 21, 2021, WWE announced that it would return to in-person touring shows in July, beginning with the July 16, 2021, SmackDown from Toyota Center in Houston, followed by the Money in the Bank pay-per-view at Dickies Arena in Fort Worth on July 18, and Raw the following night from American Airlines Center in Dallas. On June 11, AEW announced that it would return to touring shows with a "Welcome Back Tour" of special Dynamite episodes, beginning with Road Rager at the Knight Center Complex in Miami on July 7. Beginning with NXT TakeOver: In Your House on June 13, NXT greatly expanded its audience in the CWC studio and lifted its mask requirements.

==== Resumption of live sports ====
With the gradual resumption of live sporting events, broadcasters took steps to reduce the number of staff members present on-site. Production teams on-site were separated into smaller units for social distancing reasons, while the remote integration model (REMI, which had been adopted by some sports broadcasts even before the pandemic) and remote commentators were employed by many broadcasters to decentralize all or part of a telecast at their production facilities and other outside locations.

To reduce on-site staff during the 2020 Major League Baseball season, the home team's local broadcaster was responsible for producing a neutral host video feed to be used by each broadcaster carrying the game (including the away team's broadcaster and/or a national broadcaster, such as Fox or ESPN, where applicable), which augmented it with commentary and surrounding coverage. MLB commentators did not travel to their teams' away games, but could broadcast home games on-site at their discretion.

With the NBA and NHL adopting a centralized "hub" approach to complete their 2019–20 seasons, both leagues employed a similar model with host feeds produced by their national broadcast partners (ESPN and TNT for the NBA, and NBC and Canadian broadcaster Sportsnet for the NHL). The broadcasters had selected on-air personnel within the "bubbles", but the majority of NBC's commentators worked games remotely during the early rounds of the 2020 Stanley Cup playoffs. Both leagues were also experimenting with new types of camera angles that would not be possible in an arena with spectators present. The NHL adopted a nearly identical neutral feed model to MLB for its 2020–21 season, although NBC still sent its crew for exclusive broadcasts.

To compensate for the lack of crowd due to games being held behind closed doors, some broadcasters employed simulated crowd sounds sourced from their league's official video games, with the NHL combining them with recordings of team-specific chants contributed by fans, and the NBA using video boards erected on its courts at ESPN Wide World of Sports Complex to display mosaics of remote fans powered by Microsoft Teams videoconferencing. Fox experimented with the use of "virtual", CGI fans to mask empty stands on its baseball broadcasts. By contrast, ESPN intentionally eschewed simulated crowd noise for its broadcasts of the MLS is Back Tournament, instead leveraging the lack of crowd and additional in-field microphones to provide enhanced in-game audio. The grandstand was masked by a chroma key wall, used primarily to display sponsor logos. WWE introduced a similarly styled "ThunderDome" staging at Orlando's Amway Center in August 2020 in time for its SummerSlam pay-per-view, also using a virtual audience.

Despite many restrictions having been lifted over 2021 and 2022, some regional sports networks retained a remote production model and commentary to varying extents due to budgetary concerns and other factors:

- The Baltimore Orioles and Washington Nationals' MASN continued to have its commentators broadcast all away games remotely, although this decision was quickly reversed in late-April 2022, following criticism.
- The Boston Bruins and Red Sox's NESN began to phase in on-site road broadcasts in 2022, with Bruins broadcasts doing so near the end of the regular season, and most Red Sox away games scheduled for on-site broadcasts.
- NBC Sports Bay Area maintained remote broadcasts for San Francisco Giants away games that featured their main broadcast team of Duane Kuiper and Mike Krukow, as Krukow was no longer able to travel due to his inclusion body myositis. Prior to COVID-19, the network had planned to have Krukow call selected games remotely, with Kuiper still traveling to the game site; Shawn Estes and Javier López served as an alternate broadcast team for all other Giants road games.
- Bally Sports West play-by-play announcer Matt Vasgersian called Los Angeles Angels games remotely from the MLB Network studios in Secaucus, New Jersey, to accommodate his day-to-day commitments to the network.
- ESPN televised the Australian Open remotely beginning in 2021, and continued to do so for 2023.

=== Alternative event programming ===
Sports broadcasters experimented with televised esports competitions, primarily involving sports video games and participants from their respective sports, such as the ENASCAR iRacing Pro Invitational Series (whose first event on March 22 attracted 903,000 viewers on Fox Sports 1, making it the highest-rated esports broadcast on U.S. linear television). A subsequent event simulcast the following week on Fox surpassed it with 1.339 million viewers. A seven-week tournament that followed the original NASCAR Cup Series schedule (including taking the Easter week off), ended May 9, 2020, with a race on a recreation of historic NASCAR venue North Wilkesboro Speedway, in lieu of the Blue-Emu Maximum Pain Relief 500 at Martinsville Speedway (which had been rescheduled for June 10), before the return of in-person Cup Series competition with The Real Heroes 400 at Darlington Raceway. The series was renewed for a second season in January 2021, as a five-week Wednesday night series with five weeks each half, and primarily promoting changes on the 2021 NASCAR schedule. In the 2023 NASCAR season, two of the virtual races were run in real life; the All-Star Race was held at a refurbished North Wilkesboro Speedway, which had been the subject of the May 2020 virtual event, and the Grant Park 220 was held on the Chicago street course designed in the 2021 virtual event. The IndyCar Series and NBC Sports introduced a similar invitational series, while ESPN and the NBA organized an NBA 2K Players Tournament, and Major League Soccer partnered with Fox to hold a televised FIFA 20 tournament, featuring MLS players and professional FIFA 20 players from the game's esports circuit. In professional esports, ESPN2 would simulcast matches from the 2020 League of Legends Championship Series Spring playoffs.

ESPN organized a televised H-O-R-S-E competition, featuring NBA and WNBA players competing via remote feeds from their personal courts. On May 4, 2020, ESPN announced that it had reached a deal for exclusive U.S. rights to KBO League baseball from South Korea for the 2020 KBO League season, using ESPN Major League Baseball personalities. Another major exception to the lack of live sports programming was thoroughbred racing at selected tracks; Fox Sports 1 simulcast the New York Racing Association's America's Day at The Races, while NBCSN partnered with TVG Network to simulcast its Trackside Live program on weekend afternoons. TVG itself switched to remote production, and on-air personalities began incorporating explanations of technical terminology to accommodate new viewers.

== Impact on the broadcasting industry ==
Implementations of mitigations such as stay-at-home orders led to a major increase in the usage of streaming services. Two more major streaming services—HBO Max (WarnerMedia) and Peacock (NBCUniversal) launched following the arrival of the pandemic, which contributed to the diffusion of content among multiple providers. In June 2020, Deloitte found in a survey that there was a growing "fatigue" over the number of competing streaming services, and that this and economic issues brought upon by the pandemic led to increased churn, customers limiting the number of services they subscribe to at once, and growth in advertising-supported (either free or low-cost) streaming platforms.

The pandemic also accelerated the market trend of cord cutting, the practice of reducing the use of traditional multichannel television services in favor of streaming services.

Due to the suspension of production of launch programming, Discovery Inc. delayed its planned re-launch of DIY Network as Magnolia Network (a joint venture with Chip and Joanna Gaines of the HGTV series Fixer Upper) from October 4, 2020, to an unspecified date in 2021, with previews of its launch programming being available on its new streaming service Discovery+ in January 2021. On February 11, 2021, Discovery announced that Magnolia's linear launch had been delayed to January 2022, and that it planned a wider streaming launch of its programming slate via Discovery+ and the Magnolia Network app on July 15, 2021.

=== On sports networks ===
Sports channels typically demand the highest per-subscriber carriage fees of any cable networks in the country. There were calls for broadcasters to compensate television providers for the lack of live events during lockdowns that these fees typically cover; New York Attorney General Letitia James stated that it was "grossly unfair that cable and satellite television providers would continue to charge fees for services they are not even providing".

In 2019, Sinclair Broadcast Group and Entertainment Studios (as Diamond Sports Group) acquired the RSN chain Fox Sports Networks for $9.6 billion, a transaction mandated as part of Disney's acquisition of 21st Century Fox. At the time, the group held regional rights to 42 professional teams across the country, and voluminous high school and college sports rights. Sinclair is also a joint venture partner with the Chicago Cubs in the team's new Marquee Sports Network. Concerns were raised that Diamond Sports' investment in the networks was vulnerable due to the lack of live programming, with an analyst stating that Diamond "may be heading for a liquidity crisis even sooner than we anticipated", as carriage negotiations with major providers may be more difficult without live events. Sinclair took a $4.23 billion write-down on the purchase in November 2020. Diamond Sports Group ultimately filed for chapter 11 bankruptcy in March 2023, emerging in January 2025 as Main Street Sports Group. However, the following year, the company began to experience further financial difficulties, while an offer to sell the company to British sports streaming service DAZN fell through. Main Street began to wind down its operations in early-2026, losing its rights to the nine remaining MLB teams it broadcast, and expecting to shut down entirely after the conclusion of the current NBA and NHL seasons.

In June 2020, citing the ending of its carriage agreements, the cancellation of NCAA tournaments, and uncertainties, ESPN announced that it would discontinue ESPN Goal Line/Bases Loaded, a part-time ESPN channel that carried rolling coverage of highlights and look-ins from regular-season college football games, and the NCAA baseball and softball tournaments. When ESPN instituted a similar channel for coverage of the MLB Wild Card Series games, such coverage was delegated to subscription service ESPN+.

On December 31, 2021, NBCUniversal discontinued its cable sports channel NBCSN, and moved its remaining sports properties to USA Network, Peacock, and Olympic Channel. While a memo revealing the decision earlier in the year did not specifically mention the pandemic as a contributing factor, NBC Sports was dealing with the impacts of the delayed 2020 Summer Olympics on revenue, among other postponed or cancelled events.

== Award shows ==
Several award shows were also postponed or reformatted as virtual events, since they were considered to be large gatherings that were subjected to government public health restrictions, including the 2020 iHeartRadio Music Awards (originally to be held March 29 in Los Angeles and aired by Fox, its ceremony was canceled on August 24, with winners announced throughout the Labor Day weekend on iHeartMedia radio stations instead of a televised ceremony), the 2020 Nickelodeon Kids' Choice Awards (originally to be held on March 22 in Inglewood, California and rescheduled for May 2 in a remote format), the 55th Academy of Country Music Awards (originally to be held April 5 and aired by CBS, but rescheduled for September 16), and the 2020 Billboard Music Awards (originally to be held on April 29, but rescheduled to October 14). The 74th Tony Awards (originally to be held on June 7 at Radio City Music Hall and aired by CBS) were postponed indefinitely, due largely to mandated closures of Broadway theaters in New York. CBS aired a "sing-along" version of Grease as a CBS Sunday Night Movie in place of the ceremony.

The 47th Daytime Emmy Awards canceled its in-person ceremonies, which had originally been scheduled in a new three-night format. On April 28, the NATAS announced that the presentation would be rescheduled as a virtual event, and announced on May 20 that the winners in leading categories would be presented in a CBS special on June 26—which marked the return of the Daytime Emmys to television in any form (after having been streamed online) for the first time since 2015, and its return to network television for the first time since 2011.

On May 1, the Television Critics Association canceled their summer 2020 press tour, originally scheduled for July 28 through August 13, including the TCA Awards. The organization was unsure the tour could occur at all due to public gathering restrictions, and there was an anticipated lack of any new scripted or unscripted programming output, even in pilot form, to promote.

The 2020 MTV Video Music Awards canceled its in-person ceremonies (scrapping plans to hold a less-crowded ceremony at Barclays Center); the ceremony was produced in a "virtual" format, with most performances filmed at various locations in the New York Cit area, and selected acts filmed in either Los Angeles or—in the case of BTS—South Korea—if they were unable to travel to New York. New one-off award categories for best home-filmed music videos, "quarantine performances", and music performances by first responders were also added. Its companion, the MTV Movie & TV Awards, never announced nominations or an airdate. On November 11, MTV announced that it would instead air a retrospective special, MTV Movie & TV Awards: Greatest of All Time, and aim to air, in late 2021, a larger ceremony encompassing 2019 through 2021. The network later announced that the 2021 MTV Movie & TV Awards would be held in May 2021 over two nights, with the second devoted exclusively to non-scripted television. After two years of in-person ceremonies, the 2023 MTV Movie & TV Awards pivoted to a pre-recorded virtual event for different reasons, after its planned host and guests dropped out in solidarity to the 2023 Writers Guild of America strike. Variety remarked that the reformatted ceremony "ran a lot like a COVID-era awards show".

The 55th Academy of Country Music Awards was moved to Nashville, with performances and award presentations divided between the Bluebird Café, the Grand Ole Opry House, and the Ryman Auditorium. The 56th ceremony in 2021 followed a similar format, albeit with healthcare workers as guests on the balconies at the Ryman and the Opry.

The 72nd Primetime Emmy Awards were produced as a virtual event from Staples Center (now Crypto.com Arena) in Los Angeles, with host Jimmy Kimmel and award presenters appearing on a stage at the arena, and all nominees appearing via remote feeds from various locations. Kimmel acknowledged the circumstances in his opening monologue, which featured stock footage of audiences from past Primetime Emmy ceremonies, culminating with footage that showed Kimmel himself as an audience member.

The 54th Annual Country Music Association Awards were held on November 11, 2020, in Nashville's Music City Center. The ceremony only allowed the nominees, their staff, guests, and the crew into the venue with the traditional red carpet not taking place. The show would incorporate live and pre-recorded performances (with around 60% being performed live) and multiple stages throughout the venue were utilized to account for how each stage must be fully cleaned and sanitized by crew members following a performance, taking about fifteen to twenty minutes. Seating arrangements for the attendees were designed to strictly adhere to social distancing guidelines, with a banquet-style layout akin to the inaugural untelevised CMA Awards wherein an artist and their guests have their own table spaced eight meters apart from the other tables.

On January 5, 2021, the 63rd Annual Grammy Awards were postponed from January 31 to March 14 due to the COVID-19 situation in Los Angeles. The ceremony featured a mix of live and pre-recorded segments and was filmed without an audience at the Los Angeles Convention Center. It used five different stages in a circular arrangement, which producer Ben Winston stated was inspired by the British series Later... with Jools Holland.

The 93rd Academy Awards were postponed from February to April due to the impact of the pandemic on the film industry; the ceremony was re-located to Union Station's historic ticket hall, with a limited number of participants in the hall at any one time, and some appearing remotely from other locations. The 78th Golden Globe Awards, also postponed, took the Oscars' original date, and featured in-person attendance at both its traditional home of The Beverly Hilton in Los Angeles, and New York's Rainbow Room (with Tina Fey and Amy Poehler co-hosting from the two locations respectively), and some participants appearing remotely.

On May 26, 2021, it was announced that the 74th Tony Awards would be held on September 26, 2021, with the Winter Garden Theatre announced as the venue that August. The CBS primetime broadcast was retooled as a two-hour concert special paying tribute to the reopening of Broadway shows, along with the presentations for the top awards of Best Musical, Best Revival of a Play, and Best Play. The rest of the individual award presentations were held during a two-hour pre-show that streamed on Paramount+.

The 73rd Primetime Emmy Awards were initially to take place inside the Microsoft Theater at L.A. Live. However, due to concerns over the Delta variant, CBS and the Academy announced that the ceremony would be held at the Event Deck, a hybrid indoor-outdoor venue within the L.A. Live complex. The ceremony was largely held inside a tent with upwards of 800 people inside; presenter Seth Rogen jokingly commented on-air that "they said this would be outdoors. It's not. We're in a hermetically sealed tent. They lied to us." Host Cedric the Entertainer later noted that all attendees were required to be fully vaccinated to attend, and that "I did not have a reaction like Nicki Minaj's cousin's friend." The ceremony was produced under Los Angeles regulations for film and television productions.

In December 2021, the 27th Critics' Choice Awards were postponed due to the widespread surge of the Omicron variant in the United States, and were later rescheduled to March 13, 2022, the same day as the 75th British Academy Film Awards, with the ceremony split between venues in Los Angeles and London. The following month, the 64th Grammy Awards were postponed from their initial January 31, 2022, date to April 3 of that year due to similar concerns over Omicron variant, and also moved from Crypto.com Arena to the MGM Grand Garden Arena in Las Vegas due to scheduling conflicts. The 94th Academy Awards returned to its usual home of the Dolby Theatre, with proof of vaccination requirements for attendees (but not presenters and performers), and the main seating area arranged for social distancing using seats and tables.

== Beauty pageants ==
Several beauty pageants were postponed, including Miss USA 2020, which was originally scheduled in spring 2020 and planned to be broadcast on Fox but was postponed indefinitely. On August 31, 2020, it was announced that the pageant would be rescheduled for November 9, moved to the cable channel FYI, and to be held in Graceland in Memphis, Tennessee, with a socially distanced audience of 300 spectators.

Likewise, Miss Universe 2020 was originally scheduled for fall/winter 2020 and rescheduled for May 16, 2021, to be held in Hollywood, Florida, also at a socially distanced venue of Seminole Hard Rock Hotel & Casino Hollywood with a seated audience of 1,750, around 25 percent of the venue's seating capacity. That event was also aired on FYI; this was the only time FYI aired the event, when its regular broadcaster, Fox, could not due to uncertainties.

Miss USA 2021 had affected the scheduling of the state pageant season, which had normally been held from September 2020 to February 2021, and was now pushed to December 2020 and much of 2021, following the indefinite delay of Miss USA 2020. Some state pageants such as those for Alaska and Hawaii, were held behind closed doors as a private hotel reception. On April 20, 2021, it was announced the pageant would be held at River Spirit Casino and Hotel in Tulsa, Oklahoma, in November 2021. Sometime later in summer 2021, FYI would broadcast the pageant for the second year running.

The Miss America pageant had planned its 94th edition (known as Miss America 2021), which was originally scheduled for December 2020 but was cancelled on May 8, 2020. The Miss America Organization opted to postpone this edition a full year to 2021, and included a one-time-only grandfather clause regarding eligibility for state qualifying pageants that were due to have been scheduled between April and June 2020, where competitors who would have exceeded the age limit of 25 years were grandfathered in for the following year. In April 2021, the Miss America Organization announced the upcoming pageant was set for December 2021, to be held in Mohegan Sun.

== See also ==
- 2020 in American television
- COVID-19 pandemic in the United States
- Impact of the COVID-19 pandemic on television
