= South Park season 24 =

Season of television series

South Park
- Season 24
- Home media release cover
- No. of episodes: 2

Release
- Original network: Comedy Central
- Original release: September 30, 2020 – March 10, 2021

Season chronology
- ← Previous; Season 23 Next → Season 25

The twenty-fourth season of the American animated sitcom South Park is the shortest season of the series, consisting of two extended-length episodes: "The Pandemic Special" and "South ParQ Vaccination Special". The production of the season and the topics of both episodes were shaped by the COVID-19 pandemic.

While broadcast rights have remained with Comedy Central, this is the first season where the exclusive streaming rights have been held by HBO Max.

== Production ==
On August 5, 2021, Comedy Central announced that Trey Parker and Matt Stone had signed a $900 million deal for extending the series to 30 seasons through 2027 and 14 feature films, exclusive to the Paramount+ streaming platform owned and operated by Comedy Central's parent company, ViacomCBS. Two films were confirmed to be released at the end of 2021. Parker and Stone later clarified that the projects were television films, and that it was ViacomCBS who decided to advertise them as feature films. Paramount+ promotes the productions as "exclusive events", and subsequent trade publications have identified the productions as television specials.

== Episodes ==
South Park, season 24 episodes
No. overall	No. in season	Title	Directed by	Written by	Original release date	Prod. code	U.S. viewers (millions)
308	1	"The Pandemic Special"	Trey Parker	Trey Parker	September 30, 2020	2401	2.27
Randy comes to terms with his role in the COVID-19 outbreak as the ongoing pandemic continues to challenge the citizens of South Park.
309	2	"South ParQ Vaccination Special"	Trey Parker	Trey Parker	March 10, 2021	2402	1.74
The citizens of South Park are clamoring for the COVID-19 vaccine. A new militant group tries to stop the boys from getting their teacher vaccinated.

== Reception ==
On Rotten Tomatoes, the season holds a 63% approval rating based on eight reviews; the site editors characterize five as positive and three as negative.

== Home media ==
The season was released on Blu-ray and DVD on August 16, 2022. A home media release containing "South Park: Post COVID" and "South Park: Post COVID: The Return of COVID" was issued on December 6, 2022.

== See also ==
- South Park (Park County, Colorado)
- South Park City
