= South Park: The Streaming Wars =

2022 American television special

- South Park episode
- Release poster
- Directed by: Trey Parker
- Written by: Trey Parker
- Original air date: June 1, 2022
- Running time: 50 minutes

Episode chronology
← Previous "Credigree Weed St. Patrick's Day Special"	Next → "South Park: The Streaming Wars Part 2"

"South Park: The Streaming Wars" (Note: Also titled "South Park: The Streaming Wars Part 1") is a 2022 American adult animated comedy television special episode written and directed by Trey Parker. It is the third South Park television special produced for Paramount+ and was released on June 1, 2022. It also serves as the 318th overall episode of the television series.

== Plot ==
Denver is experiencing a large drought caused by ManBearPig, resulting in drying streams and discussions about reinstituting watering restrictions. The protesting citizens, including waterpark owner Pi Pi, are told that the city's water sees use in agriculture.

In South Park, Stan Marsh and Tolkien Black are concerned about the former's father, Randy, who is derisively referred to as "Karen". Randy and Steve Black's arguing is interrupted by a Denver water commissioner examining the water supplies at their respective farms. Meanwhile, Eric Cartman is despondent over residing in the abandoned hot dog stand. He is intrigued when he notices construction on a house across the street for golf course owner Talnua Cussler. Cartman suggests to his mother, Liane, that she get breast implants to attract Cussler, but Liane refuses. When Cartman says he doesn't want to continue living like this, Liane points out that he is the one who made her quit her job. Ignoring his fault, she informs Cartman that the surgery costs $10,000.

Steve learns that he can sell some of his water supply if the stream reaches Denver's reservoir. At Stan and Tolkien's suggestion, they craft a small boat and send it downstream. The experiment is successful, and Steve begins accepting subscriptions to his streaming service, including Pi Pi. When Steve is told to send boats downstream daily, he pays Stan and Tolkien to increase their production. Randy becomes frustrated at Steve's success, so Stan and Tolkien agree to build him craft boats as well. They recruit Kyle Broflovski, Kenny McCormick and Butters Stotch to help them as demand increases; they initially refuse to recruit Cartman, but relent when Cartman tells them his mom needs surgery (leaving out the crucial detail of the type of surgery). Cussler offers Stan and Tolkien $15,000 for 10,000 boats, thus covering the surgery's cost. Cartman tries to surprise Liane with the surgery, but she stands by her earlier decision, as making her quit her job was the last straw, and no longer giving in to his demands. He threatens to have the surgery done to himself, but Liane remains unfazed, allowing the surgery to proceed.

When Steve sees a report about ManBearPig's environmental damage, he hikes up the mountains to see for himself. He approaches a dying real estate agent, who tells Steve that a large swath of land near the streams has been sold to a wealthy buyer. When Randy sails one of his boats downstream, it is sunk by Cussler Industries boats. Randy confronts Stan about Cussler's boats and demands that he end their deal. When they visit Cussler's house, they find that he was killed by ManBearPig, and Randy wonders if Stan is in danger. At Pi Pi's Splashtown, Steve tells Pi Pi that he will have to cancel the waterpark's streaming rights to provide water to his farm. Pi Pi refuses, revealing that he is collaborating with the water commissioner and ManBearPig. Steve realizes that Pi Pi purchased the land in the mountains when ManBearPig attacks, stabbing Steve and throwing him out a window down a water slide. Pi Pi later reveals to the water commissioner his plan to replace all of Denver's water with his park's urine-contaminated water. He betrays the commissioner and has ManBearPig attack him in a similar fashion to Steve.

At school, Stan warns the others of Cussler's death when Cartman arrives with his breast implants. Tolkien's mother, Linda, calls him to inform him of Steve's disappearance. The people of Denver waste their water supply as the reservoir is slowly draining, while Randy investigates Cussler and the commissioner's histories.

== Cast ==
- Trey Parker
- Matt Stone
- April Stewart
- Kimberly Brooks
- Adrien Beard
- Vernon Chatman

== Production ==
On August 5, 2021, Comedy Central announced that Parker and Stone had signed a $900 million deal for extending the series to 30 seasons through 2027 and 14 feature-length films, exclusive to Paramount+. It was eventually confirmed that they would be rolled out as two "events" per year. Parker and Stone would later state that the projects would not be feature films, and that it was ViacomCBS who decided to advertise them as movies. Subsequent advertising and branding has indicated that these are more properly classified as television specials.

"The Streaming Wars"' release date and synopsis was released on May 11, 2022.

== Reception ==
John Schwarz of Bubbleblabber rated the episode a 9 out of 10, stating that the episode "continues to showcase the franchise creators' advanced forward thinking that seems to just be far beyond reach of what we deem reality". Schwarz also compared the episode to the episode "Dead Kids", stating it "also features a litany of hilarious gags that, like 'Dead Kids', help you forget the seriousness of the matter at hand, but the signs are still all there."

Kayla Cobb of Decider noted in her recap that the ongoing references of the water streams from the various farms was a reference to the abundance of streaming services. As Cobb recapped a speech given by Butters about the state of streaming services, she commented "It's unknown if the monologue is something (Matt) Stone and (Trey) Parker have personally experienced or if they're reading the industry room, so to speak. For example, we don't know if Paramount's reshuffling caused the company to lose a key player in one of South Park's deals or if there have been creative disputes between Stone, Parker, Paramount+, and this Paramount Global-owned version of Viacom. However, it's rare for the duo to get this specific and longwinded unless they're personally infuriated. It just goes to show that even TV's $900 million men have no idea what's happening."

Spencer Legacy of Comingsoon.net rated the episode a 7 out of 10, and stated in the review the episode "juggles a few too many elements later on, as the introduction of ManBearPig in relation to streaming is seemingly random. There's probably an argument to make about streaming services contributing to climate change, but that's not a recent or major news story, so the connection seems odd. But even if the link is hazy at best, it's still quite funny to drag out that long-running bit." The website explains that the rating equates to "Good" and "A successful piece of entertainment that is worth checking out, but it may not appeal to everyone."

Cathal Gunning of Screen Rant wrote about the ending of the episode, and stated the ending "is a bleak one that will be familiar to fans of the classic film noir Chinatown. The evil Pi Pi ends up achieving all of his goals, with ManBearPig tearing down the dam holding Denver's water supply in reserve while the local citizens unknowingly waste their precious, limited water. The true meaning of the South Park special is that real-life companies are doing the same thing, with Pi Pi standing in for corporations profiting off water scarcity while ManBearPig acts as an allegory for climate change."

== See also ==
- South Park (Park County, Colorado)
- South Park City
