= South Park: The Streaming Wars Part 2 =

2022 American television special

- South Park episode
- Release poster
- Directed by: Trey Parker
- Written by: Trey Parker
- Original air date: July 13, 2022
- Running time: 47 minutes

Episode chronology
← Previous "South Park: The Streaming Wars"	Next → "Cupid Ye"

"South Park: The Streaming Wars Part 2" is a 2022 American adult animated comedy television special episode written and directed by Trey Parker. It is the fourth South Park television special and 319th overall episode of the television series, and was released on Paramount+ on July 13, 2022. It concludes the storyline that began in its predecessor, "South Park: The Streaming Wars".

== Plot ==
Amidst the streaming wars, the drought in South Park has significantly worsened. In court, Eric Cartman sues his mother Liane, forcing Stan Marsh, Tolkien Black, Butters Stotch and Kyle Broflovski to testify about how Cartman used the money they earned to pay for his breast implants; the case is ultimately dismissed. Elsewhere, Randy Marsh wakes up on a bench, surrounded by fearful onlookers. Police tranquilize Randy and transport him to the hospital, where Detective Harris explains that Randy went "full nuclear Karen". Meanwhile, Tolkien searches the late Robert Cussler's abandoned home for clues about his missing father, Steve. When he tells Cartman of Cussler's death, Cartman surmises that Tolkien is having sex with Liane, believing it to be why she is standing up to Cartman.

At a Denver city council meeting, Pi Pi proposes his pitch deck to have his water park, and subsequently the entirety of Colorado, run entirely on urine. His service is endorsed by celebrities who promoted cryptocurrency and NFTs. Meanwhile, a remorseful Randy abandons his marijuana farming business and resumes his geology profession, searching for a solution to the drought. As Denver is about to commission Pi Pi's service, Randy arrives and proposes building a desalination plant, which Denver accepts. Enraged, Pi Pi orders his staff, including ManBearPig, to get rid of Randy. Cartman and Butters spy on Tolkien at his house; when Tolkien confronts them, Cartman reveals his research on the drought. Cartman, Butters and Tolkien tell Harris of their research; Harris, believing that Steve is behind the drought, reveals that ManBearPig is likely being exploited as it fears for its mate, PigBearGirl; and their offspring, Chuck Chuck. When Harris reveals a photo of Steve at the water park, the boys realize he must be there. Steve regains consciousness in a sewer; noticing his patched-up wound, he realizes that PigBearGirl and Chuck Chuck tended to him.

Construction of the desalination plant begins as Randy realizes that there will be an issue transporting saltwater uphill to the plant. As Cartman, Butters and Tolkien survey the waterpark, they locate an employee entrance near the water slide seen in Harris' photo. Inside, they discover Chuck Chuck before being trapped by security. Pi Pi tells the boys his plans to have everyone invest in his urine service and eliminate the boys. Harris visits Linda Black at Credigree Weed, revealing his intent to kill Steve if he finds him, while Steve eavesdrops on their conversation. Randy receives a call from his coworkers that ManBearPig, referred to as "climate change," has destroyed the plant, presumably in search of Randy. Steve finds Randy and tells him of Pi Pi's plan. Randy's family convinces him to revert to his Karen persona, using a strain of marijuana Sharon had saved.

As Pi Pi films his latest commercial, Randy, as Karen, forces his way into the waterpark and reveals Pi Pi's plan to everyone present. The distraction allows the kids to escape with the help of Chuck Chuck and PigBearGirl. Tolkien and ManBearPig are reunited with their respective families. Now free from Pi Pi's control, ManBearPig decapitates him. Randy convinces Cartman and other women with breast implants to drain their saline implants and power the desalination plant. The plant restores water to the Denver area as ManBearPig and his family return to the woods. When Linda suggests that Chuck Chuck should be killed before he ends up like his father, Stan instead suggests that the people reach out to him, but Randy dismisses this, inviting everyone to simply smoke some marijuana.

== Cast ==
- Trey Parker
- Matt Stone
- April Stewart
- Adrien Beard
- Kimberly Brooks
- Neyla Cantu
- Betty Boogie Parker

== Development ==
On August 5, 2021, Comedy Central announced that Parker and Stone had signed a $900 million deal for extending the series to 30 seasons through 2027 and 14 feature films, exclusive to the Paramount+ streaming platform. It was eventually confirmed that they would be rolled out as two films per year. Parker and Stone would later state that the projects would not be feature films, and that it was ViacomCBS who decided to advertise them as movies. Subsequent advertising and branding has indicated that these are more properly classified as television specials.

"Streaming Wars Part 2" was announced with its release date and synopsis on June 29, 2022.

== Reception ==
Spencer Legacy with Comingsoon.net rated the episode a 9 out of 10, which the site equates to "Excellent", and stated in the summary of his review that the episode "is a strong step up from the first part, featuring a mix of both sharp commentary and stupid yet hilarious gags. Randy had a neat arc that old-school fans will appreciate, and no celebrity was spared from South Park's hilarious wrath. Whether we get another special or season 26 next, the show is in a good spot, ripe with opportunities for silly stories and topical jabs. Even if you didn't dig the first part of The Streaming Wars, I recommend checking out Part 2, as it's a fun burst of classic South Park comedy."

David Pierce with The Verge particularly enjoyed the episode's roast of celebrities who have endorsed cryptocurrency and NFTs in commercials, stating "Matt Damon making that 'Fortune Favors The Brave' commercial for Crypto.com will go down in history as one of the best things that ever happened to South Park...The show has been making fun of crypto, Damon, and that phrase ever since. But with South Park The Streaming Wars Part 2, which just hit Paramount Plus, the show's crypto jokes hit a new level."

John Schwarz with Bubbleblabber.com rated the episode a 9 out of 10, which the site equates to "Awesome: Not quite perfect, but you should watch whatever this is even if you think you're not a fan of the franchise or are familiar with the subject matter", noting how he particularly enjoyed the releases of adult animation specials on Paramount+. He stated in his review: "In the last 45-days, Paramount+ has sandwiched two South Park movies with a new Beavis and Butt-Head movie in the meaty middle, making this the most fulfilling event-filled summer yet for adult animation. I don't know if more specials are hitting by the end of the summer as of this writing, but I'm loving this back and forth between Mike Judge and Matt/Trey as it's making both creative camps come forward with their best stuff. As stupid as it is that Cartman gets boobs in South Park The Streaming Wars Part One, it's equally as dumb for Beavis and Butt-head to be sent to space. South Park The Streaming Wars Part Two answers back with a piss-filled tour de force that will have people talking for weeks...just in time for Paramount+ to hit us with hopefully another adult animated comedy special of some kind."

== See also ==
- South Park (Park County, Colorado)
- South Park City
