= South Park: Post COVID =

- South Park episode
- Official release poster
- Directed by: Trey Parker
- Written by: Trey Parker
- Original air date: November 25, 2021
- Running time: 59 minutes

Episode chronology
← Previous "South ParQ Vaccination Special"	Next → "South Park: Post COVID: The Return of COVID"

"South Park: Post COVID" is a 2021 American adult animated comedy television film written and directed by Trey Parker. It is the first in a series of South Park television specials for the streaming service Paramount+ and premiered on November 25, 2021. It is also considered to be the 310th episode overall of the television series. Its story is followed by "The Return of COVID."

== Plot ==
Forty years into the future, the COVID-19 pandemic is waning. Stan Marsh has moved away from South Park, Colorado, is employed as an online whiskey consultant, and lives with a sentient, nagging Amazon Alexa. Stan receives a call from Kyle Broflovski, now the guidance counselor at South Park Elementary, who informs him that Kenny McCormick has died.

Working as a scientist, Kenny had been researching the origins of COVID-19 and the possibility of a cure. He revealed that in the event of his death, his closest friends would know where to find his missing data by retracing their steps. Stan returns to South Park to pay his respects to Kenny; he is reluctant to reconnect with Kyle and rebuffs his suggestion that they search for Kenny's missing data. They attend Kenny's wake and reunite with several of their former classmates. Eric Cartman has converted to Judaism, become a rabbi, and is raising a family, to Kyle's skeptical annoyance. Also in attendance are Tweek Tweak and his partner Craig Tucker; Wendy Testaburger and her husband, Darwin; Jimmy Valmer, who has become a late-night talk show host; Token Black, now a law enforcement officer; and Clyde Donovan. Stan leaves the wake early and watches a report on Kenny, where he notices "Tegridy Weed" in Kenny's notes.

At Kenny's funeral, a furious Stan believes that Kyle set him up to coerce him to visit his father, Randy. As Stan departs, a scientist confirms Kenny's cause of death to be a new COVID-19 variant, causing widespread panic. Military forces quarantine South Park as Stan attempts to leave, forcing him to take shelter at South Park Elementary. With the refuge at total capacity, a reluctant Kyle allows Cartman and his family to stay with him.

Stan eventually relents and visits Randy. It is revealed that following the pandemic, Randy's wife, Sharon, filed for divorce; however, Randy refused to relinquish his stake in Tegridy Farms, resulting in constant arguing. Frustrated, Stan burned down the farm, unaware that Randy had locked Stan's sister Shelley inside the barn as punishment for refusing to do her farm chores, resulting in her death. Distraught over Shelley's death, Sharon committed suicide, and Stan and Randy became estranged as each blamed the other for what had happened. They escape the nursing home to what is left of Tegridy Farms, where Randy admits his responsibility for the pandemic. Randy reveals that he had smuggled marijuana seeds in his rectum, prompting Stan to realize that Kenny did the same with his data.

In Stan and Kyle's absence, Token, Craig, Tweek, Wendy, Jimmy, and Clyde try searching for Kenny's data themselves. They attempt to contact Victor Chouce, Kenny's only surviving associate, but find he is institutionalized. Clyde refuses to be vaccinated, preventing the group from visiting the asylum. They discover Kenny's secret laboratory in the school and learn that he was attempting to perfect time travel to prevent the pandemic from happening.

Stan, Kyle, and Cartman visit the morgue and retrieve Kenny's flash drive from his rectum. They reunite with their friends at the school and discover a video of Kenny's time travel experiment on the drive, in which his colleague reveals that he faulted Stan, Kyle, and Cartman for letting the pandemic drive them apart, indirectly causing the dystopian future. Because Kenny was not wearing a mask, a malfunction killed all the scientists. Kenny briefly disappears, returning after having contracted COVID-19 in the process. Reflecting on their childhood, Stan and Kyle vow to finish Kenny's work. Cartman also volunteers at first, out of fear for his family. However, he flees with them, not wanting the future to be changed. Meanwhile, Randy finds a small sprout of marijuana and vows to protect it. At the asylum, it is revealed that "Chouce" is a mispronunciation of "Chaos".

== Cast ==
- Trey Parker
- Matt Stone
- April Stewart
- Mona Marshall
- Kimberly Brooks
- Adrien Beard
- Delilah Kujala
- Betty Boogie Parker

== Production ==
=== Development ===
On August 5, 2021, Comedy Central announced that Parker and Stone had signed a $900 million deal for extending the series to 30 seasons through 2027 and 14 feature films, exclusive to the Paramount+ streaming platform owned and operated by Comedy Central's parent company, ViacomCBS. Two of these new films were confirmed to be released at the end of 2021. Parker and Stone would later state that the projects would not be feature films, and that it was ViacomCBS who decided to advertise them as movies. Subsequent advertising and branding has indicated that these are more properly classified as television specials.

=== Working process ===
South Park Studios, the production company for the series, closed when the COVID-19 pandemic in the United States began in March 2020, forcing the crew to work remotely. Stone stated that the film is a made-for-TV film, and was not on a theatrical budget, an experiment he explained the production sought to continue, because "We're at where a lot of people are at, which is the future kind of sucks. We would like to get back to where each week we can do something totally different."

=== References to popular culture ===
The episode's depiction of the future as a dystopia overrun by consumerism, geisha video billboards and flying cars is a reference to Blade Runner. The special also has references to The Godfather Part II and Beverly Hills Cop.

== Reception ==
Liam Hoofe of Flickering Myth said of the episode "In the end, South Park: Post COVID feels like it is setting the table for a more interesting feature a little later down the road. The movie/TV special spends most of its runtime introducing us to the new world that the group now inhabits. It has some really nice satirical touches and a lot of the Covid-related jokes land well."

== See also ==
- South Park (Park County, Colorado)
- South Park City
