= South ParQ Vaccination Special =

- South Park episode
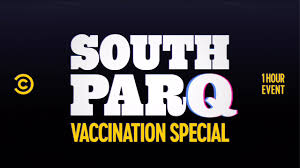
- Episode no.: Season 24; Episode 2
- Directed by: Trey Parker
- Written by: Trey Parker
- Production code: 2402
- Original air date: March 10, 2021
- Running time: 47 minutes (Note: Advertised in some countries as a one-hour special, which includes commercial breaks.)

Episode chronology
| ← Previous "The Pandemic Special" | Next → "South Park: Post COVID" |
- South Park season 24

"South ParQ Vaccination Special" is the second and final episode of the twenty-fourth season of the American animated television series South Park. (Note: Some sources, including Comedy Central's website, listed the episode as part of the twenty-fourth season, while others suggested that they were standalone specials. This conflict was resolved when Season 25 was officially announced.) The 309th episode overall of the series, it premiered on Comedy Central in the United States on March 10, 2021.

The episode centers on the efforts of South Park's citizens to receive the COVID-19 vaccine. Of particular focus is Stan Marsh, Kyle Broflovski and Eric Cartman, who find themselves reevaluating their strained friendship and the consequent toll it has on their friend Kenny McCormick. Meanwhile, former President Garrison returns to South Park, but is met with hostility by the populace; his only support comes from QAnon adherents opposing the people's vaccination efforts.

Critical reception to the episode was generally positive, with praise for its story, humor, and social commentary. It was one of the highest-rated South Park episodes in several years, premiering to 1.74 million viewers and reaching a total of 3.47 million viewers by the end of the night. It was the most-watched program of the night and as of March 2021, was at cable's number one telecast among young adults audiences of the year.

== Plot ==
Desperate for the COVID-19 vaccine, Mr. Mackey and Thomas Adler visit a Walgreens to find a long line outside. They and everyone else in line are denied entry, as only senior citizens are admitted. At school, Eric Cartman and Kenny McCormick play a prank on their teacher, Margaret Nelson, that involves her sitting on a packet of ketchup so that she appears to be menstruating. A humiliated Nelson quits when the prank is carried out, revealing that she has not been vaccinated.

Mr. Garrison, having finished his term as President, returns to South Park with his assistant, Mr. Service, to resume his profession as a teacher, being hired in Nelson's place. Many of the townspeople oppose Garrison's return; the White family are among Garrison's few supporters, and appeal to him about preventing vaccinations. Bob White interprets a dismissive remark by Garrison as a coded instruction to spread QAnon's conspiracy theories among children. Bob forms a private company, Tutornon, to indoctrinate the children, whose indignant parents hire them after withdrawing their children from Garrison's class.

Facing backlash over their prank, Cartman, Kenny, Stan Marsh, and Kyle Broflovski decide to make amends by obtaining vaccines for their teachers, under the pretense of forming the Kommunity Kidz. The boys gain entry to Walgreens by bribing an already-vaccinated elderly woman; upon being found out, they escape with a tray of vaccines, with several townspeople in pursuit. Cartman wants to sell the vaccines online, Stan wants the boys to take the vaccines themselves, and Kyle is pressured by his parents, Gerald and Sheila, to deliver some doses to them. The boys put aside their differences to deliver the vaccines to the school, but are impeded by the Lil' Qties, a group of children indoctrinated by their tutors. A fight ensues between the two groups, which is joined by members of QAnon and other townspeople wanting the vaccines.

Garrison confronts the White family, who tells him of QAnon and its conspiracy theories about the elite. Bob urges Garrison and Mr. Service to join him in opposing the elite. The three are inexplicably transported to a polar landscape, where Bob is toyed with by the elites. Garrison desperately calls out to the elites, pleading with them to return his life to normal; he is answered by Mr. Service's transformation into Mr. Hat. Meanwhile, Cartman, Stan, and Kyle start discussing a new plan to enter the school but are distracted into discussing increasingly elaborate schedule plans with Kenny, their friendship broken by mutual mistrust. Garrison returns and, having partnered with the elites, arranges for a plane to arrive with enough vaccines for everyone. Cartman, Stan, and Kyle finally enter the school with the teachers' vaccines. However, by that point, Nelson has contracted COVID-19 and dies from it. At her funeral, the townspeople celebrate being vaccinated, and life in South Park returns to normal, with Stan, Kyle, Cartman and Kenny moving on with their lives with each one of them dedicating time to Kenny.

== Release ==
The episode was simulcast on MTV2, and released on the South Park Studios website and Comedy Central digital and on-demand platforms. It became available on HBO Max in the United States on March 11, 2021.

== Reception ==
Alec Bojalad for Den of Geek gave the episode 4 out of 5 stars, writing that, "The South Park Vaccination Special is far superior to the Pandemic Special and is one of the better South Park episodes of the past few years." Bojalad praised the episode's focus on the children of South Park Elementary over the parents, though felt that the writers were not sure what to do with QAnon.

Ben Travers with IndieWire gave the episode a B grade, and closed his review with the question "(Matt) Stone and (Trey) Parker can do whatever they want with 'South Park.' They have the power. But if America chooses to pretend everything can just go back to normal, what good is the power to pretend otherwise?" Dan Caffrey with The A.V. Club also gave the episode a B grade, and stated in his review "The world feels a lot stranger than it did when 'Trapped In The Closet' aired back in 2005, and a more competent commander-in-chief and vaccine aren't going to magically transport everything back to better times right off the bat. That sad truth outfits the show's depiction of QAnon in the kind of resigned humor that made its way into the show during the Trump years—a recognition that you can't exaggerate what's already exaggerated."

Jesse Schedeen for IGN gave the episode an 8 out of 10, saying "The second time proves to be the charm for South Park's new standalone special format. 'The Vaccination Special' toes that line between giving fans a pleasing throwback to classic seasons while also exploring the idea that you can't really ever go back to normal."

== See also ==
- South Park (Park County, Colorado)
- South Park City
