= Saving Our Selves =

- Presented by: Anthony Anderson; Kelly Rowland; Terrence J Regina Hall
- Country of origin: United States
- Original language: English

Production
- Executive producers: Jesse Collins; Eric Cook; Dionne Harmon; Connie Orlando; Jeannáe Rouzan-Clay
- Editor: Hector Lopez
- Camera setup: Virtual
- Running time: 2 hours
- Production company: Jesse Collins Entertainment

Original release
- Network: BET
- Release: April 22, 2020

Saving Our Selves: A BET COVID-19 Relief Effort, or simply, Saving Our Selves, was a 2020 television special which aired on the American television network BET on April 22, 2020, during the COVID-19 pandemic. Hosted by Anthony Anderson, Kelly Rowland, Terrence J, and Regina Hall, the two-hour special was made to raise funds for the BET COVID-19 Relief Effort Fund, established by BET in collaboration with United Way Worldwide, aimed to support African Americans who have been severely impacted by the pandemic.

The special was simulcast on sister channels BET Her and MTV2 (with an immediate encore broadcast on VH1), along with Bounce TV. It was also broadcast worldwide via BET International and streamed on BET's website and its social media platforms, along with BET+, Tidal and Pluto TV.

It was later reported that the special has raised $16 million in funds.

== Performances ==
Performers and performances on Saving Our Selves
Artist(s)	Song(s)
Kirk Franklin; Fantasia; Jonathan McReynolds; Kelly Price; Tasha Cobbs Leonard; Le'Andria Johnson; Melvin Crispell III; Tyrese Gibson	"I Smile"
Usher; Ella Mai; Jermaine Dupri	"Don't Waste My Time"
John Legend	"Bigger Love"
D Smoke; SiR; Davion Farris; Tiffany Gouché	"Hair Down" "Fly" "Love's in Need of Love Today"
Alicia Keys	"Empire State of Mind"
Ludacris; Jermaine Dupri	"Welcome to Atlanta"
Chloe x Halle; Swae Lee	"Catch Up"
Anthony Hamilton	"Lean on Me"
Buju Banton	"All Will Be Fine"
Jhené Aiko; H.E.R.	"B.S."
Charlie Wilson	"Blessed" "Forever Valentine" "Outstanding"

== Appearances ==
- Chance the Rapper
- Deon Cole
- Tina Lifford
- Angela Rye
- Lil Wayne
- Fat Joe
- Whoopi Goldberg
- MC Lyte
- Queen Latifah
- DJ Premier
- Sean Combs
- Charlamagne tha God
- Dr. Rheeda Walker
- Kareem Abdul-Jabbar
- Keisha Lance Bottoms
- DJ Khaled
- Halle Berry
- Idris Elba
- Symone Sanders
- D-Nice
- Tiffany Haddish
- Ciara
- Nomalanga Shozi
- Flora Coquerel
- Jourdan Riane
- Young T & Bugsey
- Sabrina Elba
- Lizzo
- Morris Chestnut
- Al Sharpton
- Don Cheadle
- Kevin Hart
- Cupid

== See also ==
- Impact of the COVID-19 pandemic on television in the United States
