= Adrien Beard =

American voice actor and storyboard artist

- Born: 1970 or 1971 (age 55–56)
- Occupations: Voice actor, storyboard artist, producer, director
- Years active: 1997–present

Adrien Beard (born 1970 or 1971) is an American voice actor, storyboard artist, producer, and director. He provides the voice of Tolkien (Token) Black in South Park, as well as serving as the art director and lead storyboarder on the series.

Beard has won three Primetime Emmy Awards for his work on South Park and has been nominated for two others.

== Filmography ==
=== Television ===
Year	Title	Role	Notes
2000–present	South Park	Tolkien (Token) Black, Steve Black, Squirrely the Squirrel, Various voices	68 episodes; also storyboard artist
2021	South Park: Post Covid	Token Black (voice)	Television special Also producer
2021	South Park: Post Covid: The Return of Covid	Token Black (voice)	Television special Also producer
2022	South Park: The Streaming Wars	Tolkien Black, Steve Black (voice)	Television special Also producer
2022	South Park: The Streaming Wars Part 2	Tolkien Black, Steve Black (voice)	Television special Also producer
2023	South Park: Joining the Panderverse	Steve Black (voice)	Television special Also producer

=== Video games ===
Year	Title	Role	Notes
2008	South Park Imaginationland	Token Black, Squirrely the Squirrel	
2009	South Park Let's Go Tower Defense Play!	Token Black	
2014	South Park: The Stick of Truth	Token Black, Squirrely the Squirrel, Additional Voices	
2017	South Park: The Fractured but Whole	Token Black, Squirrely the Squirrel, Additional Voices	Also producer
2017	South Park: Phone Destroyer	Tolkien (Token) Black	
2024	South Park: Snow Day!	Tolkien Black	
