= South Park: Post COVID: The Return of COVID =

- South Park episode
- Official release poster
- Directed by: Trey Parker
- Written by: Trey Parker
- Production code: 2404
- Original air date: December 16, 2021
- Running time: 62 minutes

Episode chronology
← Previous "South Park: Post COVID"	Next → "Pajama Day"

"South Park: Post COVID: The Return of COVID" is a 2021 American adult animated comedy television special episode written and directed by Trey Parker. It is the second in a series of South Park television specials for the streaming service Paramount+ and premiered on December 16, 2021. It is a sequel to and continues the storyline of the previous special, "South Park: Post COVID". It is also the 311th episode of the series.

== Plot ==
Stan Marsh flashes back to the onset of the COVID-19 pandemic, when he and his classmates were sent home from school before they could blackmail fellow student Heather Wiliams for VIP access to a Denver Nuggets game; and the events leading to him burning down Tegridy Farms and inadvertently killing his sister Shelley, leading to their mother Sharon's suicide.

Presently, South Park remains under quarantine due to the new COVID-19 variant. On the run and guarding his last sprout of marijuana, Randy Marsh is cornered by Shady Acres nurses when Tolkien Black defeats them and takes Randy to Kenny McCormick's laboratory. At the lab, Stan, alongside Kyle Broflovski and a group of their friends, cannot get past the firewall without a voice command from either Kenny or his institutionalized associate, Victor Chouce. They realize that the experiment will need aluminum foil, all supplies of which are in grounded cargo ships. Stan and Kyle head out to retrieve Chouce while Tweek Tweak and Craig Tucker search for the foil.

At the asylum, Stan and Kyle find that "Chouce" is actually "Chaos". They enter Chaos' cell to discover that he is actually Butters Stotch, who went insane after his parents abandoned him. In his isolation, Chaos began dealing in NFTs, for which he was institutionalized. Stan and Kyle are removed from Chaos' cell, but Chaos later escapes. Meanwhile, Randy cultivates his marijuana as the others explain Kenny's plans to prevent the pandemic. Randy refuses to cooperate and reveals that all possible timelines involve his sex acts with the pangolin. Their plans are further complicated by Clyde Donovan's refusal to be vaccinated.

The Cartman family take refuge at the church building. Eric Cartman forms the Foundation Against Time Travel, intent on preventing Kenny's plan. Tweek and Craig arrive at the church and inadvertently inform Cartman of their purpose, resulting in their capture. Cartman convinces Clyde to join his cause; he later recruits Chaos, who brainwashes Stan and Kyle's group into investing in NFTs while Cartman and his group steal the time travel equipment. At the church, Cartman reveals his plan to have Kyle killed in the past, while Kyle and Stan undo Chaos' brainwashing upon their return. Wendy Testaburger reveals that Kenny's plan was not to prevent the pandemic, but to salvage the boys' friendship and improve the future; Tolkien states that "Tegridy Weed" served as a reminder to take some marijuana with him. A depressed Randy forgives Stan for his actions and gives him his last seed of marijuana.

Cartman prepares for Clyde to travel back in time when Stan and Kyle arrive and use their Amazon Alexas to neutralize Chaos. Cartman and Kyle begin fighting until Yentl, Cartman's wife, convinces him to allow Kyle and Stan to implement their plan. However, Cartman’s infant son activates the machine, sending Clyde back in time. Arriving to retrieve his father's gun, Clyde convinces his past self not to be vaccinated. Adult Clyde approaches the boys with the intent to kill young Kyle when Stan, Kyle, and Cartman arrive, having traveled through time to intervene. Before Clyde can fire, Cartman shoots him dead.

Realizing that they cannot prevent the pandemic, Stan, Kyle, and Cartman instead decide to change their reaction. They approach Heather Williams and blackmail her to get their younger selves courtside tickets to the Nuggets game, where the boys forgive each other. Randy receives the marijuana strain from the future and cultivates it for mass distribution. Under its influence, the townspeople forgive each other for their behavior during the pandemic, changing the future. Almost everyone's lives have changed for the better in the revised future. Stan has become part of the United States Space Force and continues his romance with Wendy, while Kyle has become a father of two kids, and Jimmy remains a raunchy stand-up comedian. Sharon, Shelley, and Kenny are alive and Butters never went insane, Timmy has become able to walk (although he still needs a cane) and say more than just his name, while Cartman has become a homeless and bitter alcoholic.

== Cast ==
- Trey Parker
- Matt Stone
- April Stewart
- Mona Marshall
- Kimberly Brooks
- Adrien Beard
- Delilah Kujala
- Betty Boogie Parker

== Reception ==
Dan Caffey of The A.V. Club said about the special "Picking up where November's Post COVID left off, The Return of COVID finds South Park's grownup kids in full Avengers: Endgame mode, trying to figure out how to travel back in time to reverse the shitty present in which they currently live. If that sounds like an overly basic distillation of the plot, that's because, like the first movie, The Return of COVID complicates the story with subplots that sometimes make the core narrative feel like it's stalling." The ending of the special, which revealed the fate of an adult Eric Cartman, led to some strong reactions from longtime fans of the show.

== See also ==
- South Park (Park County, Colorado)
- South Park City
