= The Pandemic Special =

- South Park episode
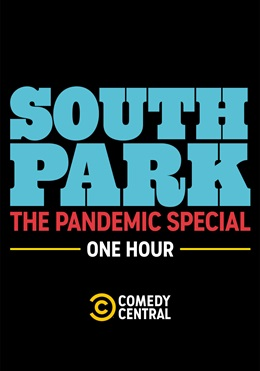
- Episode no.: Season 24; Episode 1
- Directed by: Trey Parker
- Written by: Trey Parker
- Production code: 2401
- Original air date: September 30, 2020
- Running time: 48 minutes (Note: Advertised as a one-hour special in some countries, which includes commercial breaks.)

Episode chronology
← Previous "Christmas Snow"	Next → "South ParQ Vaccination Special"
- South Park season 24

"The Pandemic Special" is the first episode of the twenty-fourth season of the American animated television series South Park. (Note: Some sources, including Comedy Central's website, listed "The Pandemic Special" and "South ParQ Vaccination Special" as part of the twenty-fourth season, while other sources suggested that they were standalone examples. This conflict was resolved when Season 25 was officially announced.) The 308th episode overall of the series, it premiered on Comedy Central in the United States on September 30, 2020, and was also simulcast on MTV and MTV2.

"The Pandemic Special" centers on the impact of the COVID-19 pandemic on the residents of South Park; it particularly focuses on Randy Marsh, who is desperate to conceal his role in the outbreak of the pandemic, while the students of South Park Elementary are placed on lockdown following an incident with police. The episode satirizes aspects of the United States' response to the pandemic, police brutality and racial unrest, including mental health, handling of face masks, education, Sinophobia and divestment from the police. Critics praised the social commentary and humor, but criticized the plot and overall length of the episode, with Adam Beam of The Slate opining that the episode's running time was not sufficient to develop its various story threads.

It was the highest-rated South Park episode in over seven years, amassing over 4.05 million viewers and becoming the most-watched program of the night.

After its premiere, the episode was released on the South Park website for free, as well as on the Comedy Central app and website with TV Everywhere authentication. It was also released on HBO Max in the United States 24 hours after its premiere, becoming the first new South Park episode released after the service acquired the series' streaming rights.

== Plot ==
The COVID-19 pandemic has had a significant impact on South Park. To Butters Stotch's chagrin, his paranoid parents refuse to take him to Build-A-Bear Workshop even as restrictions are eased. Butters' father, Stephen, criticizes improperly worn masks as "chin diapers" when he notices the townspeople gathering for an assembly by Randy Marsh, who is offering a strain of marijuana called the Pandemic Special. His wife, Sharon, berates Randy for attempting to profit from the pandemic.

Meanwhile, Eric Cartman is ecstatic about social distancing, as he can avoid remote classes by faking connection problems with Zoom. He becomes infuriated when his mother, Liane, informs him of plans to reopen the school.

Randy boasts of his success with the Pandemic Special when Sharon reveals that her brother, Jimbo Kern, is hospitalized with COVID-19, which Randy dismisses. A news report reveals that the pandemic's origins were traced to a bat in Wuhan, which prompts a flashback to Randy's visit to China, during which he and Mickey Mouse had sex with a bat. Realizing that they are responsible for the outbreak, Randy is overcome with guilt. A later news report reveals the source to instead be a pangolin, with which Randy and Mickey also had sex.

The South Park Elementary school board convenes a Zoom meeting led by Mr. Mackey, which devolves into a shouting match of obscenities. The board decides that the school will reopen, but will be run by the now-defunct police department, which had lost most of its funding due to police violence. Sergeant Harrison Yates and his officers struggle to adapt to teaching when Cartman is dragged in and handcuffed to a chair as class begins. Attempting to escape, Cartman incites a fight with Kyle Broflovski. The police attempt to break them up, but end up shooting Token Black.

The pangolin is brought to the United States for research in developing a vaccine. Desperate to avoid being found out, Randy absconds with the pangolin. Mickey threatens to have Randy killed and send his DNA samples to scientists for studies. Randy convinces Mickey to spare him, promising to find a cure; he later laces the Pandemic Special with his semen and secretly tests it on Jimbo. It initially proves successful, and Randy sells the semen-laced Special to an influx of customers. However, Jimbo and several others soon relapse and grow mustaches similar to Randy's, resulting in numerous hospitalizations. Anthony Fauci appears at a press conference, where some in attendance dismiss his advice.

The police claim that Token tested positive for COVID-19 and the entire school is placed under increasingly strict lockdown. Butters becomes increasingly upset that he may never get to visit Build-A-Bear, while Stan Marsh starts to suffer a nervous breakdown. Stan calls President Garrison to appeal to him. Garrison, however, refuses to act, citing the virus' disproportionate effect on Mexicans.

Stan promises to take Butters to Build-A-Bear and convinces the students to escape from the school. Protests, rioting, and looting ensue, prompting Mayor McDaniels to reimburse the police with supplies to quell the unrest. Kenny McCormick is among those killed by the police. The boys break into Build-A-Bear, but Stan cannot properly operate the equipment. The police prepare to shoot at the boys when Randy arrives with the pangolin. Cartman seizes the pangolin with the intent to kill it, but relents when Stan makes an impassioned speech. Cartman gives the pangolin to a scientist, only for Garrison to immolate them with a flamethrower before reminding people to vote in the upcoming election.

In the aftermath, wildfires have broken out, and South Park is placed under lockdown. Randy is about to confess his actions to Sharon when he notices a mustache on her face before departing to produce more specials.

== Ratings ==
The episode drew 2.3 million viewers on Comedy Central and a total of 4.05 million viewers overall including the simulcast on MTV and MTV2, making it the highest-rated South Park episode since 2014's "Go Fund Yourself". The episode was the number one rated cable broadcast on the evening of September 30, 2020.

== Critical reception ==
Jesse Schedeen, writing for IGN gave the episode a 5 out of 10, writing, "There's no doubt that some new South Park is better than no South Park at all. Unfortunately, the series' first experiment with a longer, standalone format doesn't really pay off. 'The Pandemic Special' has moments of comedic brilliance but is brought down by a messy plot that struggles to put a fresh spin on the reality of life in 2020." Stephanie Williams for The A.V. Club gave the episode a B+, stating, "While things were far from normal for the residents of South Park in this hour-long special, the show stays true to form, offering a surprising source of consistency. The world is in complete chaos, which couldn't be any more on-brand for South Park."

Ben Travers of IndieWire gave the special an overall grade of B-, praising the special for how it tackled the social issues, stating, "...kudos to South Park for being one of the first scripted series to tackle America's new normal head-on, all the while making the case against its very existence. The hourlong special had plenty of targets — from trigger-happy cops to a bat-raping Mickey Mouse — but it only really dialed in on its own relevance in these trying times. And in the end, 'The Pandemic Special' is only here because TV is an essential — and still lucrative — service." Andrew Bloom from Consequence of Sound gave the special a mixed review, praising the social commentary but criticising the plot, stating, "'The Pandemic Special' is unlikely to become anyone's new favorite episode of South Park. Randy's adventures are fine but nothing truly new. Cartman's homebody preservationism is amusing but slight. And the social commentary at play here is entertaining, but not exactly revolutionary. What's novel, though, is that sort of sincerity and vulnerability coming from the show's usual mouthpiece, echoing what we're all going through right now. There's a particular resonance to that at the present moment, especially when a series that can otherwise project the sense of being 'above it all' is admitting that this hurts."

A point of criticism for multiple reviewers was the overall length of the special. Writing for The Slate, Adam Beam stated, "The hour-long runtime greatly hurts this special, and a lot of this material would work better if the show was given more time to develop. Maybe as their own individual episodes. While plenty of the jokes land and many 'South Park' fans will enjoy, 'The Pandemic Special' lacks any kind of focus as it struggles to cram too much material into a very limited time frame. No matter how you feel about the special, the creative team continues to work on the new season remotely."

The special was nominated for a 2021 Primetime Emmy Award for Outstanding Animated Program.
