= Blackness =

Blackness may refer to:

- the property of being of black colour in general
- Blackness (typography), the amount of ink on a page
- Black studies, an interdisciplinary academic field, exploring the identity of blackness

== Race ==
- African-American culture, also known as black culture, in the United States refers to the cultural contributions of African Americans to the culture of the United States, either as part of or distinct from American culture
  - Black nationalism, advocates a racial definition (or redefinition) of national identity, as opposed to multiculturalism
  - Black pride, a slogan indicating pride in being black. Related movements include black nationalism, Black Panther, and Afrocentrism
  - Négritude, a literary and ideological movement, developed by francophone black intellectuals, writers, and politicians in France in the 1930s by a group that included the future Senegalese President Léopold Sédar Senghor, Martinican poet Aimé Césaire, and the Guianan Léon Damas
  - Black is beautiful, a cultural movement that began in the United States of America in the 1960s by African Americans
- Among Indigenous Australians, a variation, Blackness, has emerged as a term and concept to refer to local issues of black identity that don't necessarily borrow from North American culture.
- The Masque of Blackness, English masque of January 1605, featuring courtier actors disguised in the person of African rivers

== Locations ==
- Blackness Point, River Dart, Devon, United Kingdom
- Blackness, Dundee, Scotland, United Kingdom
- Blackness, Falkirk, Scotland, United Kingdom
  - Blackness Castle, a 15th-century fortress, near the village of Blackness, Scotland, on the south shore of the Firth of Forth
