= Tolkien Black =

Fictional character from South Park

- South Park character
- First appearance: "Cartman Gets an Anal Probe" (1997)
- Created by: Trey Parker; Matt Stone
- Designed by: Trey Parker; Matt Stone
- Voiced by: Trey Parker (1999); Adrien Beard (2000–present); Lou Rawls (singing voice; "Wing")

In-universe information
- Alias: Tupperware
- Gender: Male
- Occupation: Elementary school student; Police officer (future)
- Family: Linda Black (mother); Steve Black (father)
- Significant other: Nichole Daniels (girlfriend)
- Education: South Park Elementary
- Residence: South Park, Colorado, United States

Tolkien Black is a fictional character in the adult animated television series South Park. He was voiced by Trey Parker in early appearances, but South Park art director Adrien Beard took over in 2000 and has performed the character since. Until 2022, the character's name was Token Black as a play on tokenism. He formerly had the last name "Williams". His name was retconned in the episode "The Big Fix" to be Tolkien, after J. R. R. Tolkien, though earlier episodes now have his name spelled Tolkien in the closed captioning.

== Biography ==
Tolkien attends South Park Elementary, initially as a third-grade student of Mr. Garrison's class before moving up to fourth-grade. He was originally the only black student attending the school until Nichole Daniels was introduced in "Cartman Finds Love". Residing in South Park, he is the only child and son of Steve and Linda Black, who were originally the only African-American family in the town until the Daniels family first appeared. The character is seen as upper-class within the show, and he is often found to be ridiculed by other characters for his family's wealth relative to other students. His parents are wealthy, he wears high-priced attire, and his family resides in the largest home within their local community.

== Character ==
=== Creation and design ===
Tolkien debuted in the series' first episode, "Cartman Gets an Anal Probe", though having no spoken lines. He was composed with construction paper and animated through stop motion. From "Weight Gain 4000" onward he is animated digitally, though in a way which mimics the original use of the construction paper. Tolkien is not offered the same free-ranged motion as hand-drawn characters, as he is shown on one angle, and is animated with a jerky fashion. The first episode with a major focus on the character, was "Cartman's Silly Hate Crime 2000".

Tolkien is African-American, with dark brown skin and short black hair, and usually wears a light purple long-sleeve shirt with a yellow letter "T" on it. The character is voiced by actor Adrien Beard. Beard speaks with his normal vocal range and is edited with Pro Tools, which alters the pitch to that of a 10-year-old. He has a natural innate ability to play the bass guitar.

The character's first name was revealed to be changed from "Token" to "Tolkien" in the 2022 episode, "The Big Fix". Following the release of "The Big Fix", Tolkien's name was edited in all previously released material to match the retcon, including subtitles of past episodes. Because "The Big Fix" establishes that Stan and Randy have been unaware of Tolkien's real name up until this point, Tolkien's name is still subtitled as "Token" in their dialogue. Stan and Randy are meant to represent the audience, as the episode contains a scene of a character directly speaking to the audience about Tolkien's real name.

== Analysis ==
The book 2009 Popular Culture and the Future of Politics delved into an analysis of the character. Author Ted Gournelos cited fellow academic Michael Chaney, in noting that because the Black American character was mostly written by Caucasian American writers, it was an example of minstrelsy. They pointed out that the show exemplified racial politics from a neoconservative perspective as presented by the blackness of the character and his family on the show, but that this was blackness was itself only an illusion. Similarly, the 2009 book American Pop: Popular Culture Decade by Decade edited by Bob Batchelor cited the character as an example that American culture is only able to "examine race if it comes from the mouths of cartoon characters". In his 2010 book examining popular culture, Television and American Culture, author Jason Mittell recounted how the character was able to gain an affinity for the musical instrument the bass guitar. He wrote this was an example of a racial stereotype displayed on the show, albeit one where the writers were self-aware it was being used as such and intended to parody the more general usage within the wider culture of the time period.

Philosopher Richard Hanley observed in 2011 that South Park Republicans cited the character to argue that the television show was critical of affirmative action. Hanley refuted this, positing instead that the character was simply used by the South Park creators to lampoon hypocrisy in all its forms on the show. In his 2013 book, Ethnic Humor in Multiethnic America, author David Gillota pointed out that the character's warddrobe of a purple t-shirt with a capital letter "T" on it, further served to exemplify the satire. He wrote about how the character was used in the show to examine political correctness. In their 2025 book, Critical Media Studies: An Introduction for the Digital Age, authors Brian L. Ott and Robert L. Mack discussed use of the character to make fun of the media practice of tokenism, whereby one character of a racial minority may be easily replaced or swapped out for another within the genre. They wrote that the South Park writers created the character in order to further engage in satire of this practice within drama.

== Reception ==
Ranker listed the character as the top choice of "The Greatest Token Minority Characters in Sitcoms". Paste magazine ranked him No. 17 on their list of 20 best South Park characters. He was ranked No. 19 on the Looper list of 25 popular South Park characters. Comic Book Resources wrote that due to the fact the character was only utilized during episodes that commented upon race relations in the U.S., it had the impact of "leaving fans wanting more of his character".

== See also ==
- Affirmative action
- Ambivalent prejudice
- Benevolent prejudice
- Color-blind casting
- I'm not racist, I have black friends
- Model minority
- Performative activism
- Quotaism
- Race and ethnicity in the United States
- Smurfette principle
- The Spook Who Sat by the Door (film)
