= South Park City =

- Historical reenactors at the South Park City Museum, 2015
- Established: 1959
- Location: 100 4th Street; Fairplay, Colorado
- Coordinates: 39°13′31″N 106°00′16″W
- Type: Open air museum
- Website: www.southparkcity.org

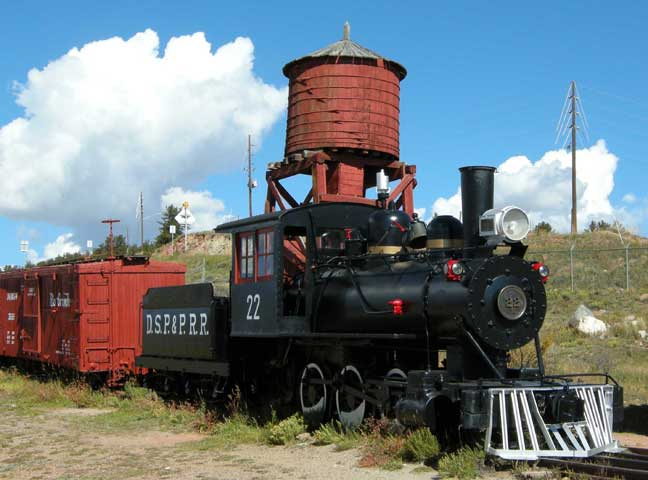
Old steam engine at South Park City

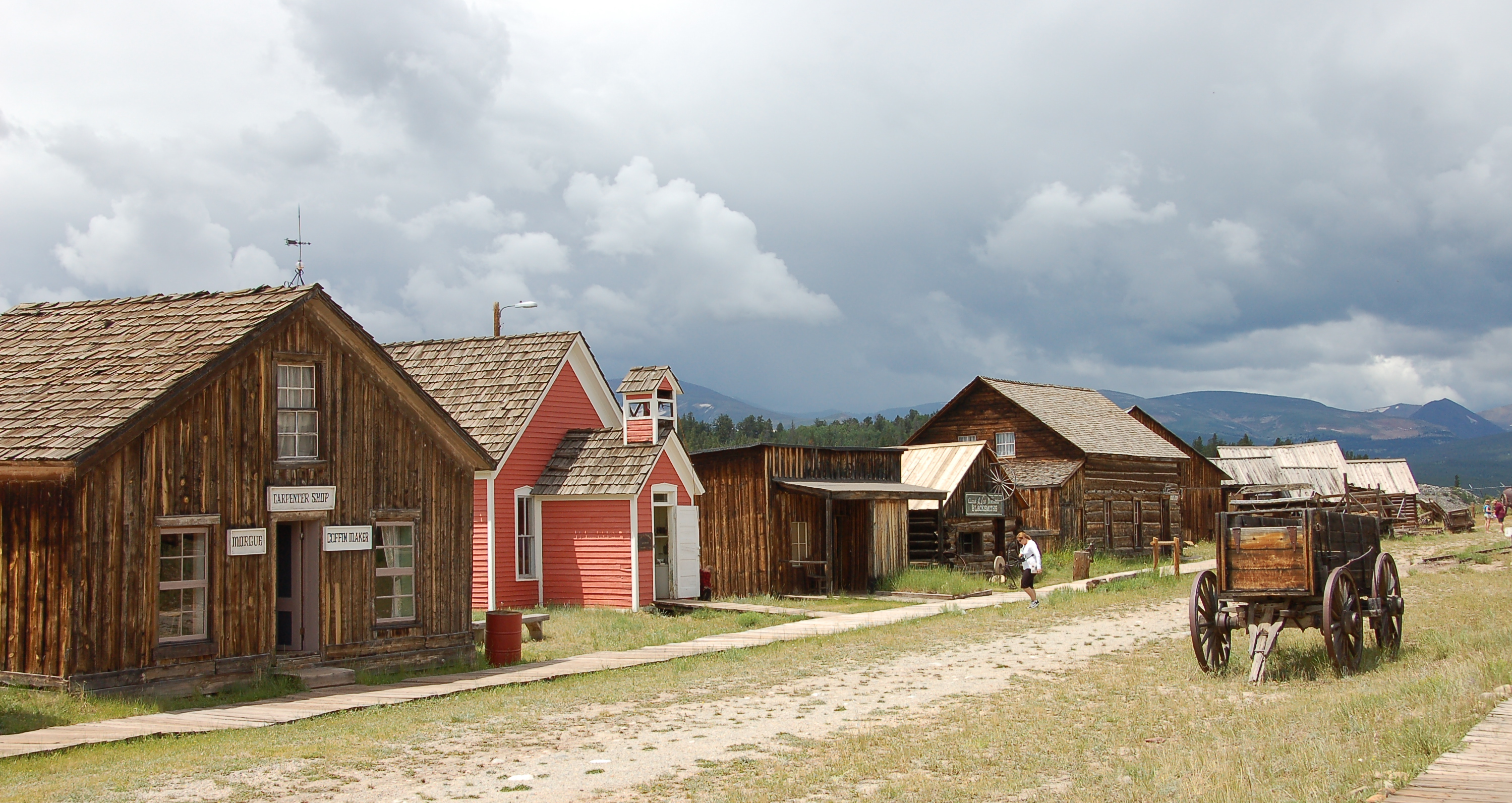
Main street with Morgue and Carpenter Shop

South Park City is an open-air museum located at the west end of Front Street in the town of Fairplay in Park County, Colorado. The museum is a historic reconstruction of a mining town from the days of the Colorado Gold Rush and the later Colorado Silver Boom in South Park in the late 1850s through the 1880s.

The museum contains thirty-five authentic relocated buildings filled with over 60,000 artifacts that depict many of the economic and social aspects of life in a gold or silver mining town in Colorado in the late 19th century. Two of the buildings, the South Park Brewery and the Summer Saloon, are listed in the National Register of Historic Places.

A log structure known as "Father Dyer’s Chapel" was a hotel in Montgomery, Colorado but was dismantled, moved to Fairplay, and rebuilt as a church in 1868. It is named for John Lewis Dyer, the itinerant Methodist clergyman who preached in the area from 1861 to 1877 and is one of the sixteen founders of Colorado memorialized in the Colorado State Capitol in Denver.

The museum was opened in 1959 after two years of preparation by the South Park Historical Foundation. It is open daily from mid-May to mid-October.

On the second weekend of August, South Park City hosts Living History Days in which volunteers in period dress perform the role of 19th-century townspeople. Living History Days romanticizes the vices of frontier America, such as playing Faro, which became popular during the California gold rush of 1849. It is illegal to play faro for money in all fifty states because the odds favor the players. Faro demonstrations will be conducted at Rache's Place Saloon in the park.

The museum was listed on the National Register of Historic Places in 2015.
