= List of Ex on the Beach Italia cast members =

The following is a list of cast members who have appeared in the Italian reality television programme Ex on the Beach Italia.

== Cast ==
Season	Cast member	Age	Exes
1	**Andrea Zolli**	29	Tecla De Santis
1	**Federica Pacela**	31	Yuri Rambaldi
1	**Gianluca Giargiulo**	27	Alssia
1	**Gianmarco Capironi**	29	Naomi De Crescenzo, Jessica Salazar
1	**Jessica Ferrara**	27	Renato Biancardi
1	**Michele De Falco**	23	—N/a
1	**Vanessa Sedita**	21	Luciana Capolongo, Deliel Moiana
1	Tecla De Santis	28	Andrea Zolli
1	Yuri Rambaldi	25	Federica Pacela, Raffaella Cafagna
1	Naomi De Crescenzo	22	Gianmarco Capironi
1	Renato Biancardi	25	Jessica Ferrara
1	Jessica Salazar		Gianmarco Capironi
1	Luciana Capolongo		Vanessa Sedita
1	Raffaella Cafagna	24	Yuri Rambaldi
1	Deliel Moiana	27	Vanessa Sedita
1	Alessia Arati	40	Gianluca Gargiulo
2	**Daniele Tosto**	22	Greta De Santi
2	**Denise Rossi**	22	Simone Amato
2	**Fabiana Barra**	21	Matteo Marconato
2	**Klea Marku**	24	Alessio Mattioni
2	**Lucrezia Borlini**	23	Mattia Garufi
2	**Matteo Diamante**	30	Nikita Pelizon
2	**Sasha Donatelli**	27	Fanny Armi, Wendy Lorena
2	Alessio Mattioni	29	Klea Marku, Violetta Gamberini
2	Simone Amato	30	Denise Rossi, Melissa
2	Fanny Armi	29	Sasha Donatelli
2	Greta De Santi	19	Daniele Tosto
2	Violetta Gamberini	24	Alessio Mattioni, Andrea Sirotti
2	Mattia Garufi	24	Lucrezia Borlini
2	Melissa Rizzetto	28	Simone Amato
2	Andrea Sirotti		Violetta Gamberini
2	Nikita Pelizon	25	Matteo Diamante
2	Wendy Lorena		Sasha Donatelli
2	Matteo Marconato		Fabiana Barra
3	**Cecilia Palloni**	22	Stefano Spelta
3	**Donato Russillo**	27	Sara La Pietra
3	**Federica Tirassa**	21	Carmine Pellino
3	**Federico Alpone**	22	Giulia Dell'Aiera, Sara La Pietra
3	**Giampaolo Calvaresi**	29	Gabriella Alluigi
3	**Khady Gueye**	24	Dario Fabris
3	**Luana Cerbino**	27	Sasha Donatelli
3	**Manuel Dosio**	23	Susan Larcher
3	**Syria Zito**	21	Giordano Perotti
3	Stefano Spelta		Cecilia Palloni
3	Gabriella Alluigi		Giampaolo Calvaresi
3	Giordano Perotti	22	Ludovica Petrella, Syria Zito
3	Sasha Donatelli	28	Luana Cerbino
3	Sara La Pietra	24	Donato Russillo, Federico Alpone
3	Dario Fabris	30	Khady Gueye
3	Giulia Dell'Aiera	25	Federico Alpone
3	Ludovica Petrella		Giordano Perotti
3	Susan Larcher	22	Andrea Coletti, Manuel Dosio
3	Carmine Pellino	33	Federica Tirassa
3	Andrea Coletti		Susan Larcher
4	**Alessandra Destefanis**	24	Alessia Andreano
4	**Antonio "Pistacchione" Latella**	32	Jasmin Salvati
4	**Camilla Natali**	25	Lorenzo Bonanni
4	**Danilo Scorca**	29	—N/a
4	**Eleonora Garrioli**	24	Gianmarco Pietrantoni
4	**Manuel Rossato**	24	Martina Aquilio
4	**Matteo Cavalieri**	26	Naike Zilla
4	**Valentina Della Valle**	22	Andrea Bardaro, Paola Morandi
4	Gianmarco Pietrantoni	25	Chiara Gioco, Eleonora Garrioli
4	Jasmin Salvati	22	Antonio Latella, Simone Simoni
4	Andrea Bardaro	25	Valentina Della Valle, Vanessa Chindamo
4	Chiara Gioco	26	Gianmarco Pietrantoni
4	Vanessa Chindamo	29	Andrea Bardaro
4	Lorenzo Bonanni	32	Camilla Natali
4	Martina Aquilio	26	Manuel Rossato
4	Simone Simoni	20	Jasmin Salvati
4	Alessia Andreano	25	Alessandra Destefanis
4	Paola Morandi	24	Valentina Della Valle
4	Naike Zilla	20	Matteo Cavalieri, Paolo Campidelli
4	Paolo Campidelli	27	Naike Zilla
5	**Denis Adrija**	22	Marco Baiata
5	**Elisabeth Shostak**	26	Samuele Durosini
5	**Giulio Pastorelli**	28	Clarissa Festa
5	**Jasmine Pili**	26	Daniele Paglia
5	**José Feliz**	28	Giulia Dell'Aiera
5	**Karin Conti**	27	Federico Tassi
5	**Laura di Lullo**	26	Samuele Durosini, Diego Graziani
5	**Matteo Cavalieri**	23	Laura Libbi
5	Marco Baiata	29	Denis Adrija, Daniele Serra
5	Laura Libbi	18	Matteo Cavalieri, Alberto Torres Magro
5	Samuele Durosini	24	Elisabeth Shostak, Laura di Lullo
5	Daniele Paglia	25	Jasmine Pili
5	Giulia Dell'Aiera	27	José Feliz, Donato Russillo
5	Clarissa Festa	27	Giulio Pastorelli, Federico Tassi
5	Daniele Serra	23	Marco Baiata
5	Donato Russillo	29	Giulia Dell'Aiera
5	Federico "Freddie" Tassi		Karin Conti, Clarissa Festa
5	Alberto Torres Magro	25	Laura Libbi, Elsa Ochea
5	Elsa Ochea	23	Alberto Torres Magro
5	Diego Graziani		Laura di Lullo

- **Bold** indicates original cast member; all other cast were brought into the series as an ex
- Ages at the time the cast member appeared in the series

Key: = "Cast member" returns to the beach for the second time
