= List of Paramount+ original programming =

This article lists all television programming produced for release on Paramount+, an American over-the-top subscription video on demand service owned and operated by the Paramount Streaming division of Paramount Skydance Corporation. It features television shows, live streams of CBS for local affiliates in the United States (although pending availability), and miniseries and specials from the libraries of Paramount Global as a whole, including content from the libraries of CBS, CBS Sports, CBS News, Nickelodeon, MTV, Comedy Central, Paramount Network, Paramount Pictures, Showtime, BET, VH1, and the Smithsonian Channel.

== Current programming ==
=== Drama ===
Title	Genre	Premiere	Seasons	Runtime	Status
Mayor of Kingstown	Crime thriller	November 14, 2021	4 seasons, 40 episodes	34–66 min	Final season due to premiere on January 15, 2027
Star Trek: Strange New Worlds	Science fiction	May 5, 2022	4 seasons, 40 episodes	46–63 min	Renewed for final season
Tulsa King	Crime drama	November 13, 2022	4 seasons, 39 episodes	36–43 min	Season 4 ongoing Renewed
School Spirits	Supernatural teen drama	March 9, 2023	3 seasons, 24 episodes	44–56 min	Renewed
Lioness	Spy drama	July 23, 2023	3 seasons, 24 episodes	38–57 min	Pending
Landman	Drama	November 17, 2024	2 seasons, 20 episodes	43–80 min	Renewed
MobLand	Crime drama	March 30, 2025	2 seasons, 20 episodes	38–59 min	Renewed
Girl Taken	Thriller	January 8, 2026	1 season, 6 episodes	46–53 min	Pending
Star Trek: Starfleet Academy	Science fiction	January 15, 2026	1 season, 10 episodes	55–75 min	Renewed for final season
The Madison	Neo-Western	March 14, 2026	1 season, 6 episodes	46–68 min	Renewed for seasons 2–3
Dutton Ranch	Neo-Western	May 15, 2026	1 season, 9 episodes	46–55 min	Renewed
Awaiting release
Who the Hell Is Hamish?	True crime drama	December 10, 2026	1 season, 6 episodes	60 min	Pending
Frisco King	Crime drama	December 18, 2026	1 season, 8 episodes	TBA	Pending

=== Comedy ===
Title	Genre	Premiere	Seasons	Runtime	Status
The Varnell Hill Show	Workplace comedy	September 1, 2026	1 season, 8 episodes	29–30 min	Pending

=== Animation ===
==== Adult animation ====
Title	Genre	Premiere	Seasons	Runtime	Status
Ark: The Animated Series	Science fiction drama	March 21, 2024	1 season, 13 episodes	24–47 min	Season 1, part 2 due to premiere in 2026
Among Us	Science fiction comedy	June 5, 2026	1 season, 10 episodes	13–15 min	Pending
Golden Axe	Animated sitcom	September 16, 2026	1 season, 10 episodes	21 min	Pending

==== Kids & family ====
Title	Genre	Premiere	Seasons	Runtime	Status
Dora	Adventure	April 12, 2024	4 seasons, 104 episodes	11–12 min	Renewed for seasons 5–6
Avatar: Seven Havens	Fantasy action	October 9, 2026	1 season, 13 episodes	22–23 min	Season 2 due to premiere on May 21, 2027; Renewed for seasons 3–4 (final)
Awaiting release
Garfield	Comedy	December 11, 2026	TBA	TBA	Pending

=== Unscripted ===
==== Docuseries ====
Title	Genre	Premiere	Seasons	Runtime	Status
FBI True (seasons 1–3, 5–8)	True crime	February 28, 2023	7 seasons, 74 episodes (Note: First-run episodes of season 4 aired on CBS.)	22–28 min	Season 9 due to premiere on December 1, 2026
Pulisic	Sports	December 9, 2024	1 season, 9 episodes	29–44 min	Pending
5-Star	Sports	December 2, 2025	1 season, 8 episodes	41–47 min	Pending
Awaiting release
The Elite: Army Rangers	Military	December 8, 2026	4 episodes	TBA	Miniseries

==== Reality ====
Title	Genre	Premiere	Seasons	Runtime	Status
Canada Shore	Reality	January 22, 2026	1 season, 7 episodes	43–54 min	Season 2 due to premiere on January 7, 2027
Team Moms: Baseball	Docu-soap	September 24, 2026	1 season, 8 episodes	44–50 min	Pending
Big John's Bosh! Family	Reality	November 5, 2026	1 season, 6 episodes	32–37 min	Pending

==== Variety ====
Title	Genre	Premiere	Seasons	Runtime	Status
The Ready Room	Aftershow	January 26, 2019	103 episodes	14–56 min	Ongoing
NFL Play Action	Sports talk show	September 9, 2026	1 season, 13 episodes	33 min	Season 1 ongoing

=== Co-productions ===
Title	Genre	Partner/Country	Premiere	Seasons	Runtime	Language	Status
SkyMed	Medical drama	CBC/Canada	July 10, 2022	4 seasons, 35 episodes	43–46 min	English	Pending
Can You Keep a Secret?	Sitcom	BBC One/United Kingdom	February 12, 2026	1 season, 6 episodes	27–28 min	English	Pending (Note: The series has been renewed for a second season by the BBC, but it is currently unconfirmed whether it will be released on Paramount+.)

=== Continuations ===
Title	Genre	Prev. network(s)	Premiere	Seasons	Runtime	Status
RuPaul's Drag Race All Stars (seasons 6–11)	Reality competition	Logo (seasons 1–2); VH1 (seasons 3–5)	June 24, 2021	6 seasons, 72 episodes	61–83 min	Renewed
RuPaul's Drag Race All Stars: Untucked (seasons 3–8)	Reality competition	Logo (season 1); VH1 (season 2)	June 24, 2021	6 seasons, 72 episodes	20–22 min	Renewed
Ink Master (seasons 14–17)	Reality competition	Spike (seasons 1–10); Paramount Network (seasons 10–13)	September 7, 2022	4 seasons, 40 episodes	43–62 min	Pending
Criminal Minds (seasons 16–19)	Crime drama	CBS	November 24, 2022	4 seasons, 40 episodes	44–56 min	Renewed for final season
Divorced Sistas (season 1B)	Comedy drama	BET+	April 15, 2026	1 season, 8 episodes	39–46 min	Renewed
Zatima (season 4B)	Comedy drama	BET+	May 12, 2026	1 season, 10 episodes	26–33 min	Renewed
All the Queen's Men (season 5)	Drama	BET+	June 10, 2026	1 season, 16 episodes	45–46 min	Final season ongoing
The Agency (season 2)	Spy thriller	Showtime	June 21, 2026	1 season, 10 episodes	46–58 min	Pending
Ruthless (season 6)	Drama	BET+	June 30, 2026	1 season, 10 episodes	40–43 min	New episodes due to premiere on December 1, 2026
Diarra from Detroit (season 2)	Dark comedy	BET+	July 29, 2026	1 season, 8 episodes	46–68 min	Pending
The Challenge (season 42)	Reality	MTV	August 5, 2026	1 season, 14 episodes	44–60 min	Pending
Average Joe (season 2)	Dark comedy	BET+	August 19, 2026	1 season, 8 episodes	43–59 min	Pending
Sacrifice (season 2)	Thriller	BET+	September 30, 2026	1 season, 10 episodes	44–48 min	Season 2 ongoing
Awaiting release
Lil Kev (season 2)	Adult animated sitcom	BET+	December 9, 2026	1 season, 10 episodes	TBA	Pending

=== Regional original programming ===
These shows are originals because Paramount+ commissioned or acquired them and had their premiere on the service, but they are not available worldwide.

==== English language ====
Title	Genre	Premiere	Seasons	Runtime	Exclusive region(s)	Status
The Inspired Unemployed (Impractical) Jokers	Hidden camera-practical joke reality	August 9, 2023	4 seasons, 32 episodes	24–28 min	Australia	Pending
NCIS: Sydney	Military police procedural	November 10, 2023	3 seasons, 38 episodes	42–44 min	Selected territories (Note: Australia, New Zealand, UK, South Korea, Italy, France, Germany, Switzerland, Austria, Japan. Episodes premiere first-run on Global in Canada and on CBS in the United States.)	Renewed
Dating Naked UK	Dating show	August 23, 2024	2 seasons, 20 episodes	43 min	United Kingdom	Pending
Aussie Shore	Reality	October 3, 2024	2 seasons, 20 episodes	TBA	Australia and New Zealand	Renewed
The Crow Girl	Crime thriller	January 16, 2025	2 seasons, 12 episodes	46–52 min	United Kingdom	Pending
Special Ops True	Military docuseries	June 19, 2025 (Note: Canada); August 4, 2026 (Note: United States)	2 seasons, 20 episodes	22–26 min	Canada and United States	Pending
Ghosts Australia	Sitcom	November 10, 2025	1 season, 8 episodes	22–25 min	Australia	Pending
The Revenge Club	Dark comedy drama	December 12, 2025	1 season, 6 episodes	51 min	Ireland and United Kingdom	Pending
Two Years Later	Romantic comedy drama	June 4, 2026	1 season, 8 episodes	26 min	Australia	Pending
Awaiting release
The Day	Heist thriller	December 31, 2026	1 season, 8 episodes	TBA	All markets excluding Austria, Germany, and Switzerland	Pending

==== Non-English language ====
Title	Genre	Premiere	Seasons	Runtime	Exclusive region(s)	Language	Status
Rio Shore	Reality	September 30, 2021	4 seasons, 49 episodes	50–59 min	Latin America	Portuguese	Season 4 ongoing
Germany Shore (seasons 2–5) (Note: Previously aired on 3+ and Joyn)	Reality	December 15, 2022	4 seasons, 44 episodes	43–71 min	Austria, Germany and Switzerland	German	Pending
Italia Shore	Reality	March 4, 2024	3 seasons, 30 episodes	40–52 min	Italy	Italian	Pending
Mazatlán Shore	Reality	April 21, 2026	1 season, 12 episodes	40–45 min	Brazil and Latin America	Spanish	Pending

==== Continuations ====
Title	Genre	Prev. network(s)	Premiere	Seasons	Runtime	Exclusive region(s)	Status
The Ultimate Fighter (season 34)	Reality/Sports broadcast	Spike TV (seasons 1–14); FX (seasons 15–17); Fox Sports 1 (seasons 18–28); ESPN+ (seasons 29–33)	June 14, 2026	1 season, 1 episode	46 min	Australia, Latin America, and United States	Season 34 ongoing

== Upcoming original programming ==
=== Drama ===
Title	Genre	Premiere	Seasons	Runtime	Status
The Best of Us	Drama miniseries	2027	6 episodes	TBA	Filming
Discretion	Legal thriller	2027	1 season, 8 episodes	TBA	Filming
Fear Not	True crime drama miniseries	2027	6 episodes	TBA	Series order
Laird	Drama	TBA	TBA	TBA	Filming
Ascent	Thriller	TBA	TBA	TBA	Series order
Clandestine	Family drama	TBA	TBA	TBA	Series order
Mushroom Murders	True crime drama miniseries	TBA	6 episodes	TBA	Series order

=== Comedy ===
Title	Genre	Premiere	Seasons	Runtime	Status
Clueless	Comedy miniseries	TBA	6 episodes	TBA	Series order
Day 1s	Sports comedy	TBA	1 season, 10 episodes	TBA	Series order

=== Animation ===
==== Kids & family ====
Title	Genre	Premiere	Seasons	Runtime	Status
Avatar Kuruk: Wave of Chaos	Fantasy action	TBA	TBA	TBA	Series order
The Elephant & Piggie Show!	Preschool comedy	TBA	TBA	TBA	Series order
The Pigeon Show! Starring the Pigeon	Comedy	TBA	TBA	TBA	Series order

=== Unscripted ===
==== Docuseries ====
Title	Subject	Premiere	Seasons	Runtime	Status
Tulisa: The Reckoning	Celebrity/Scandal	TBA	3 episodes	TBA	Series order

==== Reality ====
Title	Genre	Premiere	Seasons	Runtime	Status
Making Love	Dating show	2027	TBA	TBA	Series order
Meet the Fishers	Reality	TBA	TBA	TBA	Series order

=== Continuations ===
Title	Genre	Prev. network(s)	Premiere	Seasons	Runtime	Status
The Black Hamptons (season 3)	Drama	BET+	TBA	1 season, 10 episodes	TBA	Season order
The Family Business (season 7)	Crime drama	BET (season 1); BET+ (seasons 2–6)	TBA	1 season, 10 episodes	TBA	Season order
The Ms. Pat Show (season 6)	Sitcom	BET+	TBA	TBA	TBA	Season order

=== Specials ===
Title	Genre	Premiere	Runtime	Language
Untitled South Park film	Adult animated comedy	2026	TBA	English
Untitled South Park film	Adult animated comedy	2026	TBA	English
Untitled South Park film	Adult animated comedy	2027	TBA	English
Untitled South Park film	Adult animated comedy	2027	TBA	English

=== Regional original programming ===
These shows are originals because Paramount+ commissioned or acquired them and will have their premiere on the service, but they will not be available worldwide.

==== English language ====
Title	Genre	Premiere	Seasons	Runtime	Status
Len & Cub	Biopic miniseries	TBA	6 episodes	60 min	Series order

==== Non-English language ====
Title	Genre	Premiere	Seasons	Runtime	Language	Status
Futuro Desierto	Dystopian thriller	TBA	1 season, 6 episodes	TBA	Spanish	Filming

==== Co-productions ====
Title	Genre	Partner/Country	Premiere	Seasons	Runtime	Language	Exclusive region(s)	Status
Trauma	Medical thriller	Amazon Prime Video/United Kingdom	TBA	TBA	TBA	English	All markets except Ireland and United Kingdom	Series order

=== In development ===
Title	Genre
Cop Land	Crime drama
Galaxy Quest	Science fiction comedy
Untitled Star Trek series	Science fiction comedy
Voyage to the Bottom of the Sea	Science fiction adventure
Zero Hour	Science fiction genre

== Ended programming ==
These shows have either completed their runs or had been canceled by Paramount+. A show is also assumed to have ended if there has been no confirmed news of renewal at least one year after the show's last episode was released.

=== Drama ===
Title	Genre	Premiere	Finale	Seasons	Runtime	Notes
The Good Fight	Legal drama	February 19, 2017	November 10, 2022	6 seasons, 60 episodes	40–59 min	
Star Trek: Discovery	Science fiction	September 24, 2017	May 30, 2024	5 seasons, 65 episodes	37–65 min	
Strange Angel	Historical drama	June 14, 2018	July 25, 2019	2 seasons, 17 episodes	46–54 min	
One Dollar	Mystery thriller	August 30, 2018	November 1, 2018	1 season, 10 episodes	50–57 min	
Star Trek: Short Treks	Science fiction anthology	October 4, 2018	January 9, 2020	2 seasons, 10 episodes	8–18 min	
Tell Me a Story	Psychological thriller anthology	October 31, 2018	February 6, 2020	2 seasons, 20 episodes	42–57 min	(Note: Unavailable)
The Twilight Zone	Science fantasy anthology	April 1, 2019	June 25, 2020	2 seasons, 20 episodes	37–56 min	
Star Trek: Picard	Science fiction	January 23, 2020	April 20, 2023	3 seasons, 30 episodes	39–62 min	
Interrogation	True crime drama	February 6, 2020		1 season, 10 episodes	39–52 min	
The Stand	Apocalyptic drama	December 17, 2020	February 11, 2021	9 episodes	49–65 min	(Note: Miniseries)
Coyote	Crime drama	January 7, 2021		1 season, 6 episodes	43–56 min	
1883	Neo-Western drama	December 19, 2021	February 27, 2022	10 episodes	44–67 min	
Halo	Military science fiction	March 24, 2022	March 21, 2024	2 seasons, 17 episodes	40–61 min	
The Offer	Drama	April 28, 2022	June 16, 2022	10 episodes	51–69 min	
1923	Neo-Western drama	December 18, 2022	April 6, 2025	2 seasons, 16 episodes	47–112 min	
Wolf Pack	Supernatural teen drama	January 26, 2023	March 16, 2023	1 season, 8 episodes	46–57 min	
Rabbit Hole	Spy drama	March 26, 2023	May 7, 2023	1 season, 8 episodes	42–56 min	
Fatal Attraction	Psychological thriller	April 30, 2023	May 28, 2023	1 season, 8 episodes	53–62 min	
Lawmen: Bass Reeves	Western drama	November 5, 2023	December 17, 2023	8 episodes	32–57 min	
Sexy Beast	Crime drama	January 25, 2024	February 29, 2024	1 season, 8 episodes	43–55 min	
Happy Face	True crime drama	March 20, 2025	May 1, 2025	1 season, 8 episodes	48–58 min	
Little Disasters	Psychological thriller	May 22, 2025 (Note: United Kingdom and Ireland); December 11, 2025 (Note: All other markets)		6 episodes	45–47 min	
NCIS: Tony & Ziva	Police procedural	September 4, 2025	October 23, 2025	1 season, 10 episodes	43–50 min	
Dalliance	Comedy drama	August 27, 2026		6 episodes	44–49 min	
Route 187	Crime drama	September 16, 2026		4 episodes	28–32 min	

=== Comedy ===
Title	Genre	Premiere	Finale	Seasons	Runtime	Notes
No Activity	Comedy	November 12, 2017	May 27, 2021	4 seasons, 32 episodes	25–33 min	
Why Women Kill	Dark comedy drama anthology	August 15, 2019	July 29, 2021	2 seasons, 20 episodes	45–56 min	
iCarly	Sitcom	June 17, 2021	July 27, 2023	3 seasons, 33 episodes	21–26 min	
Guilty Party	Dark comedy	October 14, 2021	December 9, 2021	1 season, 10 episodes	28–35 min	
The Game	Comedy drama	November 11, 2021	February 9, 2023	2 seasons, 20 episodes	29–38 min	
The Fairly OddParents: Fairly Odder	Sitcom	March 31, 2022		1 season, 13 episodes	24–25 min	
Players	Mockumentary	June 16, 2022	July 28, 2022	1 season, 10 episodes	28–35 min	
Grease: Rise of the Pink Ladies	Musical comedy	April 6, 2023	June 1, 2023	1 season, 10 episodes	48–59 min	
Frasier	Sitcom	October 12, 2023	November 14, 2024	2 seasons, 20 episodes	23–30 min	
Knuckles	Action-adventure comedy	April 26, 2024		6 episodes	23–33 min	
Crutch	Sitcom	November 3, 2025		1 season, 8 episodes	22–26 min	

=== Animation ===
==== Adult animation ====
Title	Genre	Premiere	Finale	Seasons	Runtime	Notes
Tooning Out the News	Variety news satire	April 7, 2020	November 12, 2021	2 seasons, 233 episodes	5–44 min	(Note: Moved to Comedy Central)
Star Trek: Lower Decks	Science fiction comedy	August 6, 2020	December 19, 2024	5 seasons, 50 episodes	23–30 min	
The Harper House	Comedy	September 16, 2021	November 4, 2021	1 season, 10 episodes	24–25 min	
Mike Judge's Beavis and Butt-Head	Adult animated comedy	August 4, 2022	June 29, 2023	2 seasons, 24 episodes	20–22 min	

==== Kids & family ====
Title	Genre	Premiere	Finale	Seasons	Runtime	Notes
Kamp Koral: SpongeBob's Under Years	Comedy	March 4, 2021	July 10, 2024	2 seasons, 39 episodes	22–23 min	
Rugrats	Comedy	May 27, 2021	April 14, 2023	2 seasons, 37 episodes	22–44 min	
Star Trek: Prodigy	Science fiction	October 28, 2021	December 29, 2022	1 season, 20 episodes	23–45 min	(Note: Moved to Netflix)
Big Nate	Comedy	February 17, 2022	August 26, 2024	2 seasons, 52 episodes	22–23 min	
Transformers: EarthSpark	Science fiction	November 11, 2022	December 5, 2025	4 seasons, 46 episodes	22–45 min	
Tales of the Teenage Mutant Ninja Turtles	Superhero	August 9, 2024	December 12, 2025	2 seasons, 24 episodes	22–23 min	

=== Unscripted ===
==== Docuseries ====
Title	Subject	Premiere	Finale	Seasons	Runtime	Notes
That Animal Rescue Show	Nature	October 29, 2020		1 season, 10 episodes	24–34 min	
Texas 6	Sports	November 26, 2020	November 24, 2021	2 seasons, 16 episodes	30–41 min	
From Cradle to Stage	Music	May 6, 2021	June 10, 2021	1 season, 6 episodes	43–54 min	
Behind the Music	Music	July 29, 2021	May 1, 2024	2 seasons, 38 episodes	47–66 min	
Indivisible: Healing Hate	Politics	January 6, 2022	February 10, 2022	6 episodes	46–59 min	
Wasteland	Environmental impact	February 24, 2022		4 episodes	27–30 min	
Clive Davis: Most Iconic Performances	Music	March 23, 2022		3 episodes	38–45 min	
Ghislaine: Partner in Crime	True crime	April 7, 2022		4 episodes	49–51 min	
Never Seen Again	True crime	May 10, 2022	March 12, 2025	5 seasons, 50 episodes	23–29 min	
Black Gold	True crime	May 17, 2022		3 episodes	49–55 min	
11 Minutes	True crime	September 27, 2022		4 episodes	46–52 min	
The Checkup with Dr. David Agus	Mental health	December 6, 2022	December 13, 2022	6 episodes	27–36 min	
Sampled	Music	December 13, 2022		1 season, 6 episodes	21–22 min	
Sometimes When We Touch	Music	January 3, 2023		3 episodes	45–50 min	
Murder of God's Banker	True crime	February 24, 2023		4 episodes	43–52 min	
Family Legacy	Music	April 25, 2023	March 25, 2025	2 seasons, 15 episodes	20–27 min	
Thalía's Mixtape: El soundtrack de mi vida	Music	May 2, 2023		3 episodes	30 min	
Destination: European Nights	Sports	June 6, 2023	August 16, 2023	4 episodes	18–23 min	
I Wanna Rock: The '80s Metal Dream	Music	July 18, 2023		3 episodes	43–48 min	
Football Must Go On	Sports	September 12, 2023		4 episodes	31–36 min	
72 Seconds in Rittenhouse Square	True crime	September 26, 2023		3 episodes	42–56 min	
Painkiller: The Tylenol Murders	True crime	October 10, 2023		5 episodes	33–48 min	
Crush	Crowd crush	October 17, 2023		2 episodes	44–46 min	
De la calle	Latin music	November 7, 2023		1 season, 8 episodes	44–62 min	
Geddy Lee Asks: Are Bass Players Human Too?	Music	December 5, 2023		4 episodes	21 min	
The Billion Dollar Goal	Sports	December 11, 2023		3 episodes	33–40 min	
Born in Synanon	Cults	December 12, 2023		4 episodes	55–58 min	
Willie Nelson & Family	Music	December 21, 2023		4 episodes	48–51 min	
The Changemakers	Activism	January 1, 2024		8 episodes	43–104 min	
#CyberSleuths: The Idaho Murders	True crime	February 6, 2024		3 episodes	51–58 min	
CTRL+ALT+DESIRE	True crime	April 16, 2024		3 episodes	46–48 min	
Pillowcase Murders	True crime	May 14, 2024		3 episodes	50–62 min	
Lolla: The Story of Lollapalooza	Music	May 21, 2024		3 episodes	45–58 min	
How Music Got Free	Music	June 11, 2024		2 episodes	42 min	
Chopper Cops	Law enforcement	June 18, 2024	June 17, 2025	2 seasons, 20 episodes	72–79 min	
Melissa Etheridge: I'm Not Broken	Music	July 9, 2024		2 episodes	58–60 min	
Mafia Spies	History	July 16, 2024		6 episodes	49–61 min	
PD True	True crime	August 6, 2024	November 19, 2024	2 seasons, 20 episodes	24–29 min	
Nöthin' but a Good Time: The Uncensored Story of '80s Hair Metal	Music	September 17, 2024		3 episodes	46 min	
as1one: The Israeli-Palestinian Pop Music Journey	Music	December 3, 2024		4 episodes	42–47 min	
Burden of Guilt	True crime	February 4, 2025		3 episodes	46–49 min	
Sin City Gigolo: A Murder in Las Vegas	True crime	March 4, 2025		3 episodes	47–57 min	
The Carters: Hurts to Love You	Biography/Celebrity	April 15, 2025		2 episodes	49–65 min	
Hip Hop Was Born Here	Music	July 22, 2025		1 season, 5 episodes	27–28 min	
Murder 360	True crime	August 5, 2025		1 season, 10 episodes	40–45 min	
Thirst Trap	Internet culture	September 9, 2025		2 episodes	40–51 min	
Don't Date Brandon	True crime	October 28, 2025		3 episodes	45–58 min	
My Nightmare Stalker: The Eva LaRue Story	True crime	November 13, 2025		2 episodes	44–49 min	
Handsome Devil: Charming Killer	True crime	January 20, 2026		3 episodes	46–47 min	
Wild Boys: Strangers in Town	True crime	February 18, 2026		2 episodes	45–46 min	
You Don't Know Where I'm From, Dawg	Sports	April 14, 2026		5 episodes	41–50 min	
Made for March	Sports	April 4, 2026	April 18, 2026	4 episodes	46 min	
My Killer Father: The Green Hollow Murders	True crime	April 28, 2026		3 episodes	45–52 min	
Devotion: Obedience or Betrayal	Religion/True crime	June 2, 2026		3 episodes	45–46	
The Real Wolf of Wall Street	White collar crime	July 14, 2026		3 episodes	50–52 min	
The Program: Texas Tech	Sports	September 4, 2026		4 episodes	41–47 min	
The Jigsaw Puzzle Murder	True crime	November 12, 2026		2 episodes	46–48 min	
He Said, She Said: Till Death Do Us Part	True crime	November 17, 2026		3 episodes	46–49 min	

==== Reality ====
Title	Genre	Premiere	Finale	Seasons	Runtime	Notes
Big Brother: Over the Top	Reality competition	September 28, 2016	December 1, 2016	1 season, 10 episodes	39–96 min	
The Thomas John Experience	Reality	June 4, 2020		1 season, 8 episodes	22–24 min	
The Real World Homecoming	Reality	March 4, 2021	June 8, 2022	3 seasons, 22 episodes	41–50 min	
The Challenge: All Stars	Reality competition	April 1, 2021	June 19, 2024	4 seasons, 37 episodes	43–49 min	(Note: Moved to MTV)
Queen of the Universe	Music competition	December 2, 2021	June 22, 2023	2 seasons, 14 episodes	43–47 min	
Hip Hop My House	Reality	June 21, 2022		1 season, 9 episodes	22–25 min	
All Star Shore	Reality competition	June 29, 2022	August 31, 2022	1 season, 11 episodes	42–46 min	
My Dream Quinceañera	Reality	September 16, 2022	November 4, 2022	1 season, 10 episodes	23–29 min	
The Challenge: World Championship	Reality competition	March 8, 2023 (Note: Canada and United States); March 9, 2023 (Note: Australia, Latin America and United Kingdom); March 15, 2023 (Note: Austria, France, Germany, Italy and Switzerland)	May 17, 2023	1 season, 12 episodes	45–71 min	
The Family Stallone	Reality	May 17, 2023	February 21, 2024	2 seasons, 18 episodes	20–26 min	
Love ALLways	Dating show	June 2, 2023	July 21, 2023	1 season, 10 episodes	39–55 min	
RuPaul's Drag Race Global All Stars	Reality competition	August 16, 2024	October 25, 2024	1 season, 12 episodes	45-53 min	

==== Variety ====
Title	Genre	Premiere	Finale	Seasons	Runtime	Notes
After Trek	Aftershow	September 24, 2017	February 11, 2018	1 season, 14 episodes	35–57 min	
60 Minutes+	News	March 4, 2021	September 5, 2021	1 season, 30 episodes	15–25 min	
Yo! MTV Raps	Music	May 24, 2022	July 12, 2022	1 season, 8 episodes	22–30 min	

=== Non-English language ===
Title	Genre	Premiere	Finale	Seasons	Runtime	Language	Notes
Anderson Spider Silva	Biopic	November 16, 2023 (Note: Brazil) (Note: Latin America); March 5, 2026; March 7, 2026		5 episodes	39–49 min	Portuguese	

=== Co-productions ===
Title	Genre	Partner/Country	Premiere	Finale	Seasons	Runtime	Language	Notes
For Heaven's Sake	True crime docu-comedy	CBC Gem/Canada	March 4, 2021		1 season, 8 episodes	26–32 min	English	
Yonder	Science fiction drama	TVING/South Korea	April 11, 2023		6 episodes	30–36 min	Korean	
The Gold (season 1)	Action thriller	BBC One/United Kingdom	September 14, 2023; September 17, 2023		1 season, 6 episodes	55–58 min	English	(Note: Although season 1 was a co-production between Paramount+ and the BBC, Paramount+ was not involved with production for season 2.)
Bargain	Survival thriller	TVING/South Korea	October 5, 2023		6 episodes	33–37 min	Korean	
A Bloody Lucky Day	Psychological thriller	TVING/South Korea	February 1, 2024		10 episodes	46–65 min	Korean	
Pyramid Game	Teen psychological thriller	TVING/South Korea	May 30, 2024		10 episodes	50–64 min	Korean	
Dreaming of a Freaking Fairy Tale	Romantic comedy	TVING/South Korea	September 26, 2024		10 episodes	40 min	Korean	
Zorro	Action-adventure	France Télévisions/France	November 6, 2024		1 season, 8 episodes	70 min	French	
Queen Woo	Period drama	TVING/South Korea	December 23, 2024		8 episodes	56–61 min	Korean	
Dongjae, the Good or the Bastard	Crime thriller	TVING/South Korea	March 28, 2025		10 episodes	43–57 min	Korean	
The Oval (season 7)	Political soap opera	BET/United States	May 20, 2026	September 30, 2026	1 season, 22 episodes	41–43 min	English	

=== Continuations ===
Title	Genre	Prev. network(s)	Premiere	Finale	Seasons	Runtime	Notes
Younger (season 7)	Comedy drama	TV Land	April 15, 2021	June 10, 2021	1 season, 12 episodes	25–47 min	
Evil (seasons 2–4)	Supernatural drama	CBS	June 20, 2021	August 22, 2024	3 seasons, 37 episodes	45–57 min	
Inside the NFL (seasons 45–46)	Sports talk show	HBO (seasons 1–31); Showtime (seasons 32–44)	September 7, 2021	February 14, 2023	2 seasons, 48 episodes	9–70 min	(Note: Moved to The CW)
SEAL Team (seasons 5B–7)	Military action	CBS	November 1, 2021	October 6, 2024	3 seasons, 30 episodes	43–49 min	
Next Influencer (season 3)	Reality	AwesomenessTV	January 13, 2022	February 24, 2022	1 season, 12 episodes	35–48 min	
Blood & Treasure (season 2)	Action-adventure	CBS	July 17, 2022	October 2, 2022	1 season, 13 episodes	38–43 min	
Inside Amy Schumer (season 5)	Sketch comedy	Comedy Central	October 20, 2022	November 10, 2022	1 season, 5 episodes	22–24 min	
The Real Love Boat (season 1B)	Reality competition	CBS	November 2, 2022	December 21, 2022	1 season, 8 episodes	43 min	
Are You the One? (season 9)	Dating show	MTV	January 18, 2023; January 19, 2023 (Note: Austria, Germany, Italy, Latin America, Switzerland and United Kingdom); February 1, 2023 (Note: Australia)	March 15, 2023	1 season, 10 episodes	41–46 min	
Joe Pickett (season 2)	Neo-Western crime drama	Spectrum Originals	June 4, 2023	July 30, 2023	1 season, 10 episodes	42–59 min	

=== Specials ===
Title	Genre	Premiere	Runtime	Language
Sunday Morning – Woody Allen: The Interview	Interview	March 28, 2021	35 min	English
Dragging the Classics: The Brady Bunch	Comedy	June 30, 2021	27 min	English
South Park: Post Covid	Adult animated comedy	November 25, 2021	59 min	English
South Park: Post Covid: The Return of Covid	Adult animated comedy	December 16, 2021	1 hour, 2 min	English
Reno 911! The Hunt for QAnon	Comedy	December 23, 2021	1 hour, 25 min	English
South Park: The Streaming Wars	Adult animated comedy	June 1, 2022	48 min	English
Cat Pack: A PAW Patrol Exclusive Event	Educational children's comedy	June 24, 2022	1 hour, 8 min	English
South Park: The Streaming Wars Part 2	Adult animated comedy	July 13, 2022	51 min	English
South Park: Joining the Panderverse	Adult animated comedy	October 27, 2023	48 min	English
South Park (Not Suitable for Children)	Adult animated comedy	December 20, 2023	46 min	English
South Park: The End of Obesity	Adult animated comedy	May 24, 2024	50 min	English
SpongeBob SquarePants: Kreepaway Kamp	Animated comedy	October 10, 2024	45 min	English

=== Regional original programming ===
==== English language ====
Title	Genre	Premiere	Seasons	Runtime	Exclusive region(s)	Notes
Five Bedrooms (seasons 2–4) (Note: Previously aired on Network Ten)	Comedy drama	August 11, 2021	3 seasons, 24 episodes	44–46 min	Australia	
Spreadsheet	Comedy	October 27, 2021	1 season, 8 episodes	23–27 min	Australia	
More Than This	Teen drama	March 4, 2022	1 season, 6 episodes	24 min	Australia	
The Secrets She Keeps (season 2)	Psychological thriller	July 12, 2022	1 season, 6 episodes	43 min	Australia	
Couples Therapy Australia	Docuseries	July 26, 2022	2 seasons, 12 episodes	22–28 min	Australia	
Are You the One? UK	Dating show	August 8, 2022	1 season, 10 episodes	44–66 min	United Kingdom	
The Box	True crime docuseries	August 11, 2022	3 episodes	51–58 min	United Kingdom	
The Disappearance of Gabby Petito	True crime docuseries	August 18, 2022	3 episodes	54–60 min	United Kingdom	
The Bridge Australia	Reality competition	August 19, 2022	1 season, 6 episodes	47–67 min	Australia	
Who Murdered Meredith Kercher?	True crime docuseries	August 25, 2022	2 episodes	66–67 min	United Kingdom	
Girl in the Box: The True Story	True crime docuseries	September 19, 2022	2 episodes	TBA	United Kingdom	
Millionaire Holiday Home Swap	Reality	September 25, 2022	6 episodes	42–50 min	United Kingdom	
Rise of the Billionaires	Docuseries	September 27, 2022	4 episodes	43–54 min	United Kingdom	
Sky Blue: Inside Sydney FC	Sports docuseries	September 30, 2022	4 episodes	49 min	Australia	
Undressed	Reality	October 6, 2022	1 season, 9 episodes	44–47 min	Australia	
The Ex-Wife	Psychological thriller	October 12, 2022	4 episodes	45 min	Australia, Austria, Germany, Switzerland and United Kingdom	
Hauntings	Paranormal docuseries	October 28, 2022	1 season, 4 episodes	45–46 min	United Kingdom	
Monster: The Loch Ness Mystery	Paranormal docuseries	November 17, 2022	3 episodes	52 min	United Kingdom	
The Flatshare	Comedy drama	December 1, 2022	1 season, 6 episodes	45 min	All markets except United States	
Blowing LA	Reality	December 8, 2022	1 season, 8 episodes	42–44 min	Canada and United Kingdom	
Last King of the Cross	Crime thriller	February 17, 2023	2 seasons, 20 episodes	44–62 min	Australia and Canada	
1939: Secrets of Hollywood's Golden Year	Docuseries	March 1, 2023	2 episodes	66 min	United Kingdom	
No Escape	Thriller	May 18, 2023	1 season, 7 episodes	52–60 min	Australia, Canada, Ireland and United Kingdom	
The Betoota Advocate Presents	Satirical comedy	June 14, 2023	4 episodes	44–48 min	Australia	
Hot Yachts	Reality	August 3, 2023	1 season, 6 episodes	42–48 min	United Kingdom	
One Night	Drama	September 1, 2023	6 episodes	52 min	Australia and United Kingdom	
The Killing Kind	Drama	September 7, 2023	6 episodes	45–49 min	United Kingdom	
Strip	Reality	October 1, 2023	1 season, 6 episodes	39–45 min	United Kingdom	
The Burning Girls	Horror thriller	October 19, 2023	1 season, 6 episodes	45–56 min	United Kingdom	
The Doll Factory	Historical thriller	November 27, 2023	6 episodes	46–51 min	United Kingdom	
Paper Dolls	Drama	December 3, 2023	8 episodes	40–43 min	Australia	
The Serial Killer's Wife	Crime drama	December 15, 2023	4 episodes	44–47 min	United Kingdom	
The Castaways	Thriller	December 26, 2023	1 season, 5 episodes	47–52 min	United Kingdom	
Motorway Cops USA	True crime docuseries	March 18, 2024	6 episodes	44–45 min	United Kingdom	
Celebrity Ex on the Beach (season 3) (Note: Previously aired on MTV UK)	Reality	March 19, 2024	1 season, 10 episodes	44 min	Australia and United Kingdom	
A Gentleman in Moscow	Historical thriller	March 29, 2024	8 episodes	43–55 min	All markets except United States and Latin America	
Top Gear Australia (season 5) (Note: Previously aired on SBS and Nine Network)	Reality	May 17, 2024	1 season, 8 episodes	58–64 min	All markets except Ireland, United Kingdom and United States	
Insomnia	Thriller	May 23, 2024	1 season, 6 episodes	45–47 min	Ireland and United Kingdom	
Fake	Thriller	July 4, 2024	8 episodes	40 min	Australia	
Stags	Crime drama	August 15, 2024	1 season, 6 episodes	TBA	Ireland and United Kingdom	
Curfew	Crime thriller	October 10, 2024	6 episodes	73–79 min	Ireland and United Kingdom	
Special Forces: Most Daring Missions	Military docuseries	November 24, 2024	3 episodes	44 min	Ireland and United Kingdom	
The Road Trip	Comedy drama	December 26, 2024	1 season, 6 episodes	45 min	Australia, Canada and United Kingdom	
The Inspired Unemployed: The List	Comedy travel series	May 1, 2025	6 episodes	41–48 min	Australia	
Playing Gracie Darling	Thriller	August 14, 2025; August 15, 2025; September 11, 2025 (Note: United Kingdom)	1 season, 6 episodes	42—43 min	Australia, Canada and United Kingdom	

==== Non-English language ====
===== French =====
Title	Genre	Premiere	Finale	Seasons	Runtime	Exclusive region(s)	Notes
Le Stade	Sports docuseries	December 22, 2022	September 4, 2023	2 seasons, 8 episodes	41–43 min	Selected territories	
The Signal – 149 KHZ	Horror thriller	July 1, 2025		1 season, 6 episodes	52 min	Canada	

===== German =====
Title	Genre	Premiere	Finale	Seasons	Runtime	Exclusive region(s)	Notes
Spotlight (season 6) (Note: Previously aired on Nickelodeon Germany)	Comedy drama	December 8, 2022		1 season, 13 episodes	23–25 min	Austria, Germany, Switzerland and United Kingdom	
The Sheikh	Comedy drama	December 22, 2022		1 season, 8 episodes	41–51 min	All markets except United States	
The Chemistry of Death	Psychological crime drama	January 12, 2023		1 season, 6 episodes	43–49 min	Selected territories	
A Thin Line	Drama thriller	February 16, 2023	March 16, 2023	1 season, 6 episodes	46–51 min	Austria, Germany and Switzerland	
Kohlrabenschwarz	Mystery drama	June 8, 2023		1 season, 6 episodes	44–50 min	Austria, Germany and Switzerland	
Drag Race Germany	Reality competition	September 5, 2023	November 21, 2023	1 season, 12 episodes	58–66 min	Austria, Germany and Switzerland	
One Trillion Dollars	Thriller	November 23, 2023		6 episodes	46–53 min	Selected territories	
Parallel Me	Fantasy comedy drama	April 26, 2025		8 episodes	41–48 min	Selected territories	

===== Italian =====
Title	Genre	Premiere	Finale	Seasons	Runtime	Exclusive region(s)	Notes
Ex on the Beach Italia (seasons 4–5) (Note: Previously aired on MTV Italy)	Reality	November 30, 2022	November 22, 2023	2 seasons, 20 episodes	40–50 min	Italy	
Are You the One? Italia	Dating show	February 15, 2023		1 season, 10 episodes	53–62 min	Italy	
Vita da Carlo (season 2) (Note: Previously released on Amazon Prime Video)	Comedy	September 15, 2023	September 29, 2023	1 season, 10 episodes	28–35 min	Italy	
Drag Race Italia (season 3) (Note: Previously released on Discovery+)	Reality competition	October 13, 2023	December 29, 2023	1 season, 12 episodes	51–75 min	Italy	

===== Portuguese =====
Title	Genre	Premiere	Finale	Seasons	Runtime	Exclusive region(s)	Notes
The Followers	Comedy thriller	March 6, 2022		1 season, 6 episodes	30–40 min	Latin America	
Adriano Imperador	Sports docuseries	July 21, 2022		3 episodes	41–45 min	Latin America	
Marcelo, Marmelo, Martelo	Comedy	July 8, 2023		1 season, 13 episodes	27–34 min	All markets except United States	
Drag Race Brasil	Reality competition	August 30, 2023	NOvember 15, 2023	1 season, 12 episodes	60–68 min	Brazil	(Note: Moved to WOW Presents Plus)

===== Spanish =====
Title	Genre	Premiere	Finale	Seasons	Runtime	Exclusive region(s)	Notes
Manos arriba, Chef!	Reality competition	July 29, 2021	October 15, 2022	3 seasons, 30 episodes	10–37 min	Latin America	
Siendo Pampita	Docu-reality	October 13, 2021	June 8, 2022	2 seasons, 19 episodes	24–29 min	Latin America	
Susana, Invitada de Honor	Talk show	November 30, 2021	March 27, 2026	1 season, 3 episodes	39–54 min	Latin America	
The Envoys	Horror thriller	December 12, 2021; January 20, 2022 (Note: Australia, Canada, Nordics and United States)	December 7, 2023	2 seasons, 16 episodes	43–63 min	Selected territories	
Cecilia	Family comedy drama	December 21, 2021; April 14, 2022	April 14, 2022	1 season, 8 episodes	30–44 min	Selected territories	
Marley & Mirko	Docu-reality	January 20, 2022		1 season, 8 episodes	24–31 min	Latin America	
The First of Us (Note: Episodes premiered on Paramount+ one week prior to being broadcast on Telefe.)	Telenovela	March 21, 2022	June 30, 2022	59 episodes	40–62 min	Latin America	
Bosé	Biopic	November 3, 2022 (Note: Australia, Latin America and Spain); December 1, 2022		1 season, 6 episodes	46–54 min	All markets	
Drag Race México	Reality competition	June 22, 2023	September 7, 2023	1 season, 12 episodes	57–62 min	Latin America	

==== Co-productions ====
Title	Genre	Partner/Country	Premiere	Finale	Seasons	Runtime	Language	Exclusive region(s)	Notes
Circeo	True crime drama	RAI/Italy	September 15, 2022		6 episodes	52–56 min	Italian	Austria, France, Germany, Italy and Switzerland	
Pervert: Hunting the Strip Search Caller	True crime docuseries	Netflix/United States	October 25, 2022		3 episodes	60 min	English	Ireland and United Kingdom	
Corpo Libero	Teen thriller drama	RAI/Italy; ZDFneo/Germany	October 26, 2022		1 season, 6 episodes	49–53 min	Italian	Selected territories	
Con Girl	True crime docuseries	Seven Network/Australia	February 22, 2023		4 episodes	46–51 min	English	Ireland and United Kingdom	
North Shore	Crime thriller	Network 10/Australia	May 10, 2023	June 14, 2023	1 season, 6 episodes	44 min	English	Australia	
Colin from Accounts	Comedy	Binge/Australia	November 9, 2023	September 10, 2026	3 seasons, 24 episodes	21–35 min	English	United States	
Treasure Island	Historical adventure	MGM+/United States	October 12, 2026	November 16, 2026	6 episodes	44–49 min	English	Ireland and United Kingdom	

==== Specials ====
===== Stand-up comedy =====
Title	Premiere	Runtime	Language	Exclusive region(s)
Peter Helliar: Loopy	April 1, 2022	58 min	English	Australia
Geraldine Hickey: What a Surprise	April 1, 2022	54 min	English	Australia
Nath Valvo: I'm Happy for You	April 1, 2022	52 min	English	Australia
Tom Ballard: Enough	April 1, 2022	1 h	English	Australia
Guy Montgomery by Name, Guy Montgomery by Nature	November 11, 2022	1 h 5 min	English	Australia
Michelle Brasier: Average Bear	November 11, 2022	1 h 1 min	English	Australia
Sammy J: Symphony in J Minor	November 11, 2022	55 min	English	Australia
Luke Heggie: I Already Told You	November 11, 2022	54 min	English	Australia
Kirsty Webeck: Silver Linings	November 11, 2022	1 h 2 min	English	Australia
Dane Simpson: Didgeridoozy	November 11, 2022	56 min	English	Australia
Ivan Aristeguieta: Happy Papi	November 11, 2022	1 h	English	Australia
Harley Breen: Flat Out	November 11, 2022	1 h 5 min	English	Australia

== See also ==
- List of TVING original programming
