= Ex on the Beach Italia season 5 =

Ex on the Beach Italia
- Season 5
- No. of episodes: 10

Release
- Original network: Paramount+ MTV Italy
- Original release: 22 November 2023 – 17 January 2024

Season chronology
- ← Previous; Season 4

The fifth season of Ex on the Beach Italia, an Italian television show, began airing on 22 November 2023 on Paramount+, and 26 November 2023 on MTV Italy. It was filmed for the third time on an island in Cartagena, Colombia.

== Cast ==
Main cast member Matteo Cavalieri previously appeared in the fourth season. Josè resides in Aosta, but is originally from Santo Domingo, Dominican Republic. Donato and Giulia previously appeared in the third season.

- **Bold** indicates original cast member; all other cast were brought into the series as an ex.

Episodes	Cast member	Age	Hometown	Exes
6	**Denis Adrija**	22	Rome	Marco Baiata
10	**Elisabeth Shostak**	26	Ferrara	Samuele Durosini
10	**Giulio Pastorelli**	28	Orbetello	Clarissa Festa
4	**Jasmine Pili**	26	Rome	Daniele Paglia
5	**José Feliz**	28	Aosta	Giulia Dell'Aiera
8	**Karin Conti**	27	Varese	Federico Tassi
10	**Laura di Lullo**	26	Naples	Samuele Durosini, Diego Graziani
10	**Matteo Cavalieri**	23	Bologna	Laura Libbi
10	Marco Baiata	29	Milan	Denis Adrija, Daniele Serra
9	Laura Libbi	18	Camponogara	Matteo Cavalieri, Alberto Torres Magro
9	Samuele Durosini	24		Elisabeth Shostak, Laura di Lullo
8	Daniele Paglia	25	Pomezia	Jasmine Pili
5	Giulia Dell'Aiera	27	Turin	José Feliz, Donato Russillo
7	Clarissa Festa	27	Modena	Giulio Pastorelli, Federico Tassi
7	Daniele Serra	23	Milan	Marco Baiata
3	Donato Russillo	29	Rome	Giulia Dell'Aiera
4	Federico "Freddie" Tassi		Milan	Karin Conti, Clarissa Festa
4	Alberto Torres Magro	25	Caldogno	Laura Libbi, Elsa Ochea
3	Elsa Ochea	23	Verona	Alberto Torres Magro
2	Diego Graziani		Rome	Laura di Lullo

=== Duration of cast ===
Cast members	Episodes									
Cast members	1	2	3	4	5	6	7	8	9	10
Denis										
Elisabeth										
Giulio										
Jasmine										
José										
Karin										
Laura										
Matteo										
Marco										
Laura L										
Samuel										
Daniele										
Giulia										
Clarissa										
Daniele S										
Donato										
Freddie										
Alberto										
Elsa										
Diego										

Table Key
Key: = "Cast member" is featured in this episode
Key: = "Cast member" arrives on the beach
Key: = "Cast member" arrives on the beach and has an ex arrive during the same episode
Key: = "Cast member" has an ex arrive on the beach
Key: = "Cast member" leaves the beach
Key: = "Cast member" does not feature in this episode

== Episodes ==
No. overall	No. in season	Title	Paramount+ release date	MTV release date
41	1	"Ritorno a Tierra Bomba"	22 November 2023	26 November 2023
42	2	"Il party del terrore"	22 November 2023	26 December 2023
43	3	"Nuovi ex e nuove reine"	29 November 2023	3 December 2023
44	4	"Primi addii e primi amori"	6 December 2023	10 December 2023
45	5	"Vecchie conoscenze e nuovi intrighi"	13 December 2023	17 December 2023
46	6	"Amore e altre disintegrazioni"	20 December 2023	24 December 2023
47	7	"Segnali dal futuro"	27 December 2023	7 January 2024
48	8	"Nuovi arrivi e colpi di scena"	3 January 2024	14 January 2024
49	9	"Acque pericolose"	10 January 2024	21 January 2024
50	10	"Arrivederci Colombia"	17 January 2024	28 January 2024
