= Ex on the Beach Italia season 1 =

Ex on the Beach Italia
- Season 1
- No. of episodes: 10

Release
- Original network: MTV Italy
- Original release: 23 September – 21 November 2018

Season chronology
- Next → Season 2

The first season of Ex on the Beach Italia, an Italian television programme, began airing on 26 September 2018 on MTV Italy. The show was announced on 16 July 2018, and premiered on MTV Italy on 26 September of the same year. The official list of cast members, confirmed with a picture posted on social media, includes four single boys and four single girls. Elettra Lamborghini was introduced as hostess. The filming location was held on the coast of Thailand, in Pattaya.

== Cast ==
- **Bold** indicates original cast member; all other cast were brought into the series as an ex.

Episodes	Cast member	Age	Hometown	Exes
9	**Andrea Zolli**	29	Varese	Tecla De Santis
8	**Federica Pacela**	31	Biella	Yuri Rambaldi
9	**Gianluca Giargiulo**	27	Gabbro	Alssia
9	**Gianmarco Capironi**	29	Milan	Naomi De Crescenzo, Jessica Salazar
9	**Jessica Ferrara**	27	Naples	Renato Biancardi
4	**Michele De Falco**	23	Naples	—N/a
9	**Vanessa Sedita**	21	Milan	Luciana Capolongo, Deliel Moiana
9	Tecla De Santis		Rome	Andrea Zolli
7	Yuri Rambaldi	25	Pavia	Federica Pacela, Raffaella Cafagna
7	Naomi De Crescenzo	22	Milan	Gianmarco Capironi
6	Renato Biancardi	25	Naples	Jessica Ferrara
3	Jessica Salazar		Medellín	Gianmarco Capironi
4	Luciana Capolongo		Milan	Vanessa Sedita
2	Raffaella Cafagna	24		Yuri Rambaldi
3	Deliel Moiana		Milan	Vanessa Sedita
2	Alessia Arati	40	Rome	Gianluca Gargiulo

=== Duration of cast ===
Cast members	Episodes								
Cast members	1	2	3	4	5	6	7	8	9
Andrea									
Federica									
Gianluca									
Gianmarco									
Jessica F									
Michele									
Vanessa									
Tecla									
Yuri									
Naomi									
Renato									
Jessica S									
Luciana									
Raffaella									
Deliel									
Alessia									

Table Key
Key: = "Cast member" is featured in this episode
Key: = "Cast member" arrives on the beach
Key: = "Cast member" has an ex arrive on the beach
Key: = "Cast member" arrives on the beach and has an ex arrive during the same episode
Key: = "Cast member" leaves the beach
Key: = "Cast member" does not feature in this episode

== Episodes ==
No. overall	No. in season	Title	Original release date
1	1	"Episode 1"	26 September 2018
2	2	"Episode 2"	26 September 2018
3	3	"Episode 3"	3 October 2018
4	4	"Episode 4"	10 October 2018
5	5	"Episode 5"	17 October 2018
6	6	"Episode 6"	24 October 2018
7	7	"Episode 7"	31 October 2018
8	8	"Episode 8"	7 November 2018
9	9	"Episode 9"	14 November 2018
10	10	"Episode 10"	21 November 2018
