= Ex on the Beach Italia season 4 =

Ex on the Beach Italia
- Season 4
- No. of episodes: 10

Release
- Original network: MTV Italy; Paramount+
- Original release: 30 November – 28 December 2022

Season chronology
- ← Previous; Season 3 Next → Season 5

The fourth season of Ex on the Beach Italia, an Italian television programme, began airing on 30 November 2022, on MTV Italy and for the first time on Paramount+, after Paramount Global announced in September 2022 the acquisition of the rights to the series. It was filmed for the second time on an island in Cartagena, Colombia.

In March 2024, Jasmin Salvati joined the cast of the first season of Italia Shore. In May 2025, she competed in the nineteenth season of L'isola dei famosi.

== Cast ==
- **Bold** indicates original cast member; all other cast were brought into the series as an ex.

Episodes	Cast member	Age	Hometown	Exes
10	**Alessandra Destefanis**	24	Turin	Alessia Andreano
10	**Antonio "Pistacchione" Latella**	32	Rome	Jasmin Salvati
7	**Camilla Natali**	25	Florence	Lorenzo Bonanni
4	**Danilo Scorca**	29	Bari	—N/a
10	**Eleonora Garrioli**	24	Rome	Gianmarco Pietrantoni
10	**Manuel Rossato**	24	Verona	Martina Aquilio
10	**Matteo Cavalieri**	26	Bologna	Naike Zilla
10	**Valentina Della Valle**	22	Milan	Andrea Bardaro, Paola Morandi
9	Gianmarco Pietrantoni	25	Rome	Chiara Gioco, Eleonora Garrioli
8	Jasmin Salvati	22	Rome	Antonio Latella, Simone Simoni
8	Andrea Bardaro	25	Naples	Valentina Della Valle, Vanessa Chindamo
2	Chiara Gioco	26	Rome	Gianmarco Pietrantoni
7	Vanessa Chindamo	29	Milan	Andrea Bardaro
2	Lorenzo Bonanni	32	Florence	Camilla Natali
3	Martina Aquilio	26	Pescara	Manuel Rossato
5	Simone Simoni	20	Rome	Jasmin Salvati
4	Alessia Andreano	25	Milan	Alessandra Destefanis
4	Paola Morandi	24	Cremona	Valentina Della Valle
3	Naike Zilla	20	Milan	Matteo Cavalieri, Paolo Campidelli
2	Paolo Campidelli	27	Rimini	Naike Zilla

=== Duration of cast ===
Cast members	Episodes									
Cast members	1	2	3	4	5	6	7	8	9	10
Alessandra										
Pistacchione										
Camilla										
Danilo										
Eleonora										
Manuel										
Matteo										
Valentina										
Gianmarco										
Jasmine										
Andrea										
Chiara										
Vamnessa										
Lorenzo										
Martina										
Simone										
Alessia										
Naike										
Paola										
Paolo										

Table Key
Key: = "Cast member" is featured in this episode
Key: = "Cast member" arrives on the beach
Key: = "Cast member" has an ex arrive on the beach
Key: = "Cast member" leaves the beach
Key: = "Cast member" does not feature in this episode

== Episodes ==
No. overall	No. in season	Title	Original release date
31	1	"Episode 1"	30 November 2022
32	2	"Episode 2"	30 November 2022
33	3	"Episode 3"	7 December 2022
34	4	"Episode 4"	7 December 2022
35	5	"Episode 5"	14 December 2022
36	6	"Episode 6"	14 December 2022
37	7	"Episode 7"	21 December 2022
38	8	"Episode 8"	21 December 2022
39	9	"Episode 9"	28 December 2022
40	10	"Episode 10"	28 December 2022
