= Ex on the Beach Italia season 2 =

Ex on the Beach Italia
- Season 2
- No. of episodes: 10

Release
- Original network: MTV Italy
- Original release: 22 January – 18 March 2020

Season chronology
- ← Previous; Season 1 Next → Season 3

The second season of Ex on the Beach Italia, an Italian television programme, began airing on 22 January 2020 on MTV Italy. The official list of cast members was confirmed with an image spread on networks, it includes three single boys and four single girls.

== Cast ==
- **Bold** indicates original cast member; all other cast were brought into the series as an ex.

| Episodes | Cast member | Age | Hometown | Exes |
|---|---|---|---|---|
| 9 | **Daniele Tosto** | 22 | Milan | Greta De Santi |
| 9 | **Denise Rossi** | 22 | Grosseto | Simone Amato |
| 9 | **Fabiana Barra** | 21 | Vicenza | Matteo Marconato |
| 9 | **Klea Marku** | 24 | Rome | Alessio Mattioni |
| 6 | **Lucrezia Borlini** | 23 | Milan | Mattia Garufi |
| 9 | **Matteo Diamante** | 30 | Genoa | Nikita Pelizon |
| 9 | **Sasha Donatelli** | 27 | Casalincontrada | Fanny Armi, Wendy Lorena |
| 4 | Alessio Mattioni | 29 | | Klea Marku, Violetta Gamberini |
| 6 | Simone Amato | 30 | | Denise Rossi, Melissa |
| 4 | Fanny Armi | 29 | | Sasha Donatelli |
| 7 | Greta De Santi | 19 | | Daniele Tosto |
| 3 (Note: In episode 5, Violetta was kicked out of the house after a physical altercation with Greta.) | Violetta Gamberini | 24 | Bologna | Alessio Mattioni, Andrea Sirotti |
| 6 | Mattia Garufi | | Milan | Lucrezia Borlini |
| 3 | Melissa Rizzetto | | Treviso | Simone Amato |
| 5 | Andrea Sirotti | | Modena | Violetta Gamberini |
| 4 | Nikita Pelizon | | Trieste | Matteo Diamante |
| 2 | Wendy Lorena | | | Sasha Donatelli |
| 4 | Matteo Marconato | | | Fabiana Barra |

=== Duration of cast ===
| Cast members | Episodes | | | | | | | | |
| Cast members | 1 | 2 | 3 | 4 | 5 | 6 | 7 | 8 | 9 |
|---|---|---|---|---|---|---|---|---|---|
| Daniele | | | | | | | | | |
| Denise | | | | | | | | | |
| Fabiana | | | | | | | | | |
| Klea | | | | | | | | | |
| Lucrezia | | | | | | | | | |
| Matteo D | | | | | | | | | |
| Sasha | | | | | | | | | |
| Alessio | | | | | | | | | |
| Simone | | | | | | | | | |
| Fanny | | | | | | | | | |
| Greta | | | | | | | | | |
| Violetta | | | | | | | | | |
| Mattia | | | | | | | | | |
| Melissa | | | | | | | | | |
| Andrea | | | | | | | | | |
| Nikita | | | | | | | | | |
| Wendy | | | | | | | | | |
| Matteo M | | | | | | | | | |

Table Key
Key: = "Cast member" is featured in this episode
Key: = "Cast member" arrives on the beach
Key: = "Cast member" has an ex arrive on the beach
Key: = "Cast member" arrives on the beach and has an ex arrive during the same episode
Key: = "Cast member" leaves the beach
Key: = "Cast member" has an ex arrive on the beach and leaves during the same episode
Key: = "Cast member" does not feature in this episode

=== After filming ===
Sasha Donatelli then returned in the third season in the role of ex.

== Episodes ==
| No. overall | No. in season | Title | Original release date |
|---|---|---|---|
| 11 | 1 | "Episode 1" | 22 January 2020 |
| 12 | 2 | "Episode 2" | 29 January 2020 |
| 13 | 3 | "Episode 3" | 5 February 2020 |
| 14 | 4 | "Episode 4" | 12 February 2020 |
| 15 | 5 | "Episode 5" | 19 February 2020 |
| 16 | 6 | "Episode 6" | 26 February 2020 |
| 17 | 7 | "Episode 7" | 4 March 2020 |
| 18 | 8 | "Episode 8" | 11 March 2020 |
| 19 | 9 | "Episode 9" | 18 March 2020 |
| 20 | 10 | "Episode 10" | 25 March 2020 |
