= Ex on the Beach Italia season 3 =

Ex on the Beach Italia
- Season 3
- No. of episodes: 10

Release
- Original network: MTV Italy
- Original release: 13 October – 15 December 2021

Season chronology
- ← Previous; Season 2 Next → Season 4

The third season of Ex on the Beach Italia, an Italian television programme, began airing on 13 October 2021 on MTV Italy. It was announced in June 2021 and premiered on 13 October of that same year.

A series of four special episodes that premiered between 15 and 22 September under the name "Ex On The Beach Italia – What Happened Next" was also confirmed, in which everything that happened to them is revealed. to the cast members of the first and second seasons once they returned to everyday life, while on 29 September and 2 October the last two episodes entitled "Ex On The Beach Italia – Casting" were released where it was shown the casting and all cast members.

== Cast ==
- **Bold** indicates original cast member; all other cast were brought into the series as an ex.

Episodes	Cast member	Age	Hometown	Exes
8	**Cecilia Palloni**	22	Bergamo	Stefano Spelta
10	**Donato Russillo**	27	Rome	Sara La Pietra
10	**Federica Tirassa**		Ivrea	Carmine Pellino
10	**Federico Alpone**	22	Turin	Giulia Dell'Aiera, Sara La Pietra
6	**Giampaolo Calvaresi**	29	Milan	Gabriella Alluigi
7	**Khady Guey**	24	Milan	Dario Fabris
10	**Luana Cerbino**	27	Rome	Sasha Donatelli
10	**Manuel Dosio**	23	Forlì	Susan Larcher
4	**Syria Zito**	21	Ladispoli	Giordano Perotti
4	Stefano Spelta		Milan	Cecilia Palloni
5	Gabriella Alluigi			Giampaolo Calvaresi
8	Giordano Perotti	22	Rome	Ludovica Petrella, Syria Zito
7	Sasha Donatelli	29	Chieti	Luana Cerbino
6	Sara La Pietra	24	Turin	Donato Russillo, Federico Alpone
1	Dario Fabris	30	Milan	Khady Gueye
5	Giulia Dell'Aiera	25	Turin	Federico Alpone
4	Ludovica Petrella	23	Rome	Giordano Perotti
3	Susan Larcher	22		Andrea Coletti, Manuel Dosio
2	Carmine Pellino	33	Milan	Federica Tirassa
1	Andrea Coletti		Milan	Susan Larcher

=== Duration of cast ===
Cast members	Episodes									
Cast members	1	2	3	4	5	6	7	8	9	10
Cecilia										
Donato										
Federica										
Federico										
Giampaolo										
Khady										
Luana										
Manuel										
Syria										
Stefano										
Gabriella										
Giordano										
Sasha										
Sara										
Dario										
Giulia										
Ludovica										
Susan										
Carmine										
Andrea										

Table Key
Key: = "Cast member" is featured in this episode
Key: = "Cast member" arrives on the beach
Key: = "Cast member" has an ex arrive on the beach
Key: = "Cast member" arrives on the beach and has an ex arrive during the same episode
Key: = "Cast member" leaves the beach
Key: = "Cast member" arrives on the beach and leaves during the same episode
Key: = "Cast member" does not feature in this episode

== Episodes ==
No. overall	No. in season	Title	Original release date
21	1	"Episode 1"	13 October 2021
22	2	"Episode 2"	20 October 2021
23	3	"Episode 3"	27 October 2021
24	4	"Episode 4"	3 November 2021
25	5	"Episode 5"	10 November 2021
26	6	"Episode 6"	17 November 2021
27	7	"Episode 7"	24 November 2021
28	8	"Episode 8"	1 December 2021
29	9	"Episode 9"	8 December 2021
30	10	"Episode 10"	15 December 2021
