= De La Calle =

2023 American documentary TV series

- Genre: Documentary
- Created by: Nick Barili
- Presented by: Nick Barili
- Country of origin: United States
- Original languages: English, Spanish
- No. of seasons: 1
- No. of episodes: 8

Production
- Executive producer: Nick Barili
- Camera setup: Multi-camera
- Running time: 44–62 minutes
- Production companies: Hard Knock Television; MTV Entertainment Studios; Zero Point Zero Productions

Original release
- Network: Paramount+
- Release: November 7, 2023

De La Calle (English: From the Streets) is a documentary television series created, hosted, and executive produced by Argentine-American journalist Nick Barili. The series delves into the evolution of urbano music and its cultural origins across the Americas and Spain. It premiered on Paramount+ on November 7, 2023.

== Premise ==
The series explores the socio-cultural history of urbano music genres, including hip hop, reggaeton, Latin trap, cumbia, flamenco, and others. By featuring pioneers and key contributors to these genres, De La Calle highlights the creativity, resilience, and cultural richness of marginalized communities.

Through exclusive interviews with artists such as Fat Joe, N.O.R.E., Residente, Mala Rodriguez, Nicky Jam, Nicki Nicole, Villano Antillano, Sech, Nathy Peluso, Jessie Reyez, Feid and Gente de Zona, the series provides an in-depth look at the roots and modern expressions of urbano music. De La Calle takes viewers through cities and regions influential in the genre's development.

== Episodes ==
The following episodes comprise season 1 of De La Calle, each focusing on a specific region or theme to highlight unique musical and cultural narratives

1. New York: Explores the birthplace of hip hop and examines the role of Latinos as co-founders of the genre.
2. Panama: Investigates the origins of reggae en español, a direct ancestor to reggaeton, and includes a spotlight on international superstar Sech.
3. Puerto Rico: Examines reggaeton's evolution from an underground, criminalized movement to a mainstream global phenomenon.
4. Cuba: Chronicles the development of rap Cubano on an island isolated from global influences, where hip-hop was once viewed as a cultural invasion.
5. Spain: Highlights Spain's hip hop scene post-fascism and its fusion with flamenco and other traditional music styles.
6. Colombia: Covers Medellín's emergence as a Reggaetón hub and Cartagena's Afro-Colombian champeta music.
7. Argentina: Explores Argentina's independent urbano music scene, driven by rap battles and genre fusions.
8. Mexico: Investigates how youth culture in Mexico blends traditional music with rap and reggaeton.

== Production ==
Nick Barili developed the series over 15 years through his production company, Hard Knock TV. The project was greenlit by MTV Entertainment Studios and produced in collaboration with ZPZ Productions.

Barili wanted to explore the Latin and Hispanic cultures through the lens of music while showing the stories behind the musicians and the things that inspired them.

== Release and reception ==
De La Calle premiered at the Los Angeles Latino International Film Festival (LALIFF) and the Tribeca Film Festival in June 2023. The series received widespread praise for its storytelling, cultural exploration, and unique focus on the interconnectedness of Latino and Black musical traditions.

Hola Magazine stated: "As the music industry's next big hit, De La Calle offers a fascinating and in-depth exploration of urbano music and its profound cultural roots."

== Awards ==
De La Calle and Nick Barili won the 2024 Imagen Award for Best Variety or Reality Show. The series was also nominated for a 2025 Cinema Eye Honors Award for Outstanding Anthology Series.
