= Italia Shore =

Italy reality television series

- Genre: Reality
- Created by: MTV
- Music by: Piotta
- Opening theme: "Supercafone"
- Country of origin: Italy
- Original language: Italian
- No. of seasons: 3
- No. of episodes: 30

Production
- Production companies: MTV Entertainment Studios; Paramount Television Studios

Original release
- Network: MTV; Paramount+
- Release: 4 March 2024 – present

Related
- Shore franchise Ex on the Beach Italia

Italia Shore is an Italian reality television series that aired on MTV Italia and Paramount+. It premiered on 4 March 2024. It is the Italian version of the American television franchise Jersey Shore. The show follows the daily lives of ten housemates who live together for several weeks in Fregene, Lazio.

== Production ==
In February 2022, Paramount Global announced a new line of unscripted series and renewals for MTV Entertainment Studios that included seven new versions of the Shore franchise.

In September 2023, the Paramount Plus service was launched for the first time in Italy. At the same time, the programming and production of Italian series was carried out, including Italia Shore, which was announced for the first time on 15 September of that year.

== Seasons ==
=== Season 1 ===
The first season premiered on 4 March 2024 on Paramount+ and on 10 March on MTV. On 12 February 2024, MTV revealed the list of cast members, which showed the twelve participants of the first season, including those who came as replacements for Axel Essan, who left voluntarily, and Jasmin Salvati (previously part of the fourth season of Ex on the Beach Italia), who was fired by the production.

A special episode titled "Meet The Cast" aired a month before the show's official launch on 12 February 2024.

=== Season 2 ===
The second season premiered on 18 February 2025. In June 2024, Paramount Global renewed the show for a second season, which was filmed in Rome between August and September of that year. The cast was revealed along with the premiere date. On 7 February 2025, the second "Meet the Cast" was released, which included five newcomers: Beatrice Cirioni, Gaia, Nicole Bertoni, Alessandro Ronca, and Vincenzo D'Antò.

=== Season 3 ===
The third season premiered on February 3, 2026 on Paramount+. The cast was announced a month before the premiere; only four members returned from the previous season, including original cast members Piermarco Vellitri and Samuele Bragelli. New cast members include Eduardo Ciletti, Eleonora Terzulli, Marta Di Ventura, Stefano Modica, and sisters Greta and Sara Amenta. Filming for the season took place between August and September 2025. Alessandro Cappelletti joined the show from the fifth episode onwards, while Catia Sinigaglia, of Italian descent and originally from Melbourne, who is a cast member of Aussie Shore, the Australian version of the show, made a special appearance in the sixth episode and was confirmed as an official cast member in the following episode.

== Cast ==
=== Current cast ===
Cast member	Age	Hometown	Description	Season
Piermarco "Marcolino" Vellitri	22	Anzio	"E io so' un bel mammone" (1) "I pali li prendo solo a calcio" (2)	1–
Alessandro "Ale" Ronca	23	Rome	"Sono un cazzone intelligente" (2)	2–
Nicole "Nikita" Bertoni	23	Milan	"La classe non è acqua" (2)	2–
Alessandro "Cappe" Cappelletti	21	Milan	TBA	3–
Eduardo Ciletti	22	Naples	TBA	3–
Eleonora Terzulli	18	Turin	TBA	3–
Greta Amenta	23	Florence	TBA	3–
Marta Di Ventura	24	Zagarolo	TBA	3–
Sara Amenta	19	Florence	TBA	3–
Stefano Modica	21	Lentini	TBA	3–

=== Former cast ===
Cast member	Age	Hometown	Description	Season
Samuele "Spadino" Bragelli	24	Rome	"Dico cazzate, ma mica è 'n difetto" (1) "Nun so' ricco, ma so' Rocco" (2)	1–3
Emi Zhou Viola Zijun	23	Riccione	"Ubriaca tutti i giorni" (1) "Rossa di capelli, golosa di passatelli" (2)	1–2
Francesco "Skino" Russo	20	Colleferro	"So' coatto sì, ma de 'na certa classe" (1) "Flexo, ma non mi spezzo" (2)	1–2
Gilda "La Giss" Provenzano	22	Cosenza	"Sono más picante" (1) "Profumo di trash e puzzo di Giss" (2)	1–2
Swamy Prinno	21	Volla	"No Swamy, no party" (1) "L'inciucessa è tornata" (2)	1–2
Mattia "Drago" Caruso	20	Rigutino	"Profumo di cash e puzzo di street" (1) "Il king mette sempre tutti al tappeto; bam!" (2)	1–2
Asia Calamassi	23	Florence	"Mi devono stare tutti lontano"	1
Gianmarco Lugato	24	Venice	"Io quando esco, esco per far foco"	1
Claris Oliveros De Piccoli (Note: Claris Oliveros left the house before the season finale, after which she did not return to the show.)	21	Santa Severa	"Occhio, che se m'incazzo mozzico"	1
Jasmin Melika Salvati	23	Ladispoli	"Con me non si sta mai tranquilli, c'ho sempre l'ultima parola"	1
Axel Essan	23	Monza	"Sono una drama queen"	1
Beatrice "Bea" Cirioni (Note: Beatrice Cirioni joined the show as a special guest, however, starting with the sixth episode she was credited as a main cast member.)	26	Rome	"It's Bea time"	2
Gaia	20	Rome	"Quando finisce la festa lo decido io"	2
Vincenzo D'Antò	23	Naples	"Song napulitanö, capiscï a me"	2
Catia Sinigaglia (Note: Catia joined the show as a special guest; however, from the seventh episode onwards, she appeared as a member of the main cast.)	26	Melbourne	TBA	3

==== Duration of cast ====
Current cast members
Cast member	Series 1										Series 2										Series 3									
Cast member	1	2	3	4	5	6	7	8	9	10	1	2	3	4	5	6	7	8	9	10	1	2	3	4	5	6	7	8	9	10
Marcolino																														
Nikita																														
Ale																														
Eduardo																														
Greta																														
Marta																														
Sara																														
Stefano																														
Eleonora																														
Cappe																														
Former cast members
Spadino																														
La Giss																														
Emi																														
Drago																														
Asia																														
Jasmin																														
Axel																														
Skino																														
Claris																														
Gianmarco																														
Swamy																														
Gaia																														
Vincenzo																														
Bea																														
Catia																														

- = Cast member is featured in this episode
- = Cast member arrives in the house
- = Cast member voluntarily leaves the house
- = Cast member is removed from the house
- = Cast member leaves and returns to the house in the same episode
- = Cast member returns to the house
- = Cast member features in this episode, but outside of the house
- = Cast member does not feature in this episode
- = Cast member voluntarily leaves the series
- = Cast member returns to the series
- = Cast member is removed from the series
- = Cast member features in this episode despite not being an official cast member at the time
- = Cast member is not officially a cast member in this episode

== Episodes ==
Series	Episodes	Originally released	
Series	Episodes	First released	Last released
1	10	4 March 2024	29 April 2024
2	10	18 February 2025	22 April 2025
3	10	3 February 2026	7 April 2026

=== Season 1 (2024) ===
No. overall	No. in season	Title	Original release date	MTV release date
–	–	"Meet the cast"	12 February 2024	N/A
1	1	"Vacanza Mode on!" "Vacation Mode on!"	4 March 2024	10 March 2024
2	2	"Lavoro, liti e lussuria" "Work, arguments and lust"	4 March 2024	17 March 2024
3	3	"Because the Night"	11 March 2024	24 March 2024
4	4	"La danza del corteggiamento" "The courtship dance"	18 March 2024	31 March 2024
5	5	"Il triangolo della gelosia" "The triangle of jealousy"	25 March 2024	7 April 2024
6	6	"Calma e sangue freddo: livello zero" "Calm and cool: level zero"	1 April 2024	14 April 2024
7	7	"Un ingresso vulcanico" "A volcanic entrance"	8 April 2024	21 April 2024
8	8	"Tentazioni pericolose" "Dangerous temptations"	15 April 2024	28 April 2024
9	9	"Strip & Revenge: Intrighi e Vendetta" "Strip & Revenge: Intrigues and Vendetta"	22 April 2024	5 May 2024
10	10	"We are family!!!"	29 April 2024	12 May 2024

=== Season 2 (2025) ===
No. overall	No. in season	Title	Original release date	MTV release date
–	–	"Meet the cast"	7 February 2025	N/A
11	1	"Back to Shore"	18 February 2025	7 December 2025
12	2	"Nuovi arrivi, vecchie abitudini" "New arrivals, old habits"	25 February 2025	14 December 2025
13	3	"Gli Shore Boy" "The Shore Boys"	4 March 2025	21 December 2025
14	4	"La Vie En Shore" "The Life In Shore"	11 March 2025	28 December 2025
15	5	"Amore e Psycho" "Love and Psycho"	18 March 2025	4 January 2026
16	6	"We Are Shore Family"	25 March 2025	11 January 2026
17	7	"O Shore Mio" "My Shore"	1 April 2025	18 January 2026
18	8	"Castelli, draghi e altre storie" "Castles, dragons and other stories"	8 April 2025	25 January 2026
19	9	"Incoscienti Giovani" "Reckless Younglings"	15 April 2025	1 February 2026
20	10	"NEVERENDING SHORE"	22 April 2025	1 February 2026

=== Season 3 (2026) ===
No. overall	No. in season	Title	Original release date	
–	–	"Meet the cast"	20 January 2026	N/A
21	1	"Stessa Spiaggia, Stesso Mare" "Same sea, same shore"	3 February 2026	N/A
22	2	"Good Vibes"	10 February 2026	N/A
23	3	"Cascate di follia" "Falls of Madness"	17 February 2026	N/A
24	4	"Che Circo!" "What a circus!"	24 February 2026	N/A
25	5	"Un Posto al Shore" "A place on the coast"	3 March 2026	N/A
26	6	"Dall’Australia con rumore" "From Australia with noise"	10 March 2026	N/A
27	7	"Capri, Sorrento e tutto cambia in un momento" "Capri, Sorrento and everything changes in an instant"	17 March 2026	N/A
28	8	"La regina è tornata" "The Queen is back"	24 March 2026	N/A
29	9	"Ho visto lei che bacia lui" "I saw her kissing him"	31 March 2026	N/A
30	10	"The Shore Must Go On"	7 April 2026	N/A
