= Ex on the Beach Italia =

- Genre: Reality; Dating show
- Based on: Ex on the Beach
- Presented by: Elettra Lamborghini (1); Cecilia Rodriguez (2–4); Ignazio Moser (2–4); Giulia Salemi (5); Pierpaolo Pretelli (5)
- Country of origin: Italy
- Original language: Italian
- No. of series: 5
- No. of episodes: 50

Production
- Running time: 45 minutes (1, 4–5); 30 minutes (2–3) (Not including commercialss)
- Production company: Paramount Global

Original release
- Network: MTV Italy; Now; Sky Italia; Paramount+ (4–)
- Release: 26 September 2018 – 17 January 2024

Related
- Italia Shore

Ex on the Beach Italia is an Italian reality television series that airs on MTV, Sky Italia, and Now TV. The series premiered on 25 September 2018. It features single men and women on a summer vacation, with their exes joining the cast.

In September 2022, Paramount Global announced that it had acquired the production rights to the show.

== Season overview ==
Series	Location	Episodes	Originally released	
Series	Location	Episodes	First released	Last released
1	Pattaya, Thailand	10	26 September 2018	21 November 2018
2	Pattaya, Thailand	10	22 January 2020	18 March 2020
3	Pattaya, Thailand	10	13 October 2021	15 December 2021
4	Isla Barú, Colombia	10	30 November 2022	28 December 2022
5	Isla Barú, Colombia	10	22 November 2023	17 January 2024

=== Season 1 (2018) ===
The first season of the show was announced on 16 July 2018, and premiered on MTV Italy on 26 September of the same year. The official list of cast members, confirmed with a picture posted on social media, included four single boys and four single girls.

=== Season 2 (2020) ===
The second season of the show premiered on MTV Italy on 22 January 2020. The official list of cast members was confirmed with an image spread on networks, it included three single boys and four single girls.

=== Season 3 (2021) ===
The third season was announced in June 2021 and premiered on 13 October 2021.

=== Season 4 (2022) ===
On 16 November 2022, MTV announced the fourth season, and premiere on 30 November of that same year. It was filmed for the second time on an island in Cartagena, Colombia.

=== Season 5 (2023–24) ===
The fifth season premiered on 22 November 2023. It was again filmed on Cartagena Island, Colombia. Giulia Salemi and Pierpaolo Pretelli were the new presenters of the program. The list of cast members was announced on 3 November 2023.
